= Eritreans in Germany =

Eritrean diaspora in Germany

- Eritrean population in Germany by state.

Total population
- 75,735

Regions with significant populations
- Frankfurt · Kassel · Hamburg · Duisburg

Languages
- Tigrinya · Tigre · Kunama · Nara · Afar, · Beja · Saho · Bilen · Arabic · English · German

Religion
- Christian (Eritrean Orthodox, Catholic, P'ent'ay) · Islam

Eritreans in Germany are citizens and residents of Germany who were born in Eritrea or are of Eritrean descent. As of 2020, there are at least 75,735 Eritreans living in Germany.

== History ==
Interaction between Germany and the Horn of Africa dates back to at least the early 15th century; three Ethiopian monks, Petrus, Bartholomeus, and Antonius, are recorded as having been in Konstanz from 1416–1418, and participated in the Council of Constance. In the Late Middle Ages, the Kingdom of Ethiopia also controlled much of present-day Eritrea. Thus, it is possible that these monks originated in what is now Eritrea.

After the outbreak of the Eritrean War of Independence, many Eritreans fled their homes as refugees and asylum-seekers. During the war (1961-1991), an estimated 25,000 Eritreans sought refuge in Germany.

Eritrean supporters of the Eritrean People's Liberation Front (EPLF) had a strong presence in Germany. Eritrea Hilfswerk Deutschland is a German organization founded in 1976 which supported the EPLF's Eritrean Relief Association (which itself had a branch in Cologne). The Research and Information Centre on Eritrea, founded in London in 1979, had a branch in Germany as well.

== Geographic distribution ==
As of 2020, most Eritrean nationals residing in Germany live in Hesse, North Rhine-Westphalia, and Bavaria. The following table lists Eritrean population in German states.

Rank	State	Population (2020)
1	Hesse	9,780
2	North Rhine-Westphalia	8,865
3	Bavaria	8,160
4	Baden-Württemberg	5,510
5	Lower Saxony	2,585
6	Rhineland-Palatinate	2,530
7	Schleswig-Holstein	2,095
8	Hamburg	2,050
9	Saxony	1,475
10	Thuringia	1,325
11	Saxony-Anhalt	1,190
12	Brandenburg	1,065
13	Berlin	945
14	Saarland	670
15	Mecklenburg-Vorpommern	660
16	Bremen	395

== Notable people ==
- Afrob
- Joel Gerezgiher
- Robert Glatzel
- Nura (German rapper)

== See also ==
- Eritrea–Germany relations
