= Eritreans =

People from Eritrea and its diaspora

Total population
- Eritrea: 3.6–6.7 million Eritrean diaspora: ≥600,000

Regions with significant populations
- Eritrea: 3.6–6.7 million
- Ethiopia: 179,276
- Sudan: 159,748 (Eritrean-born)
- Germany: 84,000 (Eritrean citizens)
- United States: 71,777
- Sweden: 65,329
- Uganda: 49,913
- Saudi Arabia: 47,260
- Switzerland: 42,978
- Canada: 36,290
- Norway: 29,531
- Israel: 27,621
- England and Wales: 24,812
- United Arab Emirates: 17,916 (Eritrean-born)
- Italy: 13,592 (Eritrean-born)
- Australia: 9,383
- Denmark: 8,060
- France: 8,000
- Kuwait: 4,725 (Eritrean-born)
- South Sudan: 3,318 (Eritrean-born)
- Egypt: 2,368 (Eritrean-born)
- Netherlands: 2,150 (Eritrean-born)
- Kenya: 2,127 (Eritrean-born)
- Libya: 1,983 (Eritrean-born)
- Qatar: 1,854 (Eritrean-born)
- Finland: 1,642
- South Africa: 1,604 (Eritrean-born)
- Bahrain: 1,550 (Eritrean-born)
- Greece: 1,055
- Yemen: 1,009 (Eritrean-born)

Languages
- Tigrinya, Tigre, Kunama, Bilen, Nara, Saho, Afar, Beja, and other Languages of Eritrea

Religion
- Christian (Eritrean Orthodox, P'ent'ay, Catholic, Protestant), Muslim, Animism

Eritreans are the native inhabitants of Eritrea, as well as the global diaspora of Eritrea. Eritreans constitute several component ethnic groups, some of which are related to ethnic groups that make up the Ethiopian people in neighboring Ethiopia and people groups in other parts of the Horn of Africa. Nine of these component ethnic groups are officially recognized by the Government of Eritrea.

The Eritrean national identity began to develop during the Scramble for Africa, when Italy claimed Eritrea as one of its colonies. This marked the establishment of Eritrea's present-day borders. Following Italy's defeat in World War II and the subsequent British administration of Eritrea, the former colony was federated with Ethiopia in 1952. Tensions increased through the 1950s between Eritreans wishing for independence and the Ethiopian government, culminating in the Eritrean War of Independence.

== History ==
=== Ancient history ===
Eritrea is widely considered to have been part of the territory of the ancient Land of Punt, which was first recorded by the ancient Egyptians in the 25th century BC. Most of the area, along with northern Ethiopia, became part of Dʿmt from the 10th to 5th centuries BC. This area later became the centre of the Kingdom of Aksum in the 1st century BC. The 3rd century Iranian prophet Mani wrote that Aksum was one of four great powers of the world, along with Persia, Rome, and China. It is mentioned in the Periplus of the Erythraean Sea; the name Erythraean Sea refers to the Red Sea, and is the origin of the name Eritrea. Aksum began to decline in the mid 6th century, eventually collapsing by the end of the 10th century.

=== Medieval history ===
Following the fall of Aksum, the land of present-day Eritrea was part of Medri Bahri. This lasted until Italian colonization in 1889, however the coastal regions were ruled by other polities during this time. The Adal Sultanate conquered the coast under Badlay ibn Sa'ad ad-Din in the 15th century, and the Ottomans occupied the coast, incorporating into the empire as Habesh Eyalet.

=== Modern history ===
Eritrea, with its current borders, was established as a colony of the Kingdom of Italy in 1889. The colonial period saw a large influx of Italians to the country, particularly during the fascist period. However, despite the substantial Italian Eritrean community racial laws during the fascist period Italians and Africans were prohibited from marrying or having sexual relations under the Italian racial laws.

Eritrea was under British administration from 1941 to 1952, at which point it was federated with Ethiopia. The Eritrean War of Independence began on September 1, 1961, with the Battle of Adal, and ended on May 24, 1991. Eritrea officially gained independence in 1993; since then it has been governed by Isaias Afwerki, whose regime has been defined by an extremely poor human rights record. Many of the diaspora displaced by the Eritrean War of Independence seek refuge from human rights violations by the Eritrean government.

== Component ethnicities ==
=== Tigrinya ===
The majority of the Tigrinya inhabit the highlands of Eritrea; however, migration to other parts of the country has occurred. Their language is called Tigrinya and constituting about 35% of the population. The predominantly Tigrinya populated urban centers in Eritrea are the capital Asmara, Mendefera, Dekemhare, Adi Keyh, Adi Quala and Senafe.

They are 90% Christians, (of which 84% are of the Eritrean Orthodox faith, 5% Roman Catholic and Eastern Catholic (whose mass is held in Ge'ez as opposed to Latin), and 5% belonging to various Protestant and other Christian denominations, the majority of which belong to the Lutheran Evangelical Church of Eritrea. The Jeberti people in Eritrea trace descent from early Muslim adherents and settlers. The term Jeberti is also used to refer more generally to Muslim inhabitants of the highlands. The Jeberti in Eritrea speak Arabic and Tigrinya.

=== Tigre ===
The Tigre reside in the western lowlands in Eritrea. Many also migrated to Sudan at the time of the Ethiopian-Eritrean conflict and lived there since. They are a nomadic and pastoralist people, related to the Tigrinya and to the Beja people. They are a predominantly Muslim nomadic people who inhabit the northern, western, and coastal lowlands of Eritrea, where they constitute 51% of local residents. Some also inhabit areas in eastern Sudan. 95% of the Tigre people adhere to the Islamic religion Sunni Islam, but there are a small number of Christians among them as well (often referred to as the Mensaï in Eritrea). Their language is called Tigre.

=== Afar ===
According to the CIA, the Afar constitute under 5% of the nation's population. They live in the Debubawi Keyih Bahri Region of Eritrea, as well as the Afar Region in Ethiopia, and Djibouti. They speak the Afar language as a mother tongue, and are predominantly Muslim. Afars in Eritrea number about 397,000 individuals, the smallest population out of the countries they reside in. In Djibouti, there are about 780,000 group members, and in Ethiopia, they number approximately 1,300,000.

=== Saho ===
The Saho represent 4% of Eritrea's population. They principally reside in the Southern Region and the Northern Red Sea Region of Eritrea. Their language is called Saho. They are predominantly Muslim, although a few Christians known as the Irob live in the Debub Region of Eritrea and the Tigray region of Ethiopia.

=== Bilen ===
The Bilen in Eritrea represent around 2% of the country's population. They are primarily concentrated in the north-central areas, in and around the city of Keren, and south towards Asmara, the nation's capital. Many of them entered Eritrea from Kush (central Sudan) in the 8th century and settled at Merara, after which they went to Lalibela and Lasta. The Bilen then returned to Axum in Ethiopia's Tigray Province, and battled with the natives; in the resulting aftermath, the Bilen returned to their main base at Merara. The Bilen include adherents of both Islam and Christianity. They speak the Bilen as a mother tongue. Christian adherents are mainly urban and have intermingled with the Tigrinya who live in the area. Muslim adherents are mainly rural and have interbred with the adjacent Tigre.

=== Beja ===
The Beja in Eritrea, or Hedareb, constitute under 5% of local residents. They mainly live along the north-western border with Sudan. Group members are predominantly Muslim and communicate in Beja as a first or second language. The Beja also include the Beni-Amer people, who have retained their native Beja language alongside Tigre.

=== Kunama ===
According to the CIA, the Kunama constitute around 2% of Eritrea's population. They mainly live in the country's Gash Barka Region, as well as in adjacent parts of Ethiopia's Tigray Region. Many of them reside in the contested border village of Badme. Their language is called Kunama. Although some Kunama still practice traditional beliefs, most are converts to either Christianity (Roman Catholic and Protestant) or Islam.

=== Nara ===
The Nara represent under 5% of the nation's population. They principally reside along the south-western border with Sudan and Ethiopia. They are generally Muslim, with a few Christians and some practising their indigenous beliefs. Their language is called Nara.

=== Rashaida ===
The Rashaida are one of Eritrea's nine recognized ethnic groups. They represent around 2% of the population of Eritrea. The Rashaida reside in the northern coastal lowlands of Eritrea and the northern eastern coasts of Sudan. They are predominantly Muslim and are the only ethnic group in Eritrea to have Arabic as their mother tongue, specifically the Hejazi dialect. The Rashaida first came to Eritrea in the 19th century from the Arabian Coast.

=== Italians in Eritrea ===
A few monolingual Italian Eritreans remain. As of 2008, they were estimated at 900 people, down from around 38,000 residents at the end of World War II.

=== Eritrean diaspora ===
- Eritrean Americans
- Eritrean Australians
- Eritrean Canadians
- Eritreans in Italy
- Eritreans in the United Kingdom
- Eritreans in the Netherlands
- Eritreans in Denmark
- Eritreans in Israel
- Eritreans in Norway
- Eritreans in Sweden
- Eritreans in Switzerland
- Ethiopians
  - Eritrean people of Ethiopian descent
  - Ethiopian people of Eritrean descent

== Languages ==
Most languages spoken in Eritrea are from the Afroasiatic and Nilo-Saharan language family.

=== Afroasiatic languages ===
==== Semitic languages ====
- Tigrinya
- Tigre
- Arabic

==== Cushitic languages ====
- Beja
- Saho
- Afar
- Bilen

=== Nilo-Saharan languages ===
- Kunama
- Nara

=== Other languages ===
- Italian
- English

== See also ==
- Demographics of Eritrea
