= Eritreans in Italy =

Eritrean diaspora in Italy

- Eritrean population in Italy by province.

Total population
- 13,592 (Eritrean migrants in Italy) (2015); 6,912 (Eritrean foreign residents) (2021)

Languages
- Tigrinya · Tigre · Kunama · Nara · Afar, · Beja · Saho · Bilen · Arabic · English · Italian

Religion
- Christian (Eritrean Orthodox, Catholic) · Islam

== Introduction ==
Map showing the global distribution of the Eritrean diaspora.

Eritreans in Italy are residents of Italy who were born in Eritrea or are of Eritrean descent. According to the United Nations, there were 13,592 Eritrean migrants in Italy in 2015. The Eritreans are an important immigrant group in Italy, and have a deep historical connection with the country. Eritrea was a colony of Italy from 1890 to 1941. The combination of Eritrea's independence movement and its harsh rule after World War II prompted an increasing number of Eritreans to leave their homeland for Italy to find better living conditions and seek asylum. According to data from the Italian National Institute of Statistics (ISTAT) in 2023, there were approximately 16,500 legal residents of Eritrean origin in Italy. If including undocumented immigrants and naturalized citizens, the total number is estimated to be 25,000. Most Eritreans are widely distributed in major Italian cities such as Rome and Milan.

The Eritrean population in Italy continues to integrate into Italian society at a gradual pace. The Eritreans exist as a dual entity within the Italian social framework. The Eritrean community has shown their value to Italian society through their work in food service and sports as well as cultural activities. The Eritrean community faces multiple challenges including ethnic discrimination together with identity conflicts and disagreements about their ties to the present Eritrean government. Research shows that about 75% of Eritrean immigrants in Italy hold refugee status, and their living conditions are deeply influenced by Italian immigration policies such as the 2017 "Minniti-Orlando Law" restricting the right to asylum, and by the geopolitical dynamics between the EU and Africa.

== History ==
=== Italian colonial period (1890–1941) ===
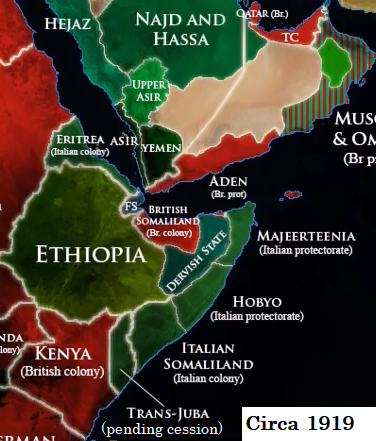
Historical map of Italian Eritrea during colonial rule.

Eritrea was officially designated as a colony by Italy in 1890 and Massawa was set as its administrative center. The colonial government promoted infrastructure construction and vigorously developed the economy, such as through the Asmara–Massawa Railway, which required a large number of Eritrean laborers. Some of them were recruited to Italy for low-skilled jobs, including dock workers, servants, laborers, or soldiers in the colonial army. At the same time, the Italian colonial authorities encouraged small-scale Eritrean elites to go to Italy for study and training, in order to cultivate officials or technicians to serve the colonial administrative system.

During this period, immigration made Italian the common language for the upper classes in Eritrea. In terms of religion, Catholicism spread alongside the local Orthodox Christianity.However, racial segregation policies implemented during the colonial era, such as the Racial Law of 1938, restricted the rights of Eritreans and contributed to the emergence of the subsequent independence movement.

=== World War II and its aftermath (1941–1960) ===
The Italian control of Eritrea ended in 1941 when World War II started. The region became subject to British military governance from 1941 until 1952. The Italian forces who retreated from Eritrea brought some Eritrean people to settle in Italy. The Italian colonial officials together with veterans and intellectuals formed the families who migrated to Italy. The Eritrean People's Liberation Front (EPLF) initiated an armed independence movement after Eritrea joined a federation with Ethiopia through a United Nations resolution in 1952. The Italian government maintained economic relations with Eritrea after losing its colonial control. The Italian shipping companies together with other businesses in Italy maintained their workforce of Eritrean employees while keeping their immigration connections active. The connection between Italy and Eritrea remained strong through scholarship programs which allowed Eritrean students to study abroad.

=== Eritrean independence struggle and refugee migration (1960s–1990s) ===
Since the 1960s and beyond that time period, in history Eritrea faced increasing turmoil as a result of Ethiopia's takeover of the region in 1962 which sparked a struggle for freedom. The prolonged conflict known as the Eritrean War of Independence (1961–1991) caused an exodus of people fleeing their homeland; a great number of them sought refuge in Europe with a preference, for Italy because of its historical connections and established community networks there.

Throughout this time frame, in history Italy emerged as a haven for political refugees. Numerous migrants were provided with asylum or residency permissions due to reasons. The Eritrean migrant groups started establishing lasting communities in urban areas like Rome, Milan and Bologna with the backing of church affiliated bodies and leftist political factions in Italy who felt a kinship to the Eritrean struggle, for independence.

The Cold War era migration flows helped create lasting transnational connections between Italy and Eritrea. The liberation movement received financial and moral backing through Eritrean cultural associations and family reunification chains and remittance systems.

=== Post-2000 migration patterns and contemporary issues (2000–present) ===
Since Eritrea became independent in 1993; the flow of migrants, to Italy has kept increasing as a result of oppression and economic challenges back in their home country after gaining independence. The migration trend escalated in the 2000s due to the impact of the War from 1998 to 2000 which worsened both political and humanitarian situations, in Eritrea.

The flow of immigrants, to Italy persisted during the 2000 and 2010 decades; a number arrived by sea through the Mediterranean waters as part of a larger trend of migration from Sub-Saharan Africa to Europe where Italy served as a common initial destination point, for migrants coming ashore. By the 2010 era came around Italy encountered hurdles regarding asylum requests and the assimilation of migrants; Eritreans constituted one of the groups seeking safety and shelter.

At the same time, Italy's asylum policies, particularly the 2017 "Minniti-Orlando Law", which imposed stricter immigration controls, have affected the experiences of Eritrean migrants. These policies, alongside the broader European Union's externalization of border control, made it more difficult for migrants to obtain asylum, though many Eritreans were granted refugee status based on the ongoing human rights violations in their home country.

Recently in Italy Eritrean migrants have been progressively becoming part of the community by contributing to fields such, as agriculture and cultural events despite encountering obstacles like ethnic bias and challenges with assimilation into both societies. They also face complexities in their ties with the community and the Eritrean government. A significant number of Eritreans opt to stay in Italy as returning to Eritrea is not an option due, to the political environment that poses threats to ex soldiers and refugees alike.

Italy has had a connection with Eritrea since the acquisition of Assab in 1869 by Raffaele Rubattino. Eritrea officially became an Italian colony in 1889. Prior to the racial laws of Fascist Italy, mixed race children of Italian fathers and Eritrean mothers were entitled to Italian citizenship, as long as they were legally recognized by their fathers. Since Eritrea's independence, Italy has become a destination for Eritrean migrants and asylum seekers.

== Demographics ==
According to the Italian National Institute of Statistics (ISTAT), as of 2023, there were approximately 16,500 legal residents of Eritrean origin in Italy. Including undocumented immigrants and naturalized citizens, the estimated total number is around 25,000.

As of 2021, most Eritrean nationals residing in Italy live in Rome, Milan, and Bologna. The following table lists Italian provinces by Eritrean population.

| Rank | Province | Population (2021) |
|---|---|---|
| 1 | Rome | 1790 |
| 2 | Milan | 1373 |
| 3 | Bologna | 462 |
| 4 | Parma | 167 |
| 5 | Bari | 163 |
| 6 | Turin | 152 |
| 7 | Florence | 127 |
| 8 | Catania | 118 |
| 9 | Bergamo | 108 |
| 10 | Ragusa | 87 |
| 11 | Naples | 79 |
| 11 | Syracuse | 79 |
| 13 | Venice | 75 |
| 14 | Trapani | 69 |
| 15 | Verona | 65 |
| 16 | Lodi | 64 |
| 17 | Brescia | 58 |
| 18 | Vicenza | 57 |
| 19 | Reggio Calabria | 55 |
| 20 | Agrigento | 53 |
| 21 | Genoa | 52 |
| 22 | Pescara | 51 |
| 23 | Lecco | 50 |
| 24 | Varese | 48 |
| 25 | Latina | 44 |
| 26 | Pordenone | 43 |
| 27 | Udine | 42 |
| 28 | Piacenza | 40 |
| 29 | Cosenza | 39 |
| 30 | Cremona | 37 |
| 30 | Reggio Emilia | 37 |
| 32 | Palermo | 36 |
| 33 | Ancona | 35 |
| 34 | Brindisi | 34 |
| 34 | Como | 34 |
| 34 | Rieti | 34 |
| 34 | Terni | 34 |
| 38 | Perugia | 33 |
| 39 | Campobasso | 32 |
| 39 | Lecce | 32 |
| 39 | Pistoia | 32 |
| 42 | Trentino | 31 |
| 43 | Ravenna | 30 |
| 44 | Monza and Brianza | 29 |
| 44 | Sassari | 29 |
| 46 | Crotone | 28 |
| 46 | Fermo | 28 |
| 46 | Forli-Cesena | 28 |
| 46 | Vercelli | 28 |
| 50 | Matera | 27 |
| 51 | Padova | 24 |
| 51 | Prato | 24 |
| 51 | Teramo | 24 |
| 54 | Modena | 23 |
| 55 | Pisa | 22 |
| 56 | Caserta | 20 |
| 56 | Mantua | 20 |
| 58 | Asti | 19 |
| 58 | Messina | 19 |
| 58 | Rimini | 19 |
| 58 | Treviso | 19 |
| 62 | Chieti | 18 |
| 62 | L'Aquila | 18 |
| 62 | Pavia | 18 |
| 65 | Salerno | 17 |
| 65 | Taranto | 17 |
| 67 | Arezzo | 16 |
| 67 | Cuneo | 16 |
| 69 | Benevento | 15 |
| 69 | Cagliari | 15 |
| 69 | Lucca | 15 |
| 69 | Massa-Carrara | 15 |
| 73 | Biella | 14 |
| 74 | Frosinone | 13 |
| 75 | Savona | 12 |
| 75 | South Tyrol | 12 |
| 75 | Viterbo | 12 |
| 78 | Potenza | 10 |
| 78 | Siena | 10 |
| 78 | Sondrio | 10 |
| 81 | Alessandria | 9 |
| 81 | Livorno | 9 |
| 83 | Avellino | 8 |
| 83 | Caltanissetta | 8 |
| 83 | Macerata | 8 |
| 83 | Trieste | 8 |
| 87 | Ferrara | 7 |
| 88 | Aosta Valley | 6 |
| 88 | Ascoli Piceno | 6 |
| 88 | Catanzaro | 6 |
| 88 | Imperia | 6 |
| 92 | Enna | 5 |
| 92 | Foggia | 5 |
| 92 | Grosseto | 5 |
| 92 | La Spezia | 5 |
| 92 | Rovigo | 5 |
| 97 | Belluno | 4 |
| 97 | Novara | 4 |
| 97 | Nuoro | 4 |
| 97 | Vibo Valentia | 4 |
| 101 | Pesaro and Urbino | 2 |
| 102 | Barletta-Andria-Trani | 1 |
| 102 | Isernia | 1 |
| 102 | Verbano-Cusio-Ossola | 1 |
| 105 | Gorizia | 0 |
| 105 | Oristano | 0 |
| N/A | South Sardinia | Information unavailable |

== Cultural influence and economic contribution ==
=== Cultural influence ===
- Ethiopian cuisine has become popular in Italy throughout its major cities including Rome, Milan and Turin. The colonial ties between Italy and Ethiopia have led to some degree of cultural exchange between their culinary traditions. The traditional Ethiopian coffee ceremony has shaped Italian coffeehouse culture while some Italian chefs now use Ethiopian spices in their vegetarian restaurants.
- Ethiopian music and art maintain significant value within the Italian immigrant cultural community particularly in world music and hip-hop and contemporary art.
- Ethiopian Italians join forces with social movements and organizations that fight racial discrimination and immigrant rights while working to enhance multicultural policies and immigrant integration policies.

=== Economic contribution ===
- According to a 2022 study by the Italian Ministry of Labor (Ministero del Lavoro), immigrant laborers (including Eritreans) contributed 9.5% to Italy's GDP. In certain industries (such as domestic services and agriculture), the proportion of immigrant workers was as high as over 50%.
- Although Eritreans face economic difficulties, they have demonstrated strong entrepreneurial spirit in small businesses, catering, retail, and international trade. There are over 2,000 Eritrean-owned enterprises in Italy, with 35% engaged in food and catering, 25% in small retail (such as grocery stores and clothing stores), and 20% in beauty and hair salons.
- Eritrean immigrants connect the Italian and Eritrean markets through international trade, especially in food, clothing, and handicrafts.
- Due to the Italian social security system relying on the tax and social security contributions of the labor force, Eritrean immigrants have also played an active role in the pension and medical insurance systems.

== Notable Eritrean-Italians ==
- Melissa Chimenti, Italian actress and singer
- Elvira Banotti, writer, journalist, feminist activist
- Alessandro Ghebreigziabiher, writer, storyteller, stage actor
- Gabriella Ghermandi, writer and performer
- Ines Pellegrini, an Italian retired actress of Eritrean origin
- Senhit, an Italian pop signer

== Integration and Challenges ==
=== Educational and language barriers ===
According to the report of the Italian National Institute of Statistics (ISTAT), as of 2022, approximately 75% of the second-generation Eritrean immigrants have completed secondary education (high school or vocational school), but the proportion entering universities is still lower than that of Italian natives. Inability to speak Italian is the main obstacle for Eritrean adults to integrate into society. In 2021, about 45% of Eritrean immigrant children need additional Italian language support courses when entering school, which is higher than other immigrant groups.

=== Employment and economic integration ===
Eritreans in Italy mainly engage in low-paying manual labor in the labor market and face higher unemployment rates and occupational discrimination. According to the data of the Italian Ministry of Labor in 2022, only 25% of Eritrean immigrants are employed in the formal economic sector, while the majority work in the informal economy (lavoro nero), lacking social security. First-generation immigrants are concentrated in low-skilled industries (housekeeping 33%, construction 28%) and are affected by language restrictions. Second-generation Eritreans have increased upward mobility opportunities (university enrollment rate 42%), but still face a "glass ceiling" in the workplace. Only 18% are engaged in professional positions, and most remain in the service industry.

=== Social discrimination and identity ===
According to the survey of the Italian Anti-Racism Association (ASGI) in 2021, approximately 40% of Eritrean immigrants reported experiencing racial discrimination, mainly in job hunting, housing rental, and police checks. Italian-born Eritrean young people face cultural identity issues. They inherit Eritrean traditions in their families but are recognized as "foreigners" in society. Some Eritrean young people feel socially excluded due to identity issues and are vulnerable to the influence of criminal groups or extremist ideologies. Inability to speak Italian is also cited as the main obstacle for Eritrean adults to integrate into society.

== Future Development ==
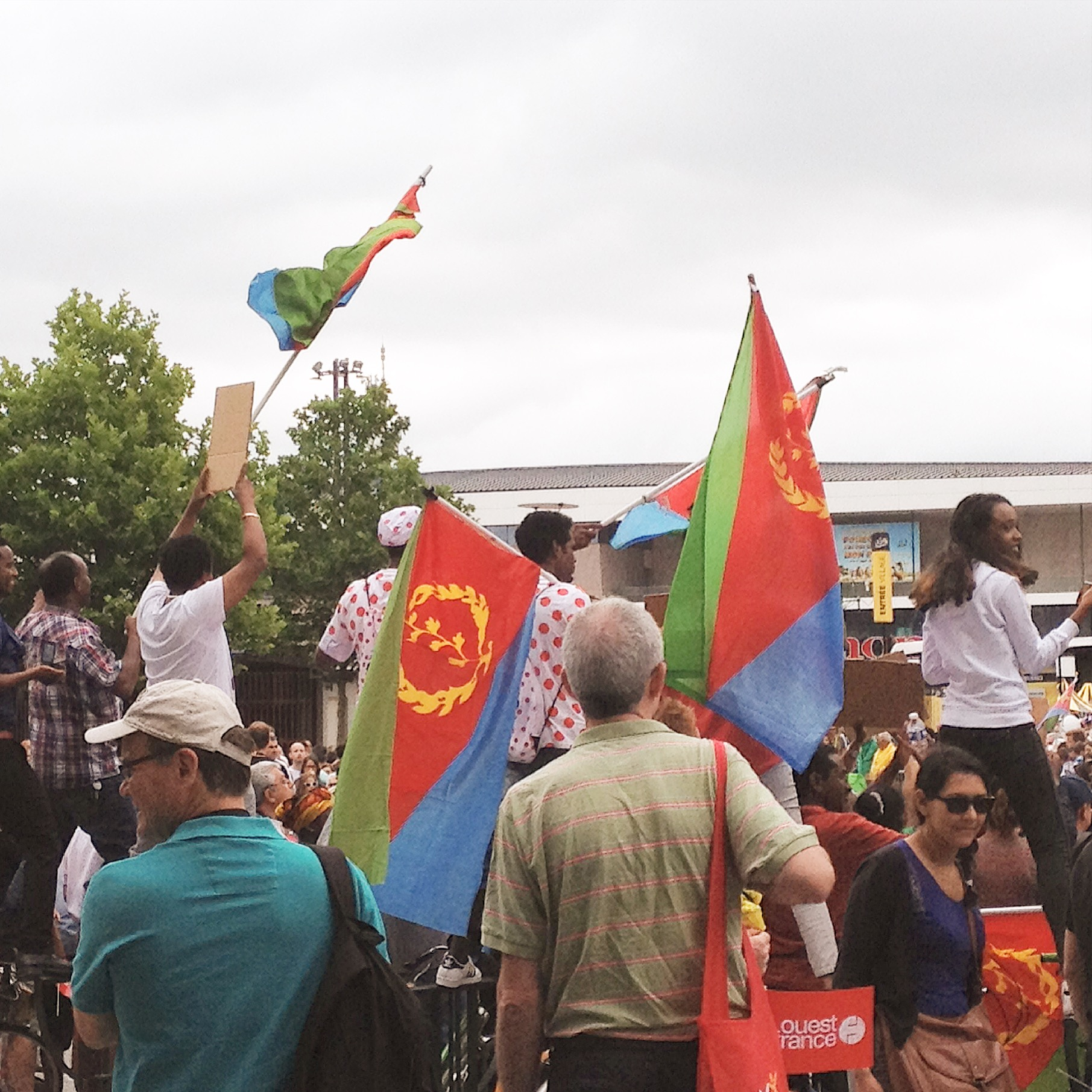
Eritrean diaspora members supporting a cycling event in Rennes, France.

=== Impact of Policy Changes ===
Immigration Policy: under the Italian government stands as a direct factor which determines both life quality and integration success of Eritrean immigrants. The strictness of immigration policies determines how difficult it will be for immigrants to acquire legal status and employment but lenient policies help immigrants adapt better to society.

Social Services: Public services such as education and healthcare along with housing will determine whether Eritrean immigrants receive equivalent public service access from the government. Proper social services provide better living conditions and social standing for immigrants.

=== Social Attitudes and Cultural Integration ===
Public perception: The way Italian society views Eritrean immigrants will either advance or impede their process of social integration. Positive social attitudes toward Eritreans will decrease discrimination while creating opportunities for cultural diversity dialogue.

Cultural activities: The Eritrean communities should organize cultural events including concerts and art exhibitions to show their cultural identity while fostering relationships with local residents.

=== Economic Opportunities and Challenges ===
Employment Market: Eritrean immigrants will find work based on how Italy's economy expands alongside market labor requirements. They must develop their abilities to match the shifting demands of the modern employment sector.

Entrepreneurship Support: Eritrean immigrants can start businesses through entrepreneurial training combined with financial backing to achieve economic independence.

=== Education and the Next Generation ===
Educational Opportunities: The quality of education for Eritrean immigrant children will enable them to integrate into Italian society while ending the cycle of poverty

Vocational Training: programs should be provided to younger individuals who wish to enter skilled industrial sectors and boost their job market chances.

=== Community Organizations and Political Participation ===
Community Organizations: The organization should strengthen Eritrean community organizations in their capacity building and their impact on local decision making.

Political participation: Eritrean immigrants should participate actively in political life through voting and election contests to make sure their needs get represented in government policies.

== Relations with Eritrea ==
The Eritrean population living in Italy experiences an intricate web of relationships with their native homeland. Various elements including historical background and emotional connections and political factors determine the community ties which reflect different immigration backgrounds and political attitudes.

The political persecution along with mandatory military service and conflicts under the authoritarian regime forced many Eritreans to migrate to Italy. The Eritrean immigrants in Italy mostly hold negative opinions toward their homeland because of their disapproval about the human rights abuses and limited democratic freedoms in Eritrea. Human Rights Watch and Amnesty International state that the long military service period and political repression act as the main factors that force Eritreans to leave their homeland.

Numerous people from the diaspora maintain powerful emotional and cultural connections to their Eritrean roots despite political disagreements. Eritrean Italians frequently send money to their Eritrean relatives and fund community initiatives as well as participate in traditional Eritrean cultural events like religious celebrations and music performances. The Eritrean diaspora tax which requires a 2% income tax has faced criticism from Italy and the European Union as it targets remittances sent by Eritreans living abroad.

Eritrea established official diplomatic relations with Italy after gaining independence in 1993 to conduct economic and migration-related cooperation. Human rights issues have led international organizations to maintain cautious relations with the Eritrean government. Some Eritrean community organizations in Italy work as advocacy groups that raise public awareness about Eritrea's political situation and support democratic changes.

Young Eritrean Italians often maintain dual identity through their cultural pride in Eritrean heritage while maintaining political independence from Eritrean state authority. Members of this group maintain cultural ties through dance schools and festivals yet they feel disconnected from their homeland because they have never experienced it firsthand through elders' stories.

The Eritrean diaspora in Italy maintains a dual relationship with Eritrea through their united cultural traditions and political disagreements and solidarity bonds.

== See also ==
- Immigration to Italy
- Eritrean diaspora
- Colonial history of Eritrea
- Horn of Africa
- Italian Eritrea
