= Eritreans in Switzerland =

Eritrean diaspora in Switzerland

ኤርትራውያን ኣብ ስዊዘርላንድ (Tigrinya) Eritreer in der Schweiz (German)

Total population
- 37,339 (2025)

Regions with significant populations
- Zurich, Bern, Lucerne, Basel

Languages
- Tigrinya, Tigre, Kunama, Afar, German, French, Italian

Religion
- Christian (Eritrean Orthodox, Catholic), Islam

Eritreans in Switzerland are citizens or residents of Switzerland who were born in Eritrea or are of Eritrean descent. As of 2025, there are 37,339 Eritreans living in Switzerland. Eritreans also form Switzerland's largest immigrant group from an African country.

== History ==
The first interaction between Germany and Eritrea began in 1960s when Switzerland built bilateral relations with several African countries, including Ethiopia, of which Eritrea was then part.

Many Eritreans fled to Switzerland since the outbreak of Eritrean War of Independence where they came as refugees and asylum-seekers. Due to strict Swiss immigration laws, many Eritreans moved from Switzerland to Germany and Sweden.

Eritreans in Switzerland formed a little football league named "Eri Swiss league". Eri Basel, formed in 2020 was the first Swiss football team formed by Eritrean communities.

== Demographics ==
The cantons of both Zurich and Bern hold large Eritrean community, numbering more than 5,000 people. Zurich is the Swiss city with the largest Eritrean community, as 3,385 Eritreans lived in the city, as of 2024.

Numbers of Eritreans in Swiss cantons
#	Canton	People
1.	Zurich	5,834
2.	Bern	5,386
3.	Aargau	3,503
4.	Vaud	3,089
5.	Lucerne	2,489
6.	St. Gallen	2,475
7.	Geneva	2,016
8.	Solothurn	1,735
9.	Basel-Stadt	1,476
10.	Fribourg	1,412

== See also ==
- Demographics of Eritrea
- Eritreans in Germany
- Eritreans in Sweden
