= Eritrean Americans =

Americans of Eritrean birth or descent

ኤርትራውያን ኣሜሪካውያን (Tigrinya)

Total population
- 39,063 (Eritrea-born, 2015); 18,917 (Eritrean ancestry)

Regions with significant populations
- New York City; Boston; Philadelphia; Columbus; Indianapolis; Lansing; Chicago; Milwaukee; Washington, D.C.; Atlanta; Miami; Minneapolis; Houston; Dallas; Seattle; Portland; Denver; Los Angeles; San Francisco Bay Area; San Diego

Languages
- Tigrinya; Tigre; Kunama; Bilen; Nara; Saho; Afar; Arabic; American English; Italian

Religion
- Christianity (Eritrean Orthodox, Eritrean Catholic, P’ent’ay); Sunni Islam

Eritrean Americans are an ethnic group (or hyphenated ethnicity) of Americans who are of full or partial Eritrean national origin, heritage, or ancestry.

== History ==
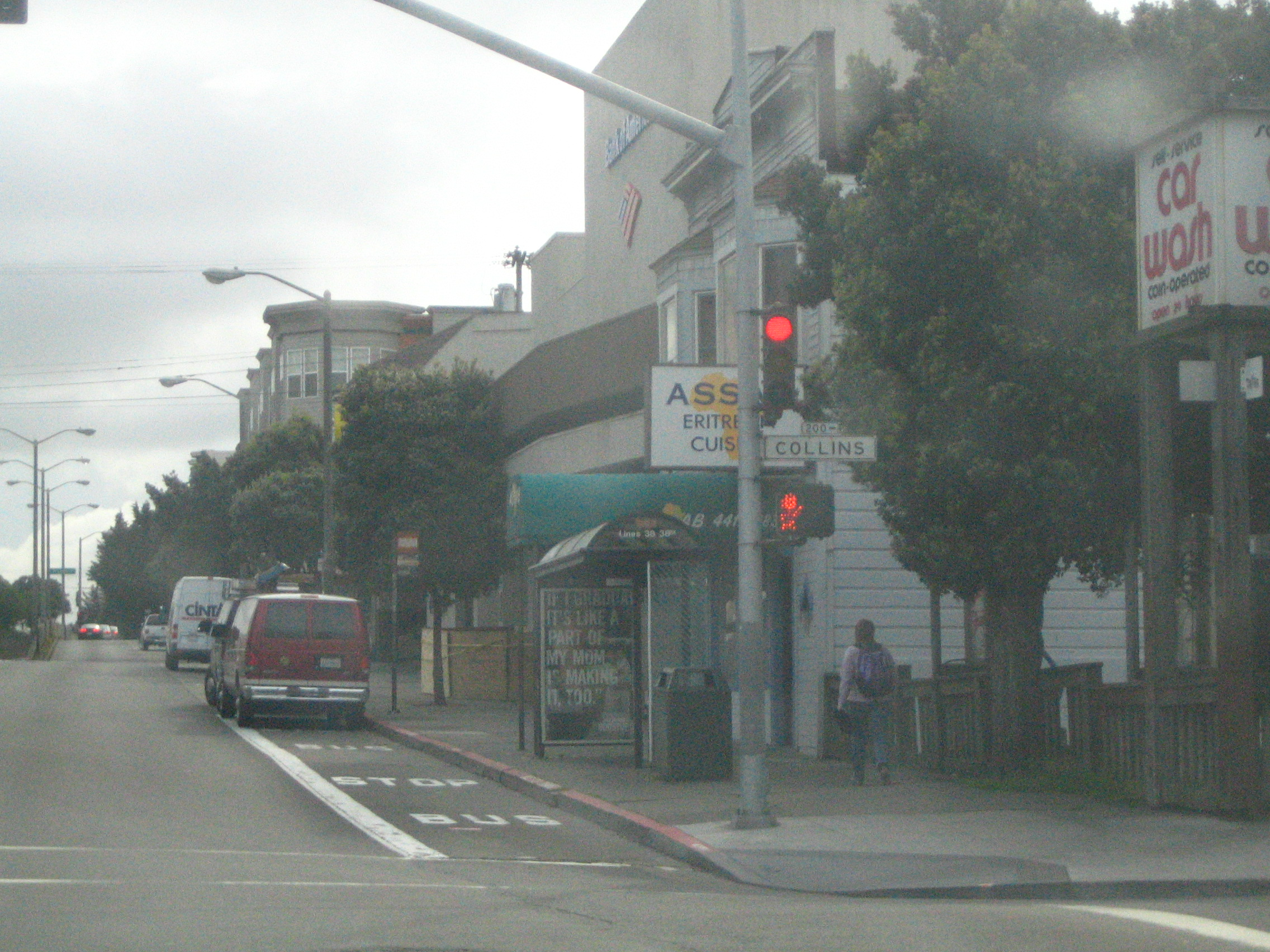
An Eritrean restaurant in San Francisco

Eritrea gained independence from Ethiopia on May 24, 1991, after the Eritrean War of Independence. Since the inception of the war in the 1960s, many immigrants from Eritrea left for the United States. By 2000, the Eritrean community in the U.S. had grown to around 30,000 members.

Eritrean Americans have since established ethnic enclaves in various places around the country, particularly in the Washington, D.C. area. Fairfax Avenue in Los Angeles, California has come to be known as Little Ethiopia, owing to its many Ethiopian and Eritrean businesses and restaurants. The Temescal neighborhood of Oakland, California has many Ethiopian and Eritrean businesses and restaurants. Additionally, Eritreans have opened a number of garages and auto repair shops. They also run several taxi establishments, including the Eritrean Cab company based in San Diego.

== Demographics ==
The exact number of Eritrean residents in the United States is unknown because Eritreans were listed as Ethiopian nationals prior to Eritrea's independence in the early 1990s. According to the U.S. Census Bureau, approximately 18,917 people reported Eritrean ancestry in 2000. Between 2007 and 2011, there were approximately 25,848 Eritrea-born residents in the country. California had the most Eritrean-born residents (4,782), followed by Virginia (3,417), Texas (2,693), and Maryland (1,902).

Most Eritrean immigrants are concentrated in Washington D.C., Arizona, and California, especially the San Francisco Bay Area. The community also has a notable presence in the Seattle, Columbus, Minneapolis, Chicago, New York, Atlanta, Houston, Denver, Portland and Dallas metropolitan areas.

== Culture ==
Injera is a widely favored dish among Eritrean Americans. Eritrean Americans utilize injera to gather spicy stews, sautéed greens, and various sauces.

== Community organizations ==
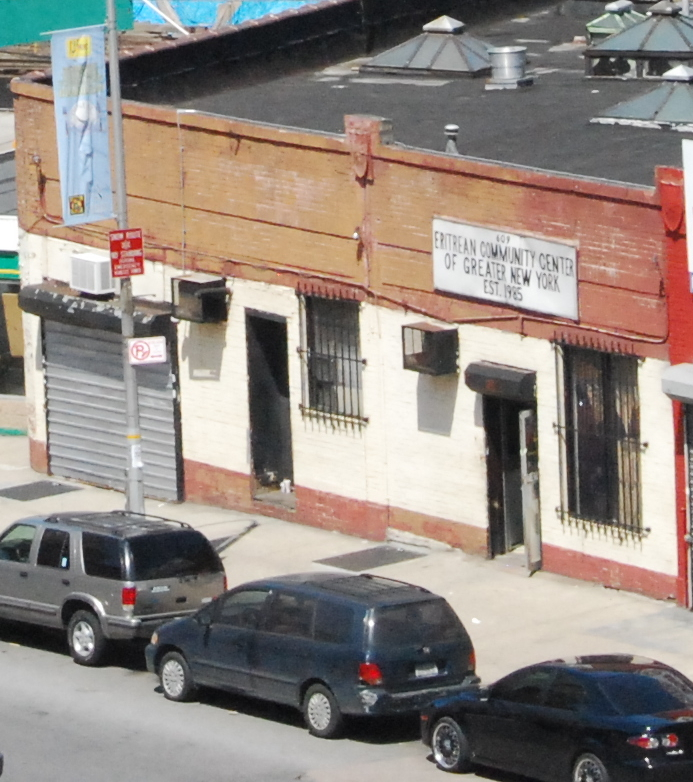
The Eritrean Community Center of Greater New York.

The Eritrean community in the United States is represented by various Eritrean-run organizations. Among these are the Eritrean American Community Association of Georgia, Eritrean American Community in the Washington D.C. metropolitan area, Eritrean Community Center of Greater New York, Eritrean American Community in Dallas, Eritrean Community Association in Chicago, Eritrean Community Center of Minnesota, Eritrean Association in Greater Seattle, and Eritrean American Community in Sacramento.

In 2001, a chapter of the Eritrean Liberation Front–Revolutionary Council was also established in Chicago. The National Union of Eritrean Women likewise routinely holds meetings and activities in the city.

Additionally, the Virginia-based Eritrean Sports Federation in North America (ERSFNA) annually hosts a soccer tournament for Eritrean residents. It also organizes adult and youth sports community programs in various U.S. cities.

The Eritrean Muslims Association in North America (EMANA) and Eritrean Muslims Council (EMC) serve the Eritrean community's Muslim adherents. Christians also gather in a number of Eritrean Orthodox, Protestant and Roman Catholic churches.

== Notable people ==
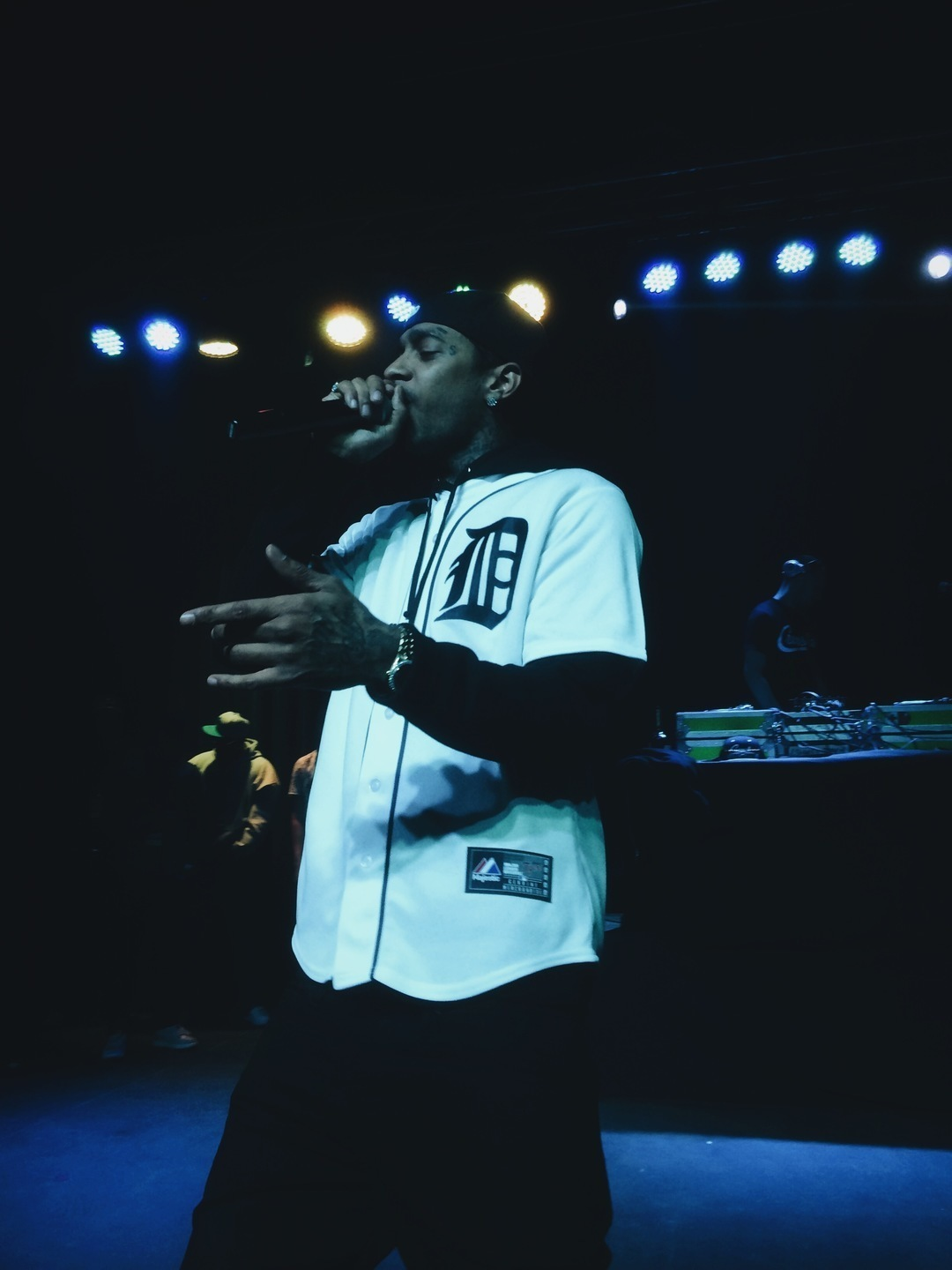
Rapper Nipsey Hussle in 2014

- Aminé - rapper
- Rubi Rose - rapper
- Azie Tesfai - Eritrean American actress, known for her television roles, including Jane the Virgin and Supergirl
- Nipsey Hussle (1985-2019) - Ermias Joseph Asghedom, known professionally as Nipsey Hussle, was partially Eritrean and an American rapper, songwriter, entrepreneur, community activist, philanthropist, and actor
- Ebony Obsidian - Eritrean American actress known for her role in The Six Triple Eight
- Lay Bankz - rapper
- Semhar Araia - Eritrean political activist, professor and international lawyer
- Bereket Habteslassie - Eritrean American scholar, freedom fighter, professor, international lawyer and political activist
- Selamawi Asgedom - Eritrean-Ethiopian author and public speaker
- Asmeret Asefaw Berhe - soil biogeochemist and political ecologist
- Nat Berhe - partially Eritrean football player who is currently a free agent in the NFL; the first player of Eritrean descent drafted into the league
- Eriam Sisters - Eritrean musical group consisting of three sisters
- Haile Debas - physician and academic administrator at the University of California, San Francisco
- Haben Girma - Disability rights advocate, first deafblind graduate of Harvard Law School
- Tiffany Haddish - partially Eritrean comedian and actress
- J Holiday - American born Eritrean singer
- Meb Keflezighi - Eritrean athlete and long-distance runner
- Thomas Kelati - American-born Polish professional basketball player of Eritrean heritage
- Joe Neguse - Eritrean U.S. House of Representative from Colorado's 2nd congressional district
- Ella Thomas - Eritrean-born actress, model and producer
- Lily Yohannes - Player on the women's United States women's national soccer team

== See also ==
- Eritrean people
- Eritrea–United States relations
- Habesha peoples
