= Eritreans in Sweden =

Eritrean diaspora in Sweden

Total population
- 45,734

Regions with significant populations
- Stockholm, Gothenburg, Malmö, Sundsvall

Languages
- Tigrinya · Tigre · Kunama · Nara · Afar, · Beja · Saho · Bilen · Arabic · English · Swedish

Religion
- Eritrean Orthodox Tewahedo Church, Islam

Eritreans in Sweden are citizens and residents of Sweden who are of Eritrean descent.

== History ==
The history of Eritreans in Sweden can be traced back to at least the 19th century. Tewolde-Medhin Gebre-Medhin, an Eritrean bible translator, studied theology in Stockholm from 1883 to 1887.

In 2014, the first secretary at the Eritrean embassy in Sweden was asked to leave the country due to having organised espionage on Eritrean migrants in Sweden.

In 2016 Swedish Television reported that the Swedish Migration Agency had hired regime sympathisers as interpreters to interrogate migrants from Eritrea. The interpreters stated that if migrants spoke ill of the government of Eritrea their relatives still in country might suffer reprisals.

In 2023 violent clashes occurred at the Eritrea Scandinavia cultural festival at Järvafältet in northern Stockholm. A large group of anti-government Eritrean protesters broke through police barriers and entered the festival area. They tore down tents, threw stones, used sticks and similar objects as weapons, and set tents and vehicles on fire. At least 52 people were injured, several of them seriously, including police officers. Around one hundred individuals were detained by police during the unrest. Following the incident, police initiated investigations into offences including violent rioting, arson, and obstruction of emergency services. In March 2025, Swedish authorities reported that six individuals had been sentenced to prison for participation in the riot. The festival has long been criticised for alleged ties to the Eritrean government, with opponents claiming it functions as a propaganda platform and a fundraising event in support of the regime.

== Demographics ==
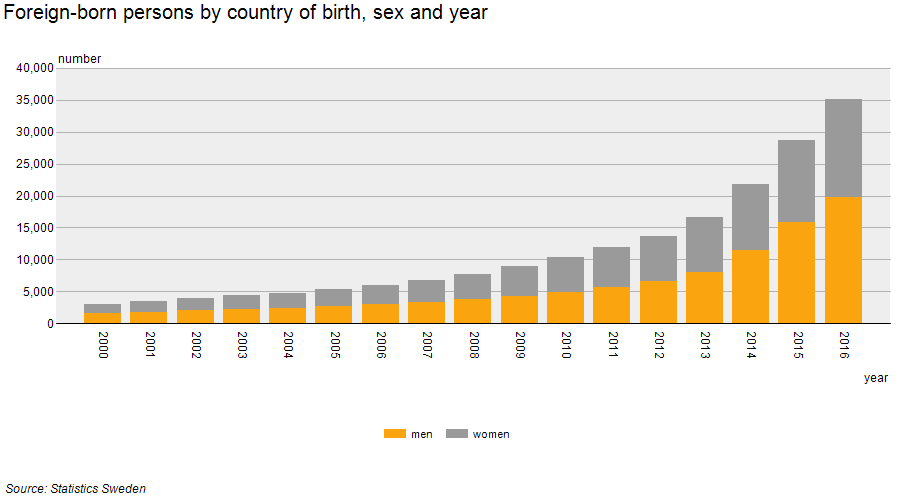
Eritrea-born persons in Sweden by sex, 2000-2016 (Statistics Sweden).

According to Statistics Sweden, as of 2019, there are a total 45,734 Eritrea-born immigrants living in Sweden. Of those, 39,728 are citizens of Eritrea (22,705 men, 17,023 women). In 2016, there were also 19 registered remigrations from Sweden to Eritrea.

== Education ==
In 2010, there were 1,460 students with Tigrinya as their mother tongue who participated in the state-run Swedish for Immigrants adult language program. Of these pupils, 399 had 0–6 years of education in their home country (Antal utbildningsår i hemlandet), 283 had 7–9 years of education in their home country, and 778 had 10 years education or more in their home country. As of 2012, 3,623 pupils with Tigrinya as their mother tongue and 3,618 Eritrea-born students were enrolled in the language program.

According to Statistics Sweden, as of 2016, 40% of Eritrea-born individuals aged 25 to 64 have attained Swedish primary education level (37% men, 45% women), 40% have attained a secondary education level (41% men, 39% women), 10% have attained a post-secondary education level of less than 3 years (12% men, 7% women), 7% have attained a post-secondary education of 3 years or more (8% men, 4% women), and 3% have attained an unknown education level (2% men, 4% women).

== Employment ==
According to Statistics Sweden, as of 2014, Eritrea-born immigrants aged 25–64 in Sweden have an employment rate of approximately 43%. The share of employment among these foreign-born individuals varies according to education level, with employment rates of around 29% (29% males, 29% females) among Eritrea-born individuals who have attained a primary and lower secondary education level (5,668 individuals), 54% (54% males, 54% females) among those who have attained an upper secondary level (6,153 individuals), 47% (46% males, 48% females) among those who have attained a post-secondary education level of less than 3 years (1,338 individuals), and 62% (60% males, 66% females) among those who have attained a post-secondary education level of 3 years or more (1,012 individuals).

According to the Institute of Labor Economics, as of 2014, Eritrea-born residents in Sweden have an employment population ratio of about 57%. They also have an unemployment rate of approximately 7%.

== Notable people ==
- Alexander Isak - Football player of Eritrean descent raised in Solna, Sweden
- Henok Goitom - Football player of Eritrean descent raised in Solna, Sweden

== See also ==
- Demographics of Eritrea
- Education in Eritrea
- Education in Sweden
