= ILIT =

ILIT may refer to:

- Life insurance trust
- Intralymphatic immunotherapy

Ilit may refer to:

- Ilit language
