= Eritreans in Denmark =

Total population
- 5,703

Regions with significant populations
- Aarhus, Hjørring, Silkeborg, Odense, Copenhagen

Languages
- Tigrinya, Tigre, Arabic, Danish

Religion
- Eritrean Orthodox Tewahedo Church, Islam

Eritreans in Denmark are citizens and residents of Denmark who are of Eritrean descent. According to Statistics Denmark, as of 2017, there are a total 5,703 persons of Eritrean origin living in Denmark. Of those individuals, 5,170 are Eritrean-born immigrants and 533 are descendants of Eritrean-born persons.

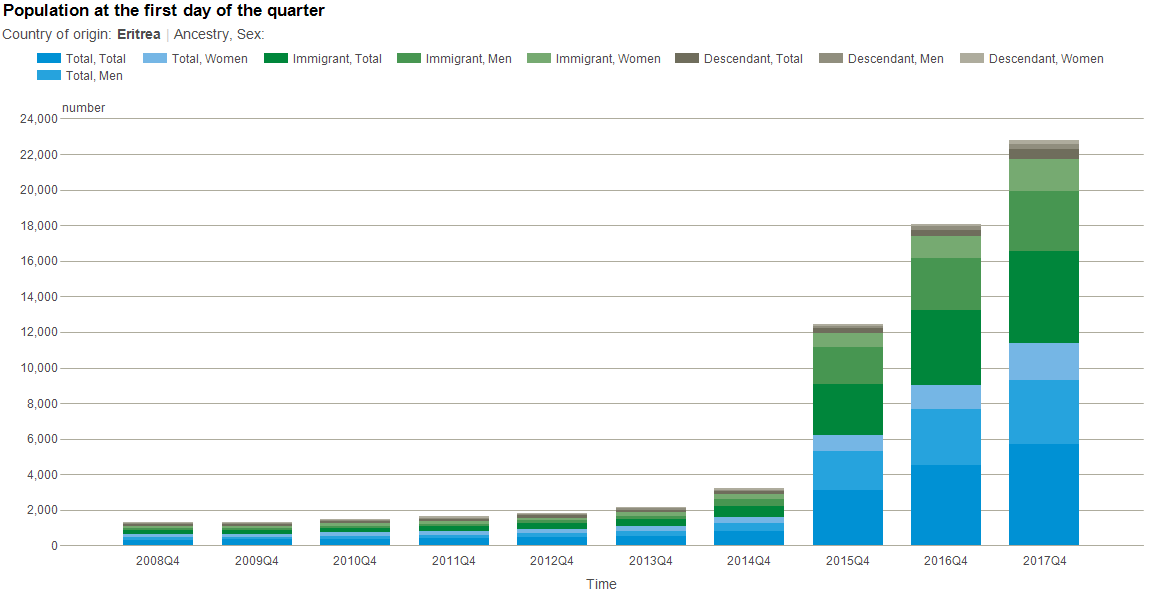
Population of Eritrean origin in Denmark by sex, yearly fourth quarter 2008-2017 (Statistics Denmark).

5,439 individuals are citizens of Eritrea (3,498 men, 1,941 women). As of 2016, a total of 563 Eritrean-born persons have been granted residence permits in Denmark for family reunification, 532 for asylum, 1 for study, 2 for work, and 1 for other reasons.

Eritrean residents are generally young, with most belonging to the 25–29 years (1,482 individuals), 20–24 years (859 individuals), 30–34 years (831 individuals) and 0–4 years (618 individuals) age groups. They primarily inhabit the regions of Hovedstaden (1,082), Midtjylland (1,357), Nordjylland (1,175), Sjælland (1,175), and Syddanmark (914), and the cities of Aarhus (191), Hjørring (181), Silkeborg (180), Odense (179), and Copenhagen (177).

== See also ==
- Demographics of Eritrea
