= Eritrean diaspora =

Eritreans living abroad

Eritreans around the world

The Eritrean diaspora comprises about half of the population living in the country, making it one of the most diasporic nations. In addition, one third of Eritreans live abroad. In 2022, 37,357 Eritreans fled to Sudan, Egypt and Libya to seek asylum, estimated to be about 1% of the nation's population. Since 2001, 700,000 people have fled the country as a result of political repression under Isaias Afwerki. In 2015, approximately 40,000 Eritreans arrived in Europe via the Mediterranean. Eritrea has become a small country with a large number of refugees in Africa and elsewhere.

== History ==
Many Eritreans scattered from their homes during the Eritrean War of Independence (1961–1991). In the mid-1950s, one-third of Eritreans lived abroad and emigration has increased largely due to political instability in the country and surrounding region. Emperor Haile Selassie decreed the Ethiopian Orthodox Tewahedo Church to be a state religion, which excluded Eritrean Muslims, leading up to the formation of the Eritrean Liberation Movement (ELM) in 1958. In 1961, those exiled Muslims established the Eritrean Liberation Front (ELF) in Cairo. Gradually, the Eritrean People's Liberation Front (EPLF) established itself as a rival of the ELF, which dissolved in 1982 during the Ethiopian Civil War. During the era, the Derg government used strategic bombing in Eritrea that caused an exodus to Sudan, Egypt, Saudi Arabia, Yemen, and other countries in the Arab world. Many were Eritrean Muslims, while Eritrean Christians, whose number increased in the 1980s, tried to claim asylum in Europe and North America.

Between approximately 20,000 and 30,000 Eritrean Muslims left the country during the British Military Administration from 1941 to 1952 and the Ethiopian-Eritrean federation from 1952 to 1962. The population increased from half a million in the 1960s to one million in the 1970s. In Sudan, 600,000 Eritreans were registered in 1994, excluding citizens living in urban areas supported by the United Nations High Commission for Refugees (UNHCR). Following Eritrean independence in 1993, under President Isaias Afwerki and the People’s Front for Democracy and Justice (PFDJ), the Eritrean population turned diasporic due to constant conflicts and civil war. Although emigration decreased in the early years of the independence struggle, a mass exodus began in 2002 shortly after the Eritrean-Ethiopian War (1998–2000).

The Eritrean diaspora may comprise as much as one third of Eritrean nationals, although exact population figures are not available for Eritrea, with one million fleeing to foreign countries during the independence struggle. In the 1970s, the EPLF formed a transnational organization to absorb Eritrean exiles in order to aid the EPLF during the civil war. One third of Eritreans live in exile because of government coercion, intimidation, and manipulation of patriotism to maintain financial flows from the diaspora through a rehabilitation tax and by delegating welfare responsibilities to its citizens abroad. Over one million Eritreans live in the Arab states and in Europe, where they do not reside as a result of political asylum, but instead work for contracts to become permanent residents. About 150,000 Eritreans are located in Saudi Arabia and the Gulf States as labor migrants, as the Arab countries support the ELF to fight against Ethiopia.

Despite the 2018 peace treaty between Eritrea and Ethiopia, which initially gave reason for optimism, these circumstances have resulted in ongoing emigration. Ongoing political repression and the continuation of indefinite national service have contributed to continued emigration from Eritrea.

== See also ==
- Demographics of Eritrea
