= Kunama languages =

Kunama
- Geographic distribution: Eritrea, Ethiopia
- Linguistic classification: Nilo-Saharan?: Maba–Kunama?; Kunama
- Subdivisions: Kunama; Bitama-Ilit

Language codes
- Glottolog: kuna1268
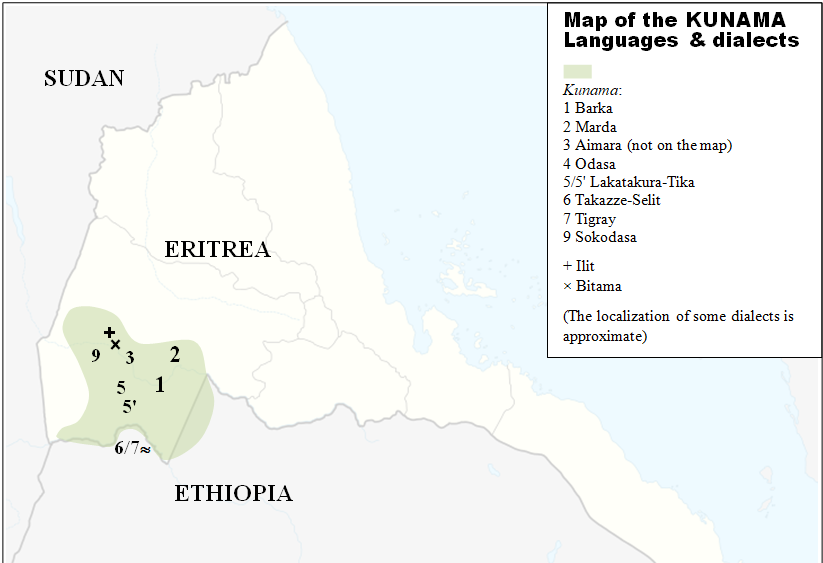

The Kunama languages are a family of languages traditionally considered dialects of a single language, spoken in western Eritrea and across the border in Ethiopia. They are included as a branch of the Nilo-Saharan language family. The languages are Kunama proper and Ilit.
