= Ilit language =

Nilo-Saharan language spoken in East Africa

Ilit
- Native to: Eritrea
- Region: Gash-Barka Region
- Ethnicity: Kunama
- Native speakers: (1,000 cited 1993)
- Language family: Nilo-Saharan?: Kunama; Ilit
- Dialects: Bitama (Bitaama); Sokodas

Language codes
- ISO 639-3: (included in Kunama [kun])
- Glottolog: ilit1242 Ilit bita1252 Bitama soko1249 Sokodasa

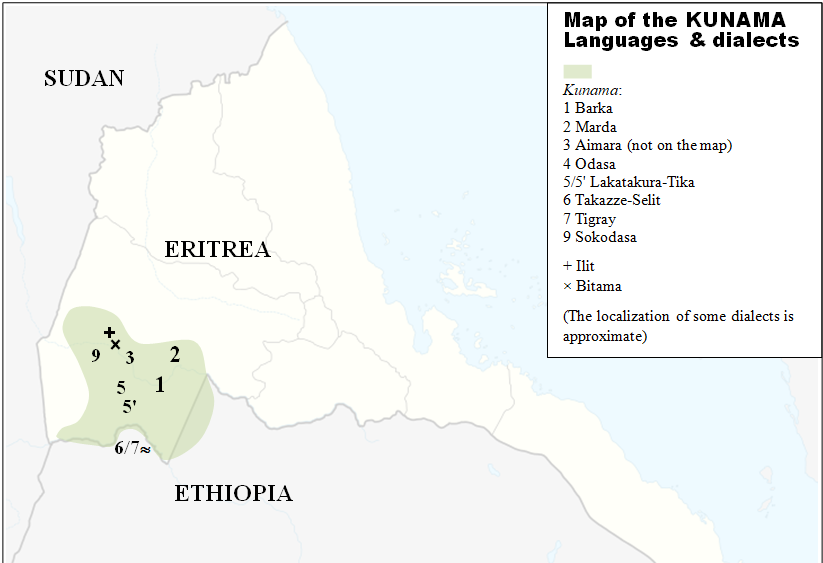
Map of the Kunama Languages

Ilit (Iiliit) is a divergent variety of Kunama that is mutually unintelligible enough to be considered a distinct language. It is spoken by the Kunama people who straddle the western Eritrean–Ethiopian border.
