= Eritrea–Germany relations =

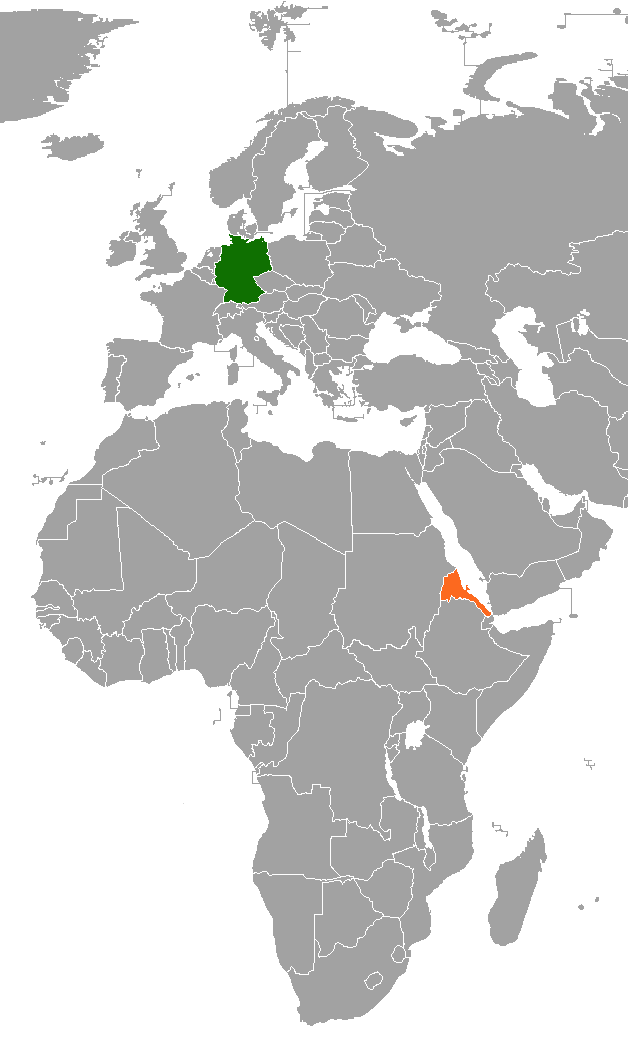

- Germany: Eritrea

Eritrea–Germany relations have existed since Eritrea's independence from Ethiopia in 1993, but they are strained by the poor human rights situation in Eritrea. Among Afro-Germans, Eritreans are now among the largest groups.

== History ==
Some German-speaking explorers such as Friedrich Gerstäcker and the Werner Munzinger traveled in Eritrea in the 19th century. In 1871, the orientalist Franz Praetorius published a treatise on the Tigrinya language. The Rose Legation, which concluded a trade and friendship treaty with the Ethiopian Empire on behalf of Kaiser Wilhelm II, reached Eritrea in May 1905. During World War II, the German Motorized Company was deployed in Eritrea as a volunteer unit in the East African campaign in Italian East Africa. However, on April 2, 1941, Britain troops captured Eritrea after the Italians were defeated at Asmara on April 1. After World War II, Eritrea was once again part of Abyssinia and later the successor state Ethiopia. As a result, a protracted war of independence ensued. In 1976 the Eritrea-Hilfswerk was founded in Germany by Germans and Eritreans. In 1993, the long war ended with Eritrea's independence from Ethiopia.

Germany recognized the country's independence and established diplomatic relations with Eritrea. The German Embassy in Asmara was established in 1995. Four years later, the Eritrean Embassy in Berlin was opened in the Pankow district. However, bilateral relations were marred by the very authoritarian style of government in Eritrea under long-time dictator Isayas Afewerki. To escape repression in the country and arbitrary and indefinite conscription into Eritrea's armed forces, hundreds of thousands of Eritreans fled abroad. In 2014 alone, over 13,000 Eritreans applied for asylum in Germany. In 2015, German media reported that for many years the Eritrean regime has been collecting a so-called "reconstruction tax" of two percent of net income from Eritreans abroad through their foreign representations, which are essential for the regime. Those who do not pay the tax no longer receive services from the Eritrean state and thus can no longer enter the country to visit relatives, for example.

In October 2022, the Federal Administrative Court ruled that applying for passports at the Eritrean embassy was "unreasonable" for nationals in Germany. Individuals would have to submit a "declaration of remorse" with a self-incrimination of a crime in order to obtain a passport.

== Economic relations ==
Economic relations between the two countries are barely developed. The bilateral trade volume in 2021 was only 4.3 million euros, which places Eritrea among the lowest in the ranking of Germany's foreign trade partners.

== Development cooperation ==
Due to Eritrea's poor human rights record and international isolation, there is no bilateral development cooperation at the state level. However, private German associations and foundations are active in the country.

== Cultural relations ==
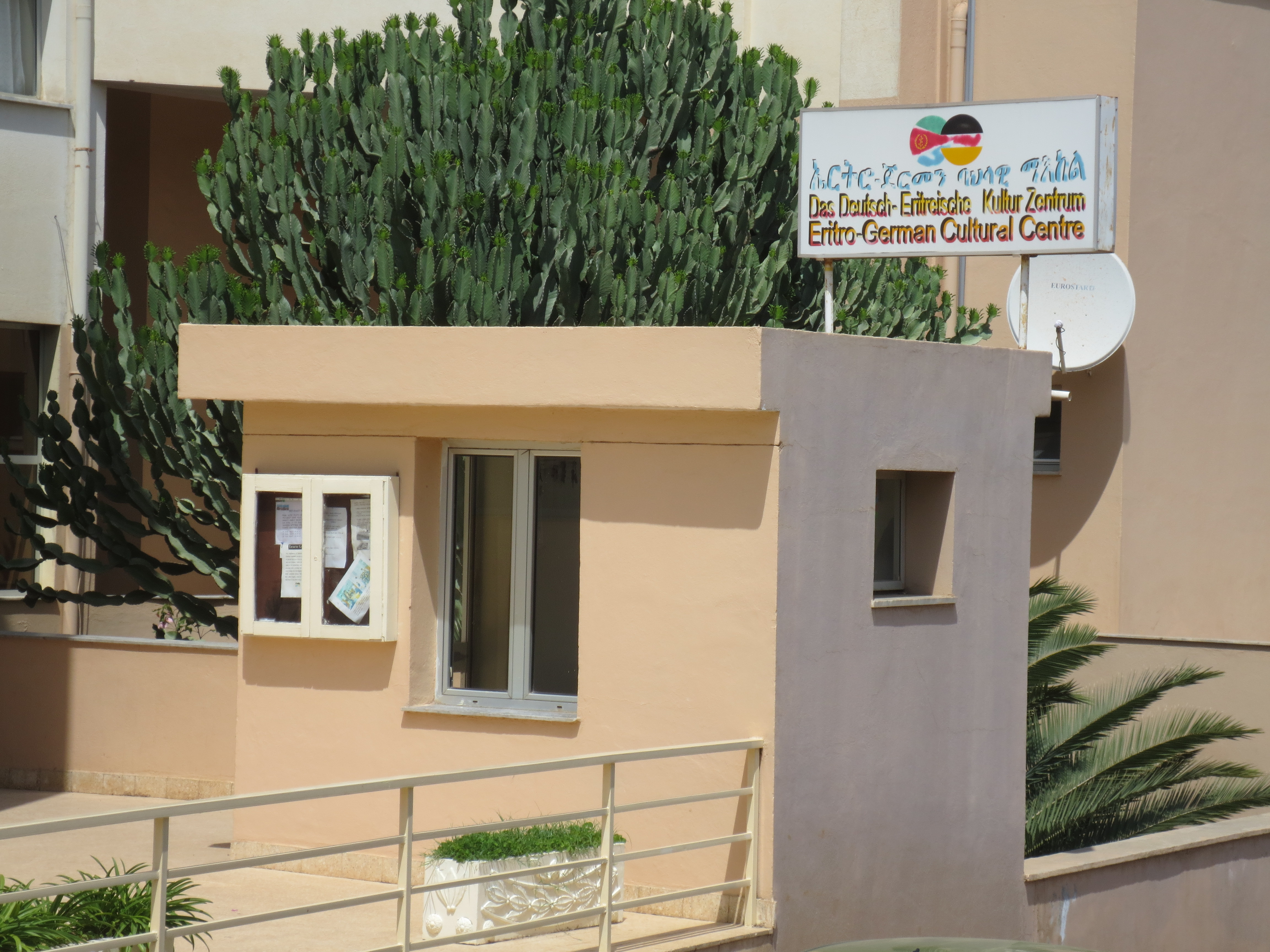
Eritrean-German Management and Cultural Center, Asmara

In Asmara, there is an Eritrean-German Management and Cultural Center with a German library. The Leipzig Philharmonic Orchestra performed in Eritrea in 2015 and 2016. In 2017, the German-Eritrean Society was founded in Frankfurt am Main, which serves to promote cultural exchange between the two countries.

== Migration ==
In 2021, just under 80,000 Eritreans lived in Germany, with a population of between five and six million in Eritrea itself. Eritreans are thus among the largest African-descended population groups in Germany. Most Eritreans came to the country as refugees after 1960, and between 2015 and 2021, Eritrean nationals were among the most common countries of origin for asylum seekers in Germany each year, with over 10,000 asylum applications per year in some cases. A particular center of the Eritrean population in Germany is the state of Hesse, especially the cities of Frankfurt am Main and Giessen. In some cases, conflicts arise within the diaspora over the political situation in the home country.

Well-known German-Eritreans include long-distance runner Eleni Gebrehiwot, actors Tedros Teclebrhan, politician Awet Tesfaiesus, musicians Afrob, Nura and football player Joel Gerezgiher.

== Diplomatic missions ==
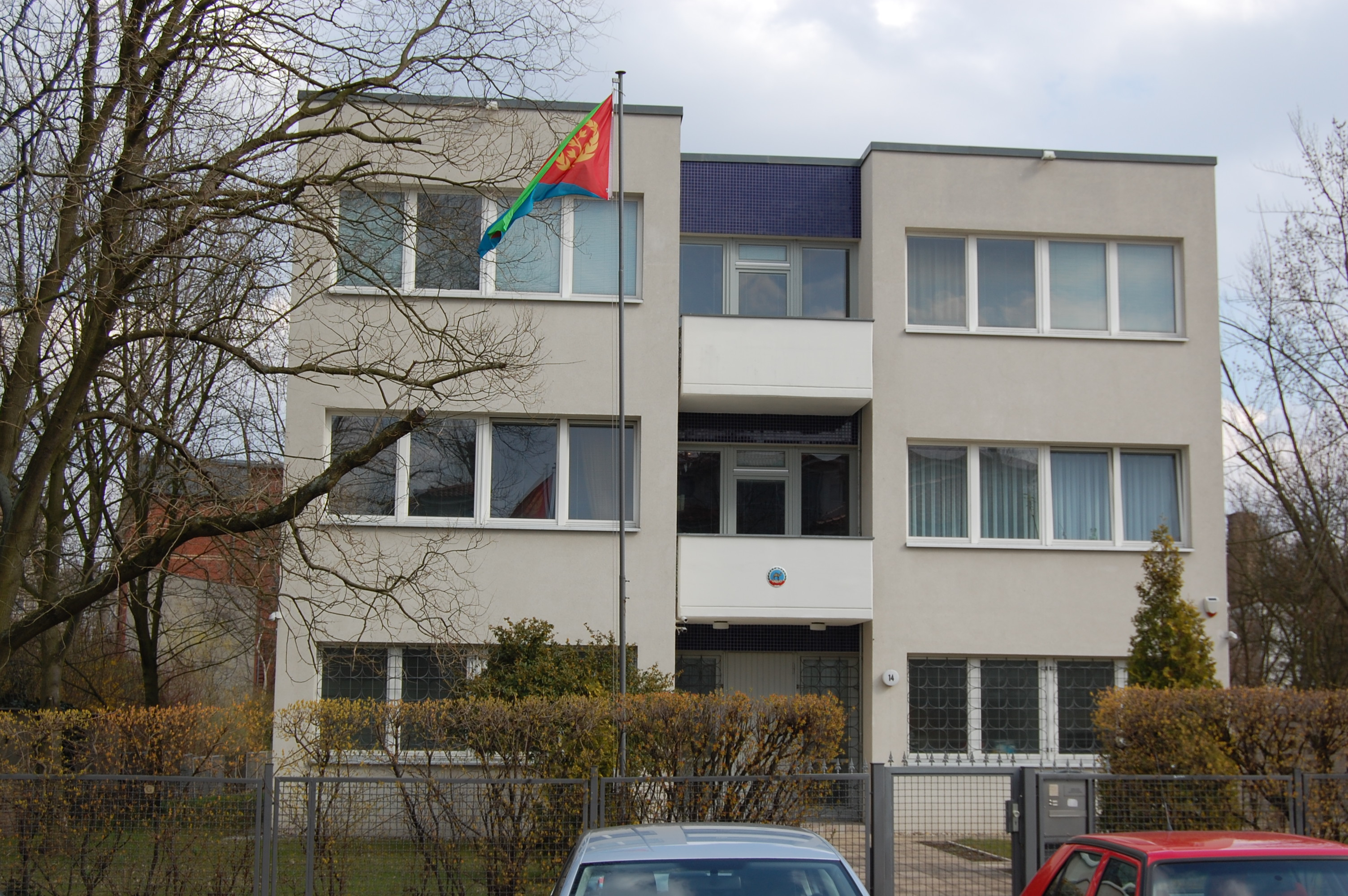
Embassy of Eritrea, Berlin

- Eritrea has an embassy in Berlin and a consulate-general in Frankfurt am Main.
- Germany has an embassy in Asmara.
