= Life insurance trust =

A life insurance trust is an irrevocable, non-amendable trust which is both the owner and beneficiary of one or more life insurance policies. Upon the death of the insured, the trustee invests the insurance proceeds and administers the trust for one or more beneficiaries. If the trust owns insurance on the life of a married person, the non-insured spouse and children are often beneficiaries of the insurance trust. If the trust owns "second to die" or survivorship insurance which only pays when both spouses are deceased, only the children would be beneficiaries of the insurance trust.

In the United States, proper ownership of life insurance is important if the insurance proceeds are to escape federal estate taxation. If the policy is owned by the insured, the proceeds will be subject to estate tax. (This assumes that the aggregate value of the estate plus the life insurance is large enough to be subject to estate taxes.) To avoid estate taxation, some insureds name a child, spouse or other beneficiary as the owner of the policy.

There are drawbacks to having insurance proceeds paid outright to a child, spouse, or other beneficiary.

- Doing so may be inconsistent with the insured's wishes or the best interests of the beneficiary, who might be a minor or lacking in financial sophistication and unable to invest the proceeds wisely.
- The insurance proceeds will be included in the beneficiary's taxable estate at his or her subsequent death. If the proceeds are used to pay the insured's estate taxes, it would at first appear that the proceeds could not be on hand to be taxed at the beneficiary's subsequent death. However, using insurance proceeds to pay the insured's estate taxes effectively increases the beneficiary's estate since the beneficiary will not have to sell inherited assets to pay such taxes.

The solution to both drawbacks is usually an irrevocable life insurance trust.

If possible, the trustee of the insurance trust should be the original applicant and owner of the insurance. If the insured transfers an existing policy to the insurance trust, the transfer will be recognized by the Internal Revenue Service only if the insured survives the date of the transfer by not less than three years. If the insured dies within this three-year period, the transfer will be ignored and the proceeds will be included in the insured's taxable estate.

Insurance trusts may be funded or nonfunded. A funded life insurance trust owns both one or more insurance contracts and income producing assets. The income from the assets is used to pay some or all of the premiums. Funded insurance trusts are not commonly used for two reasons:

- the additional gift tax cost of transferring income producing assets to the trust and
- the grantor trust rules of IRC §677(a)(3) cause the grantor to be taxed on the trust's income.

Unfunded insurance trusts own one or more insurance policies and are funded by annual gifts from the grantor.

Customarily, the trustee of the insurance trust is authorized, but not required, to either purchase assets from the insured's estate or lend insurance proceeds to his or her estate. Since the trustee of the insurance trust possesses all incidents of ownership in the insurance policy, the insurance trust provides the insured's estate with liquidity while shielding the insurance proceeds or assets purchased with the proceeds from estate tax when the insured dies, provided the trust has the appropriate settlor and trustee.

Usually, people set up insurance trusts for reasons like the following:

i) Control the distributions

ii) Payoff Liabilities

iii) Take care of themselves

iv) Ensure a minor named as a beneficiary will be able to receive the monies

v) To name substitute beneficiaries

vi) To benefit non-trust nominees
