= Languages of Eritrea =

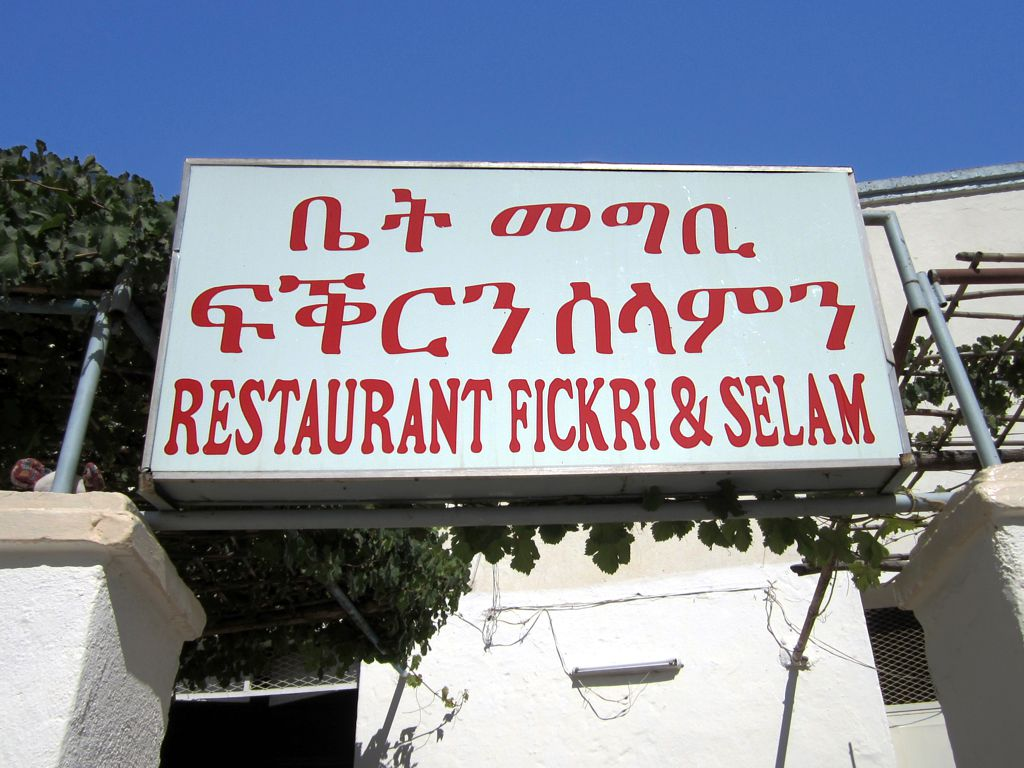
- Restaurant with sign in Tigrinya and English (Keren, Eritrea)
- Official: Tigrinya
- Recognised: Tigrinya, Tigre, Kunama, Bilen, Nara, Saho, Afar, Beja, Arabic
- Foreign: English, Italian
- Signed: Eritrean Sign Language, older sign languages
- Keyboard layout: QWERTY

The main languages spoken in Eritrea are Tigrinya, Tigre, Kunama, Bilen, Nara, Saho, Afar, and Beja. The country's working languages are Tigrinya, Arabic, English, and formerly Italian.

Tigrinya is the most widely spoken language in the country and had 2,540,000 native speakers out of the total population of 5,254,000 in 2006. The remaining residents primarily speak other languages from the Afroasiatic family, Nilo-Saharan languages or Indo-European languages.

== Ethno-linguistic demographics ==
According to linguists, the first Afroasiatic-speaking populations arrived in the region during the Neolithic period from the family's proposed urheimat ("original homeland") in the Nile Valley, or the Near East. Other scholars propose that the Afro-Asiatic family developed in situ in the Horn, with its speakers subsequently dispersing from there.

Eritrea's population now comprises nine ethnic groups, most of whom speak languages from the Semitic and Cushitic branches of the Afro-Asiatic family.

Estimates of numbers of speakers given below are from SIL Ethnologue unless otherwise noted.

=== Afro-Asiatic languages ===
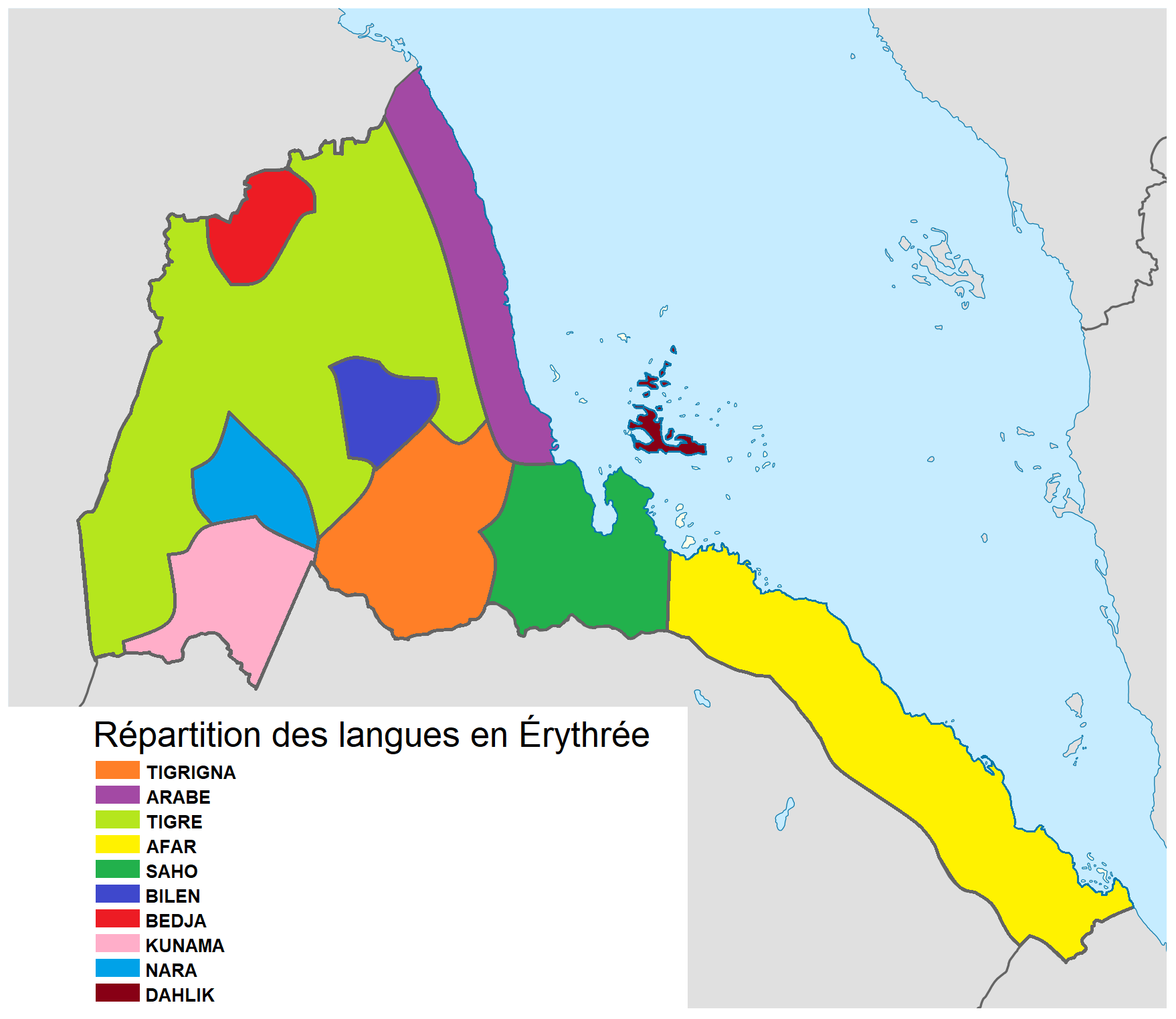
Coloured linguistic map of Eritrea (language names are in French, and so are spelled slightly differently)

The languages spoken in Eritrea are Tigrinya, Tigre, and Dahlik (formerly considered a dialect of Tigre). Together, they are spoken by around 70% of local residents:

- Tigrinya, spoken as a first language by the Tigrinya people. As of 2006, there were around 2.54 million speakers.
- Tigre, spoken by the Tigre people. As of 2006, there were around 1.05 million speakers.
- Dahlik, spoken in the Dahlak Archipelago. Variously regarded as either a divergent dialect of Tigre or a separate language, it was assigned its own ISO 639-3 code in 2013. As of 2012, there were around 2,500 speakers.

Other Afro-Asiatic languages belonging to the family's Cushitic branch are also spoken in the country. They are spoken by around 10% of residents and include:

- Beja (Bedawiyet), spoken by the Hedareb. It is sometimes classified as an independent branch of the Afro-Asiatic family. As of 2006, there were 158,000 speakers in Eritrea.
- Saho, spoken by the Saho people. It is sometimes grouped with Afar as Saho-Afar. As of 2006, there were around 191,000 speakers in Eritrea.
- Afar, spoken by the Afar people, predominantly in Ethiopia and Djibouti. As of 2006, there were fewer than 100,000 speakers in Eritrea.
- Blin or Bilen, spoken by the Bilen people in the Anseba region and Keren town area. As of 2006, there were around 91,000 speakers.

=== Nilo-Saharan languages ===
In addition, languages belonging to the Nilo-Saharan language family are spoken as a mother tongue by the Kunama and Nara Nilotic ethnic minorities that live in the west and southwestern parts of the country. Around 187,000 individuals speak the Kunama language, while around 81,400 people speak the Nara language. As of 2006, this corresponds with around 3.5% and 1.5%, respectively, of total residents.

=== Foreign languages ===
Arabic is mostly found in the form of Modern Standard Arabic as an educational language taught in primary and secondary schools, but there are native speakers of dialectal variants of Arabic, as follows:

- Sudanese Arabic; spoken by approximately 90% of Arabic speakers of Eritrea, also spoken by Sudanese Arabs. As of 2006, there were around 100,000 speakers in Eritrea.
- Hadhrami Arabic, with about 100,000 speakers as of 2006.
- Hijazi Arabic, spoken by the Rashaida. As of 2006, there were around 24,000 speakers.
- Ta'izzi-Adeni Arabic with about 18,000 speakers as of 2006.

Italian was introduced in the 19th century by the colonial authorities in Italian Eritrea but is now used in commerce at times. It serves as the mother tongue of a few Italian Eritreans, but is still understood and spoken as a "pidgin" by many old Eritreans and few of their children mainly in Asmara and Massawa.

English was introduced in the 1940s under the British military administration of Italian Eritrea. It is now used as the de facto working language.

== Official status ==
The 1997 Constitution of Eritrea does not define any official languages. It states that "the equality of all Eritrean languages is guaranteed" without providing a conclusive list of the languages in question. The CIA Factbook cites Tigrinya, Arabic and English as official languages, alongside ethnic Eritrean languages like Tigre, Afar and other Cushitic languages, as well as the Nilo-Saharan Kunama. SIL Ethnologue lists Tigrinya as the de facto language of national identity, Arabic as the de facto national language, and English as the de facto working language. The Eritrean embassy in Sweden says, "The main working languages are Tigrinya and Arabic. English is the medium of instruction from middle school level upwards."

== Writing and literacy ==
According to the Ministry of Information of Eritrea, an estimated 80% of the country's population is literate.

In terms of writing systems, Eritrea's principal orthography is Ge'ez, Latin script and Arabic script. Ge'ez is employed as an abugida for the two most spoken languages in the country: Tigrinya and Tigre. It first came into usage in the 6th and 5th centuries BC as an abjad to transcribe the Semitic Ge'ez language. Ge'ez now serves as the liturgical language of the Eritrean Orthodox and Ethiopian Orthodox Tewahedo Churches. The Latin script is used to write the majority of the country's other languages excluding Arabic. The Arabic script has also been used to write Afar, Beja, Saho and Tigre in the past. However, Tigre is mostly written in Ge'ez script now while the Latin script is used to write the other languages. For example, Qafar Feera, a modified Latin script, serves as an orthography for transcribing Afar.
