= Bilen language =

Cushitic language spoken in Eritrea

Bilen
- ብሊን (Blin)
- Native to: Eritrea
- Region: Anseba, Keren
- Ethnicity: Bilen
- Native speakers: 72,000 (2022)
- Language family: Afro-Asiatic: Cushitic; Agaw; Northern; Bilen
- Dialects: Senhit; T'aqwur
- Writing system: Geʽez script (Bilen abugida); Latin

Official status
- Recognised minority language in: Eritrea

Language codes
- ISO 639-2: byn
- ISO 639-3: byn
- Glottolog: bili1260
- ELP: Bilen
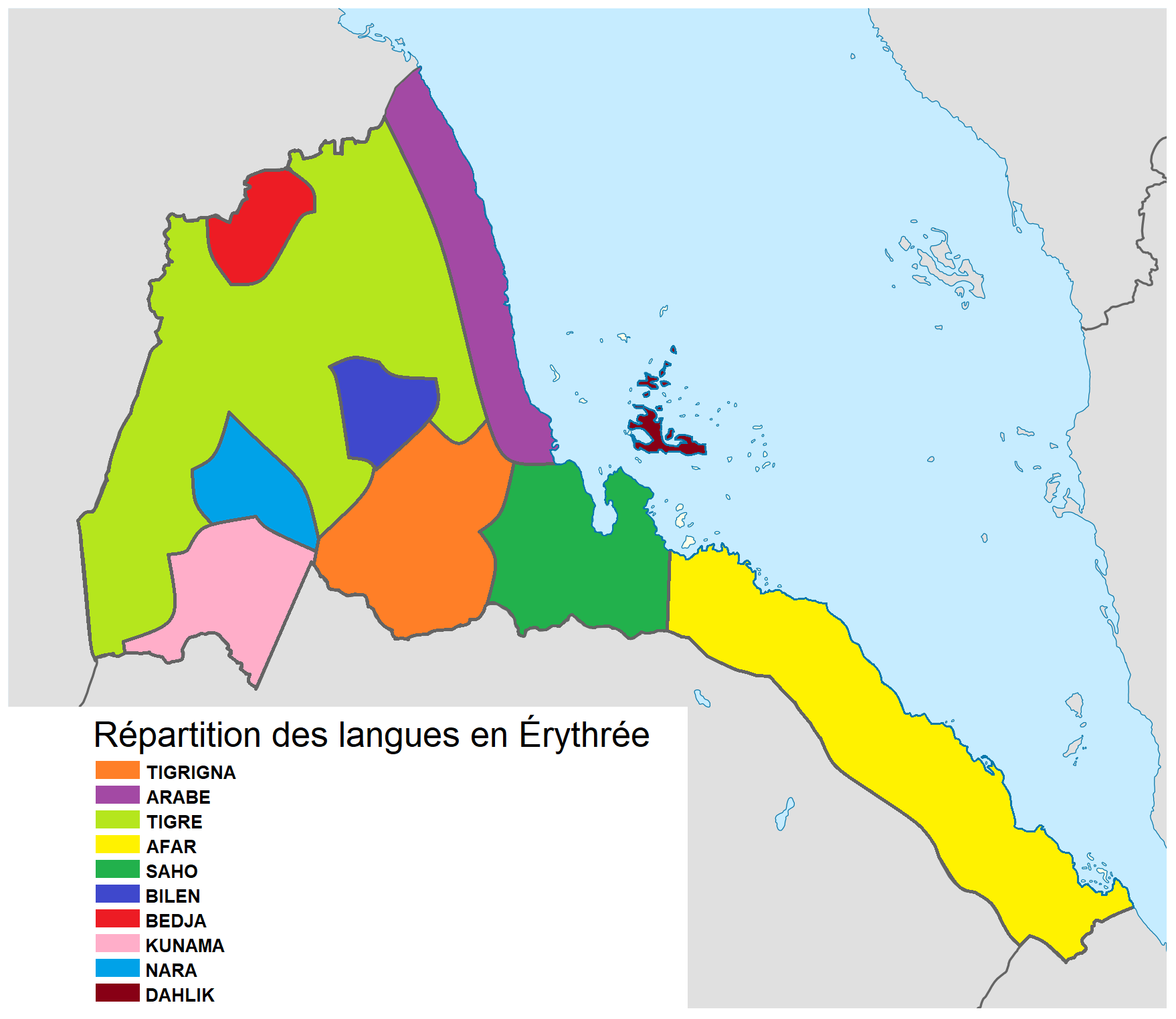
- Linguistic map of Eritrea; Bilen is spoken in the dark blue region

The Bilen language (ብሊና b(ɨ)lina or ብሊን b(ɨ)lin) is spoken by the Bilen people in and around the city of Keren in Eritrea. It is the only Agaw (Central Cushitic) language spoken in Eritrea. It is spoken by about 72,000 people.

== Spelling of the name ==
"Blin" is an English spelling often used by native speakers, but Bilin and Bilen are also commonly used. Bilin is the reference name arbitrarily used in the current initial English editions of ISO 639-3, but Blin is also listed as an equivalent name without preference. In the English list of ISO 639-2, Blin is listed in first position in both English and French lists, when Bilin is listed as an alternate name in the English list, and Bilen is the alternate name in the French list. The Ethnologue report lists Bilen as the preferred name, but also Bogo, Bogos, Bilayn, Bilin, Balen, Beleni, Belen, Bilein, Bileno, North Agaw as alternative names.

== Phonology ==
It is not clear if Bilen has tone. It may have pitch accent (Fallon 2004) as prominent syllables always have a high tone, but not all words have such a syllable.

=== Vowels ===
Vowel phonemes
	Front	Central	Back
High	i	ɨ	u
Mid	e	ə	o
Low		a	

=== Consonants ===
Note: /tʃ/ is found in loans, and the status of /ʔ/ as a phoneme is uncertain.

/r/ is typically realised as a tap when it is medial and a trill when it is in final position.

Consonant phonemes
		Labial	Alveolar	Palato- (alveolar)	Velar		Pharyn- geal	Glottal
		Labial	Alveolar	Palato- (alveolar)	plain	labialized	Pharyn- geal	Glottal
Plosive / Affricate	voiceless		t	(tʃ)	k	kʷ		(ʔ)
Plosive / Affricate	voiced	b	d	dʒ	ɡ	ɡʷ		
Plosive / Affricate	ejective		tʼ	tʃʼ	kʼ	kʷʼ		
Nasal		m	n		ŋ	ŋʷ		
Fricative	voiceless	f	s	ʃ	x	xʷ	ħ	h
Fricative	voiced		z				ʕ	
Rhotic			r					
Approximant			l	j		w		

Fallon (2001, 2004) notes intervocalic lenition, such as /b/ → [β]; syncope, as in the name of the language, /bɨlín/ → [blín]; debuccalization with secondary articulation preserved, as in /dérekʷʼa/ → [dɛ́rɛʔʷa] 'mud for bricks'. Intriguingly, the ejectives have voiced allophones, which according to Fallon (2004) "provides an important empirical precedent" for one of the more criticized aspects of the glottalic theory of Indo-European. For example,

Ejective consonant	Voiced allophone	Gloss
/laħátʃʼɨna/	[laħádʒɨna]	'to bark'
/kʼaratʃʼna/	[kʼaradʒna]	'to cut'
/kʷʼakʷʼito/	[ɡʷaʔʷito]	'he was afraid'

== Writing system ==
=== Geʽez abugida ===
A writing system for Bilen was first developed by missionaries who used the Geʽez script and the first text was published in 1882. Although the Geʽez script is usually used for Semitic languages, the phonemes of Bilen are very similar (7 vowels, labiovelar and ejective consonants). The script therefore requires only a slight modification (the addition of consonants for ŋ and ŋʷ) to make it suitable for Bilen. Some of the additional symbols required to write Bilen with this script are in the "Eritrean, Ethiopic Extended" Unicode range rather than the "Eritrean, Ethiopic" range.

Blin Eritrean, Ethiopic Characters
IPA	e	u	i	a	ie	ɨ/-	o	ʷe	ʷi	ʷa	ʷie	ʷɨ/-
h	ሀ	ሁ	ሂ	ሃ	ሄ	ህ	ሆ					
l	ለ	ሉ	ሊ	ላ	ሌ	ል	ሎ					
ħ	ሐ	ሑ	ሒ	ሓ	ሔ	ሕ	ሖ					
m	መ	ሙ	ሚ	ማ	ሜ	ም	ሞ					
s	ሰ	ሱ	ሲ	ሳ	ሴ	ስ	ሶ					
ʃ	ሸ	ሹ	ሺ	ሻ	ሼ	ሽ	ሾ					
r	ረ	ሩ	ሪ	ራ	ሬ	ር	ሮ					
kʼ	ቀ	ቁ	ቂ	ቃ	ቄ	ቅ	ቆ	ቈ	ቊ	ቋ	ቌ	ቍ
ʁ	ቐ	ቑ	ቒ	ቓ	ቔ	ቕ	ቖ	ቘ	ቚ	ቛ	ቜ	ቝ
b	በ	ቡ	ቢ	ባ	ቤ	ብ	ቦ					
t	ተ	ቱ	ቲ	ታ	ቴ	ት	ቶ					
n	ነ	ኑ	ኒ	ና	ኔ	ን	ኖ					
ʔ	አ	ኡ	ኢ	ኣ	ኤ	እ	ኦ					
k	ከ	ኩ	ኪ	ካ	ኬ	ክ	ኮ	ኰ	ኲ	ኳ	ኴ	ኵ
x	ኸ	ኹ	ኺ	ኻ	ኼ	ኽ	ኾ	ዀ	ዂ	ዃ	ዄ	ዅ
w	ወ	ዉ	ዊ	ዋ	ዌ	ው	ዎ					
ʕ	ዐ	ዑ	ዒ	ዓ	ዔ	ዕ	ዖ					
j	የ	ዩ	ዪ	ያ	ዬ	ይ	ዮ					
d	ደ	ዱ	ዲ	ዳ	ዴ	ድ	ዶ					
dʒ	ጀ	ጁ	ጂ	ጃ	ጄ	ጅ	ጆ					
ɡ	ገ	ጉ	ጊ	ጋ	ጌ	ግ	ጎ	ጐ	ጒ	ጓ	ጔ	ጕ
ŋ	ጘ	ጙ	ጚ	ጛ	ጜ	ጝ	ጞ	ⶓ	ⶔ	ጟ	ⶕ	ⶖ
tʼ	ጠ	ጡ	ጢ	ጣ	ጤ	ጥ	ጦ					
tʃʼ	ጨ	ጩ	ጪ	ጫ	ጬ	ጭ	ጮ					
f	ፈ	ፉ	ፊ	ፋ	ፌ	ፍ	ፎ					
z	ዘ	ዙ	ዚ	ዛ	ዜ	ዝ	ዞ					
ʒ	ዠ	ዡ	ዢ	ዣ	ዤ	ዥ	ዦ					
tʃ	ቸ	ቹ	ቺ	ቻ	ቼ	ች	ቾ					
ɲ	ኘ	ኙ	ኚ	ኛ	ኜ	ኝ	ኞ					
sʼ	ጸ	ጹ	ጺ	ጻ	ጼ	ጽ	ጾ					
pʼ	ጰ	ጱ	ጲ	ጳ	ጴ	ጵ	ጶ					
p	ፐ	ፑ	ፒ	ፓ	ፔ	ፕ	ፖ					
v	ቨ	ቩ	ቪ	ቫ	ቬ	ቭ	ቮ					
IPA	e	u	i	a	ie	ɨ/-	o	ʷe	ʷi	ʷa	ʷie	ʷɨ/-

=== Latin alphabet ===
In 1985 the Eritrean People's Liberation Front decided to use the Latin script for Bilen and all other non-Semitic languages in Eritrea. This was largely a political decision: the Geʽez script is associated with Christianity because of its liturgical use. The Latin alphabet is seen as being more neutral and secular. In 1993 the government set up a committee to standardize the Bilen language and the Latin-based orthography. "This overturned a 110-year tradition of writing Blin in Ethiopic script."

As of 1997, the alphabetic order was:

e, u, i, a, é, o, b, c, d, f, g, h, j, k, l, m, n, p, q, r, s, t, v, w, x, y, z, ñ, ñw, th, ch, sh, kh, kw, khw, qw, gw.

Their values are similar to the IPA apart from the following:

Letter	Value
é	ɨ
c	ʕ
j	dʒ
q	kʼ
x	ħ
y	j
ñ	ŋ
th	tʼ
ch	tʃʼ
sh	ʃ
kh	x

== See also ==
- Bilen people
