= Nara language =

Nilo-Saharan language spoken in Eritrea

Nara
- Nara-Bana
- Native to: Eritrea
- Region: Gash-Barka
- Ethnicity: Nara
- Native speakers: 73,000 (2022)
- Language family: Nilo-Saharan?: Eastern Sudanic; Northern Eastern; Nara
- Dialects: Higir; Koyta; Santora; Mogoreeb
- Writing system: Latin

Official status
- Recognised minority language in: Eritrea

Language codes
- ISO 639-3: nrb
- Glottolog: nara1262
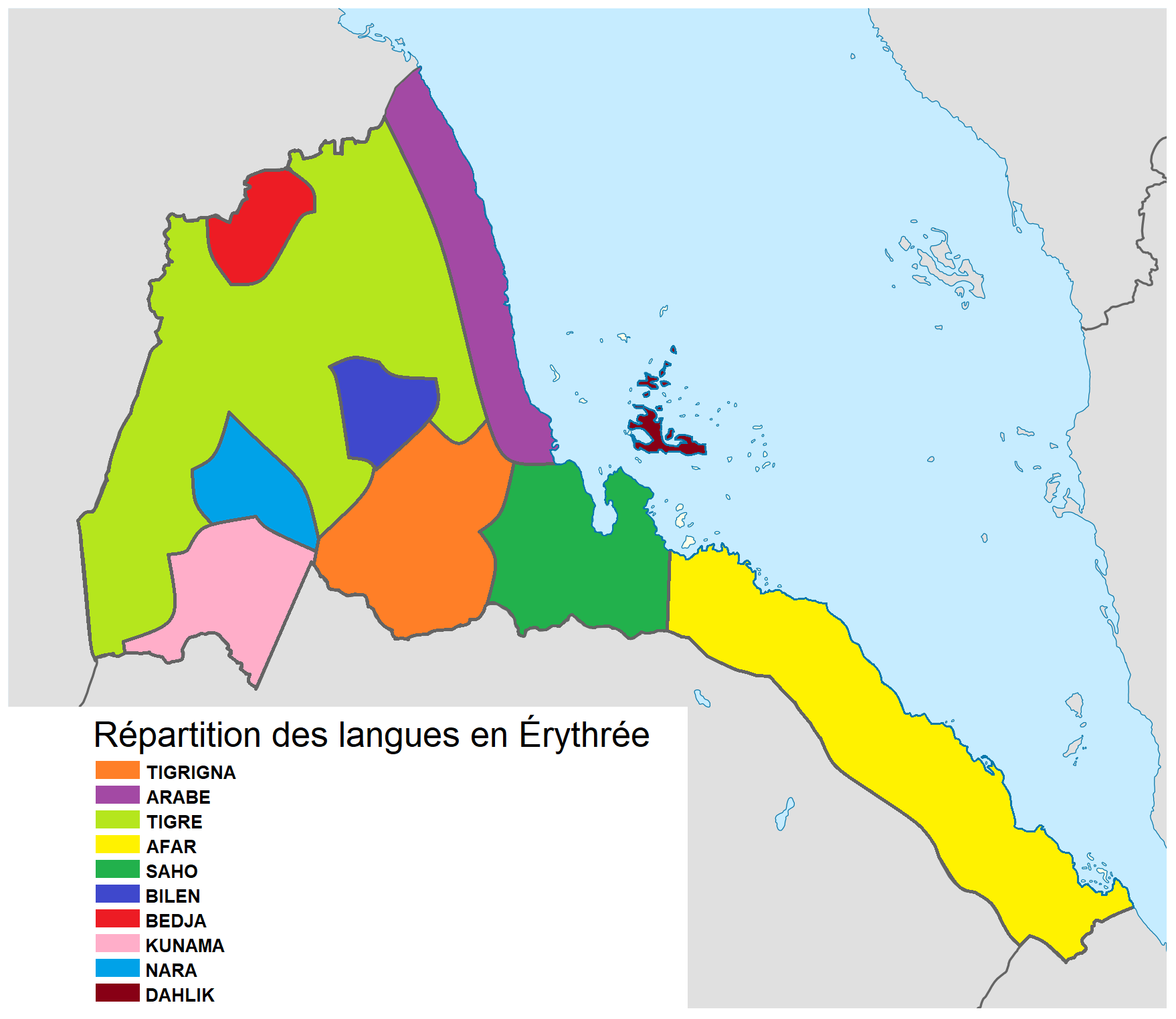
- Linguistic map of Eritrea; Nara is spoken in the sea-blue region in the west

The Nara (Nera) or Nar Kush Nubians of Egypt language is spoken by the Nara people in an area just to the north of Western Eritrea, eastern Sudan, and in the Gash-Barka Region of western Eritrea. The language is often confused with Kunama, which is at best only distantly related.

The endangerment status of Nara is unclear. According to Glottolog it is not endangered, but according to Tsige Hailemichael, the "...Nara language is in danger of quickly disappearing."

Nara has been classified as Northern Eastern Sudanic by Rilly (2009:2), but Glottolog considers the evidence unpersuasive and classifies Nara as an isolate.

== Dialects ==
There are four Nara dialects according to Rilly (2010:178):

- Higir, the standard literary dialect spoken just to the north of Barentu, Eritrea
- Mogoreeb, spoken from the outskirts of Haykota to Bisha village in western Eritrea
- Saantoorta, spoken to the west of Barentu, Eritrea
- Koyta, spoken to the northeast of Barentu, Eritrea

Higir and Mogoreeb are the larger tribes, while Saantoorta and Koyta are smaller tribes (Rilly 2010:178).

== Phonology ==
=== Consonants ===
		Labial	Alveolar	Palatal	Velar		Glottal
		Labial	Alveolar	Palatal	plain	lab.	Glottal
Stop	voiceless		t		k	kʷ	
Stop	voiced	b	d	dʒ	g	ɡʷ	
Stop	prenasal	ᵐb	ⁿd		ᵑɡ	ᵑɡʷ	
Fricative		f	s	ʃ			h
Nasal		m	n		ŋ		
Lateral			l				
Rhotic			r				
Approximant				j		w	

- Other sounds such as [z, c, kʼ, x, ʔ] occur from Tigre and Arabic.

=== Vowels ===
	Front	Central	Back
Close	i iː		u uː
Mid	e eː		o oː
Open		a aː	
