= Kunama language =

Nilo-Saharan language family spoken in Eritrea and Ethiopia

Kunama
- Baada, Baazayn, Diila
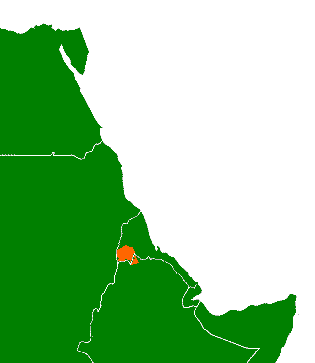
- Native to: Eritrea, Ethiopia
- Region: western Eritrea, northern Ethiopia
- Ethnicity: Kunama
- Native speakers: 180,000 (2022)
- Language family: Nilo-Saharan?: Kunama; Kunama
- Dialects: Barka (Berka); Marda; Aymasa; Tika (Lakatakura-Tika); Sokodasa; Takazze-Setit; Tigray
- Writing system: Latin

Official status
- Recognised minority language in: Eritrea

Language codes
- ISO 639-3: kun
- Glottolog: kuna1268

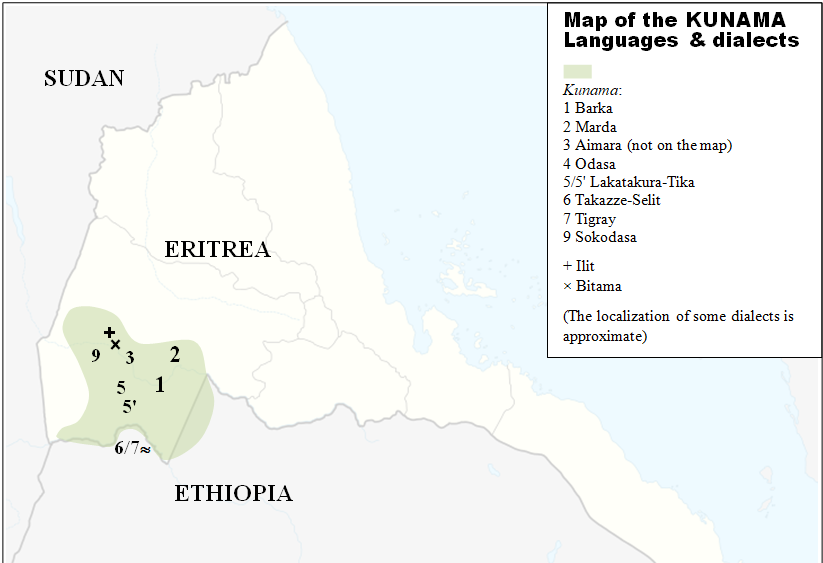
Map of Kunama languages

The Kunama language is spoken by the Kunama people of the Gash-Barka Region in western Eritrea and just across the Ethiopian border. It is a member of the Kunama language family, which is included as part of the proposed wider Nilo-Saharan language family, though it is distantly related to the other languages, if at all. The language has several dialects including: Barka, Marda, Aimara, Odasa, Tika, Lakatakura, Sokodasa, Takazze-Setit and Tigray. Ilit and Bitama are not mutually intelligible and so may be considered distinct languages.

In 1985, the Eritrean People's Liberation Front decided to use the Latin script for all non-Semitic languages in Eritrea, including Kunama. Kunama has been used in some publications, including in a translation of the Gospel of Mark first published in 1906.

== Phonology ==
=== Consonants ===
		Labial	Alveolar	Palatal	Velar	Glottal
Stop	voiceless		t	tʃ	k	
Stop	voiced	b	d	dʒ	g	
Fricative		f	s	ʃ		(h)
Nasal		m	n	ɲ	ŋ	
Rhotic			r			
Lateral			l			
Approximant		w		j		

- /h/ is only of marginal status.
- /k, ɡ/ are labialized as [kʷ, ɡʷ] after back vowels.
- /k/ is heard as aspirated [kʰ] in syllable-initial position.

=== Vowels ===
	Front	Central	Back
Close	i iː	(ɨ)	u uː
Mid	e eː	(ə)	o oː
Open		a aː	

- /i, e/ can be heard as [ɨ, ə] when in unstressed syllable position.

== See also ==
- Kunama word list (Wiktionary)

== Relevant literature ==
- Bender, M. Lionel (1996). Kunama. Languages of the World/Materials. Vol. 59. München: Lincom Europa. ISBN 978-3-89586-072-0.
- Bender, Marvin Lionel (2001). "English-Kunama lexicon". Afrikanistische Arbeitspapiere. 65: 201–253.
- Idris, Nikodimos (1987). The Kunama and their language (BA thesis). Addis Ababa University.
- Thompson, E. D. (1983). "Kunama: phonology and noun phrase". In Bender, M. L. (ed.). Nilo-Saharan Language Studies. East Lansing: African Studies Center, Michigan State University. pp. 280–322.
- Thompson, E. David (1989). "Kunama Verb Phrase". In Bender, M. Lionel (ed.). Topics in Nilo-Saharan Linguistics. Hamburg: Helmut Buske. pp. 305–346.
- Tucker, A. N.; Bryan, M. A., eds. (1966). "Kunama". Linguistic Analyses: the Non-Bantu Languages of North-Eastern Africa. London: Routledge. doi:10.4324/9781315104645. ISBN 978-1-315-10464-5.
