= List of conflicts in Eritrea =

Map showing the present-day location of the State of Eritrea within East Africa.

This is a list of conflicts in Eritrea arranged chronologically from the early modern period to the present day. This list includes: colonial wars, wars of independence, revolutions, civil wars, riots, massacres, terrorist attacks, and any battles that occurred within the territory of what is today known as the, "State of Eritrea" but were themselves only part of a theater of a world war.

== Early modern period ==
=== Ottoman Eyalet of Jeddah and Habesh ===
- 1557–1624 Ottoman conquest of Habesh

== Late modern period ==
=== Italian Eritrea ===
- 1895–1896 First Italo-Ethiopia War
  - 13 January 1895 Battle of Coatit

== Contemporary history ==
=== Italian Eritrea ===
- 3 October 1935 – May 1936 Second Italo-Abyssinian War
  - 3 October 1935 – December 1935 De Bono's invasion of Abyssinia

=== Italian East Africa ===
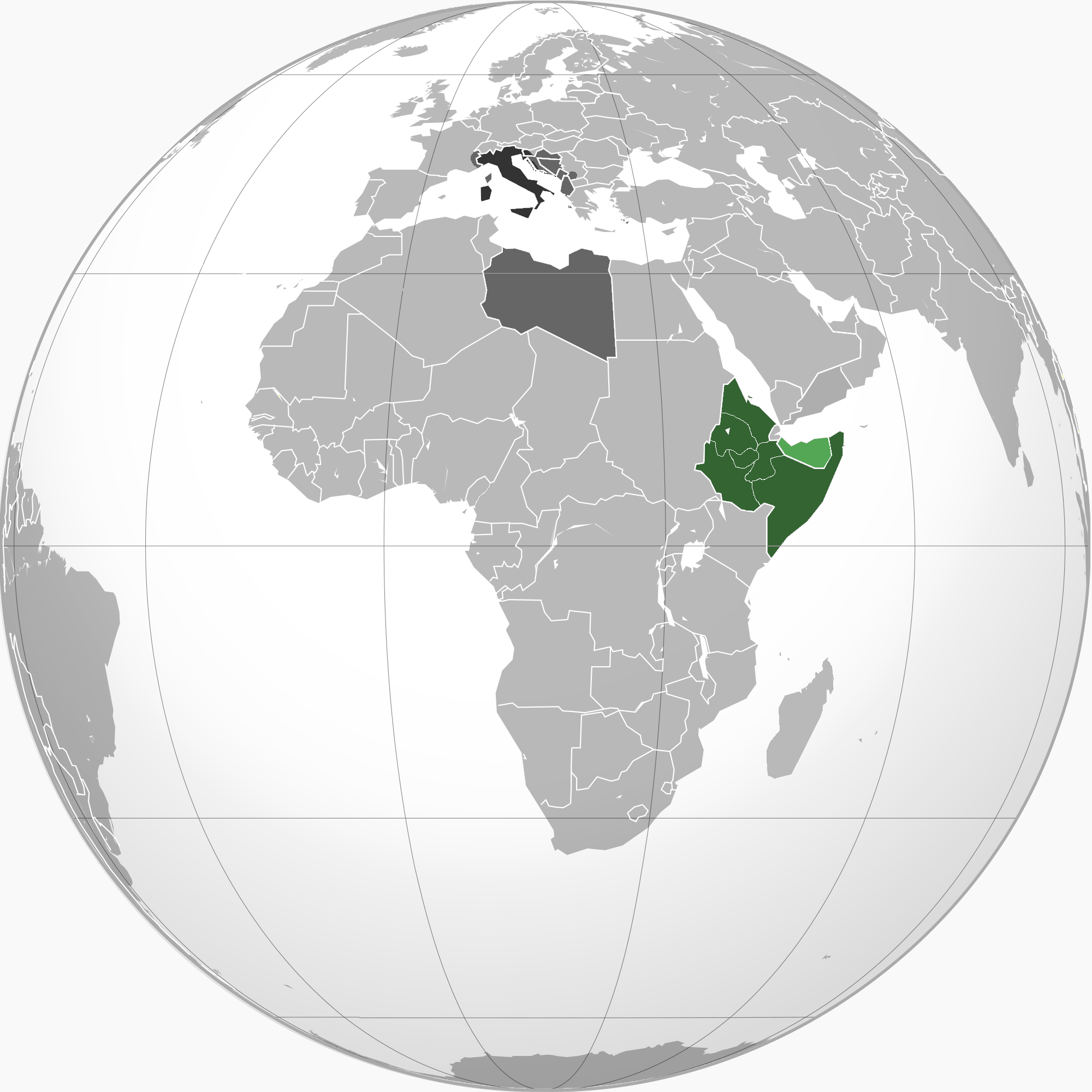
Map showing Italian East Africa in 1936. Italian East Africa Conquered in 1940 Possessions and occupied territories Kingdom of Italy

- 10 June 1940 – 27 November 1941 World War II
  - 10 June 1940 – 2 May 1945 Mediterranean and Middle East theatre
    - 10 June 1940 – 27 November 1941 East African Campaign
      - 5 February 1941 – 1 April 1941 Battle of Keren

=== Federation of Ethiopia and Eritrea ===
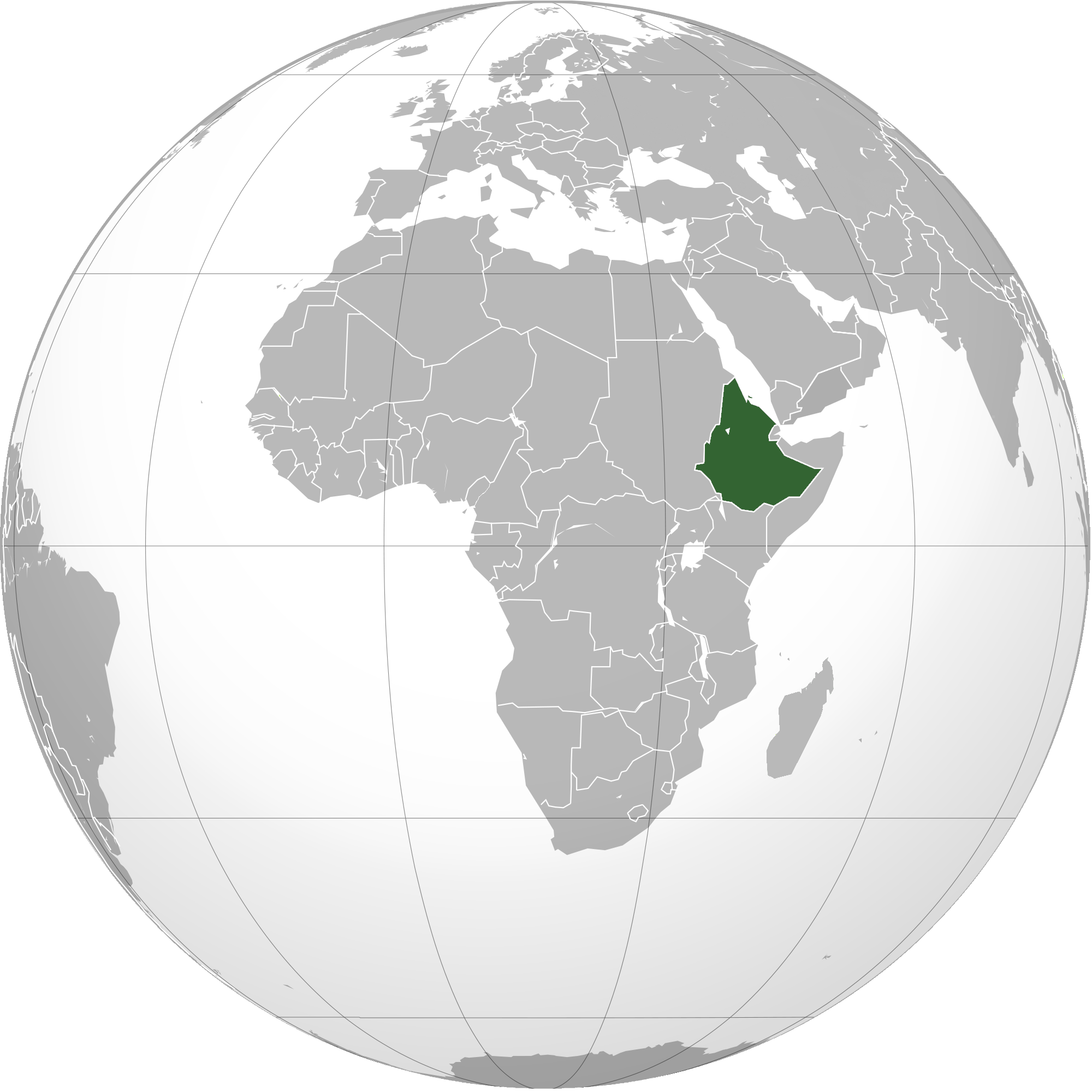
Location of the Federation of Ethiopia and Eritrea in the Horn of Africa.

- 1 September 1961 – 29 May 1991 Eritrean War of Independence
  - 24 July 1967 – One-hundred-seventy-two men had been killed in Hazemo.
  - 1967 – Fifty students suspected of being members of the Eritrean Liberation Front (ELF) had been hanged in the center of the town of Agordat.
  - 17 January 1970 – Sixty village elders in Elabared had been rounded up for supporting the Eritrean Liberation Front and killed.
  - 30 November 1970 – One-hundred-twenty people in Basik Dera had been rounded up into the local mosque and the mosque's doors had been locked, the building had then been razed and the survivors shot.
  - 1 December 1970 – Ethiopian Army units had surrounded and killed six-hundred-twenty-five people in Ona, then burnt down the village.
  - 28 December 1974 – Forty-five students in Asmara had been strangled to death using piano wires, their bodies dumped in alleyways and doorsteps.
  - 2 February 1975 – During an engagement against both the EPLF and ELF, the Ethiopian Army had attacked the church where eighty to one-hundred-three villagers in Woki Duba had taken refuge.
  - 14 February 1975 – Shortly after an EPLF attack on two Ethiopian divisions, Ethiopian troops had fired upon and killed somewhere between three-hundred-thirty-one to three-thousand civilians who had been gathered in churches, homes and schools of Asmara and other nearby villages.
  - 9 March 1975 – After several ELF attacks on the town, the Ethiopian Army had retaliated on the local population by killing two-hundred-eight in Agordat.
  - August 1975 – Two-hundred-fifty villagers in Om Hajer had been machine gunned in front of a river to prevent escape.
  - April 1988 – Three killed by aerial attacks in Agordat.
  - 5 December 1988 – Four-hundred had been killed in She'eb who had been mostly women and children.
  - 3 April 1990 – 4 April 1990 – Aerial attacks in Afabet had killed sixty-seven and wounded one-hundred-twenty-five.
  - 24 April 1990 – Aerial attacks and cluster bombs in Massawa had killed fifty and wounded one-hundred-ten.
  - 1977–1978 Battle of Massawa
  - 1977 – Siege of Barentu
  - 17 March 1988 – 20 March 1988 Battle of Afabet
  - 8 February 1990 – 10 February 1990 Battle of Massawa

=== Ethiopian Empire ===
- February 1972 – 13 October 1974 First Eritrean Civil War

=== Provisional Military Government of Socialist Ethiopia ===
- February 1980 – 24 March 1981 Second Eritrean Civil War

=== Transitional Government of Ethiopia ===
- 15 December 1995 – 17 December 1995 Hanish Islands conflict

=== State of Eritrea ===
- 6 May 1998 – 25 May 2000 Eritrean-Ethiopian War
- 10 June 2008 – 13 June 2008 Djiboutian–Eritrean border conflict
- 1 January 2010 Eritrean–Ethiopian border skirmish

== See also ==
- List of wars involving Eritrea
- Eritrean Defence Forces
- Eritrean Army
- Eritrean Air Force
- Eritrean Navy
- Military history of Africa
- African military systems to 1800 CE
- African military systems 1800 CE — 1900 CE
- African military systems after 1900 CE
