= Battle of Omal =

1961 battle of the Eritrean War of Independence

- Part of Eritrean War of Independence
Date	14 September 1961
Location	Omal, Ethiopia
Result	ELF victory

Belligerents
Ethiopian Empire	Eritrean Liberation Front

Commanders and leaders
Unknown	Hamid Idris Awate

Strength
Unknown	Unknown

Casualties and losses
Unknown	1 killed

The Battle of Omal was the second battle in the Eritrean War of Independence, and took place on 14 September 1961. In the battle, Ethiopian police units attempted to avenge the defeat in the Battle of Adal, but after a fierce battle they retreated. The Battle of Omal was the first battle where the ELF lost a soldier, Mohammed Fayd.
