= List of massacres during the Eritrean War of Independence =

The Eritrean War of Independence was fought as a guerrilla campaign by two main Eritrean liberation fronts, first by the Eritrean Liberation Front (ELF) and then, after the Eritrean Civil Wars, by the Eritrean People's Liberation Front (EPLF) against the Ethiopian Empire, and later the Marxist Derg regime. This asymmetrical campaign against Ethiopian control left the Ethiopian military at a disadvantage and so it embarked on a policy of destroying Eritrean villages. It was hoped that this would prevent the separatists from continuing their campaign. Listed below are some of the major civilian massacres committed by both the Ethiopian Empire and the Derg.

== List ==
Date	Deaths	Location	Description of event
1967-07-24	172	Hazemo	Several villages wiped out and the throats of men slit in front of their wives and children.
Late 1967	Approx 50	Akordat	Students suspected of being members of the ELF were hanged in the centre of town. Parents of the slain were forced, by the Ethiopian Army, to unhang their dead children and take them home.
6 August 1970		Missian	Ethiopian Army entered the village killing all civilians men and burning down the village totally.
1970-01-17	60	Elabared	The village elders were rounded up for supporting the Eritrean Liberation Front and killed.
1970-11-30	120	Besikdira	The entire village was rounded up into the local mosque and the mosque's doors were locked, the building was then razed and survivors were shot.
1970-12-01	800+	Ona	Ethiopian Army units surrounded the village killing civilians and burning down the village.
1974-07-10	170+	Om Hajer	
1974-12-28	45	Asmara	Students were strangled to death using piano strings, their bodies were dumped in alleyways and doorsteps.
1971	Approx 70	Keren	Students and youth suspected of supporting the ELF were publicly executed by hanging. Family members were forced to attend the execution and cut down their children from the noose.
1975-02-14	3000	Asmara, Surrounding villages	Shortly after an EPLF attack on two Ethiopian divisions, Ethiopian troops fire upon civilians gathered in Churches, homes and schools.
1975-02-02	80-103	Wekiduba	During an engagement with the EPLF and ELF the Ethiopian Army attacked the church where villagers had taken refuge. The massacre is known is Eritrea as Black Saturday.
1975-03-09	258	Agordat	After several ELF attacks on the town the Ethiopian Army retaliated on the local population.
1975-04-17	235-470	Hirgigo	
August 1975	~250	Om Hajer	The villagers were machine gunned in front of a river to prevent escape.
1976-12-30	105	Hirgigo	
1985-10-19	39	Mogoraib	
April 1988	3	Agordat	Killed by aerial attacks.50 ELF Martyr Eritrea
1988-05-04	unknown	Shebah	
1988-12-05	400+	She'eb	The dead were mostly women and children as the men had moved to the towns to eke out a living for their impoverished village.
3–4 April 1990	67 killed, 125 wounded	Afabet	Aerial attacks
24 April 1990	50 killed, 110 wounded	Massawa	Aerial attacks, cluster bombs Throughout the conflict Ethiopia used "anti-personnel gas"

== See also ==
- Eritrean War of Independence
