= List of wars involving Eritrea =

This is a list of wars involving the State of Eritrea.

== Colonial period ==
- Mahdist War (1881–1899), spilled into Eritrea in 1893–94
- Italo-Ethiopian War (1887–1889)
- First Italo-Ethiopian War (1895–96)
- Italo-Turkish War (1911–12)
- Second Italo-Ethiopian War (1935–36)
- World War II

- East African campaign (1940–41)

== Since 1950 ==
Conflict	Combatant 1	Combatant 2	Result	President of Eritrea	Eritrean losses
Eritrean War of Independence (1961–1991)	ELF (1961–1981) Supported by: Sudan; Libya; China (until 1972); Cuba (until 1975); Syria; Iraq; Saudi Arabia; Somalia; EPLF (since 1973) (Tigray Region) TPLF (since 1975) Supported by: Libya; Sudan; Somalia; Syria; Iraq; Kuwait; United Arab Emirates	1961–1974; Ethiopian Empire Supported by: United States; Israel; 1974–1991; Derg (1974–1987); PDR Ethiopia (1987–1991) Supported by: Soviet Union (1974–1990); Cuba (1974–1990); South Yemen (1974–1990); Israel; North Korea	EPLF victory: Eritrean insurgency begins in 1961; ELF defeated by EPLF and TPLF during the Eritrean Civil Wars; Fall of the Derg regime; Eritrea gains de facto independence from Ethiopia in 1991 under EPLF rule, and de jure independence after the referendum held in 1993 under UN auspices; Ethiopia becomes a landlocked country.	None	150,000
Hanish Islands Crisis (1995)	Eritrea	Yemen	Victory: Eritrean occupation of Greater Hanish	Isaias Afwerki	12
Second Sudanese Civil War (1996–1998)	(South Sudan) SPLA; Ethiopia; Eritrea; Uganda	Sudan; Janjaweed	Stalemate: Eritrean withdrawal in 1998	Isaias Afwerki	?
First Congo War (1996–1997)	(Democratic Republic of the Congo) AFDL; Rwanda; Uganda; Burundi; Angola (South Sudan) SPLA; Eritrea; Supported by: South Africa; Zambia; Zimbabwe; Ethiopia; Tanzania; United States (covertly) Mai-Mai (Note: Many Mai-Mai militias in eastern Zaire initially allied themselves with Rwanda and the AFDL against Hutu militants and refugees. As soon as most Hutu were driven away, however, many Mai-Mai groups turned against Rwanda and the AFDL. Despite this, some anti-Hutu Mai-Mai remained allied with Rwanda and the AFDL.)	Zaire: FAZ; White Legion; Sudan; Chad (Rwanda) Ex-FAR/ALiR; Interahamwe; CNDD-FDD; UNITA; ADF; FLNC; Supported by: France; Central African Republic; China; Israel; Kuwait (denied) Mai-Mai	Victory: Overthrow of the Mobutu regime; Zaire renamed back to the Democratic Republic of the Congo; Installation of Laurent-Désiré Kabila as president; Beginning of Second Congo War	Isaias Afwerki	?
Eritrean–Ethiopian War (1998–2000)	Eritrea	Ethiopia	Defeat: Algiers Agreement	Isaias Afwerki	20,000 to 150,000
Djiboutian–Eritrean conflict (2008)	Eritrea	Djibouti	Indecisive: Fighting subsided after three days	Isaias Afwerki	100
Tigray War (2020–2022)	Ethiopia; Eritrea	Tigray; OLA (2021–22)	Victory: Ethiopia–Tigray peace agreement; The government and the TPLF formally agreed to a cessation of hostilities and systematic, verifiable disarmament (2 November 2022); Second agreement for implementing the peace deal signed by both parties (12 November 2022); Federal authority in the Tigray Region is reestablished; Interim Regional Administration of Tigray formed on 23 March 2023; Continued Eritrean military presence in Tigray as of 2023; Status of Tigray Region's Western Zone still disputed	Isaias Afwerki	?

== See also ==
- Second Afar insurgency
- 2013 Eritrean Army mutiny

== Sources ==
- Prunier, Gérard (2009). Africa's World War: Congo, the Rwandan Genocide, and the Making of a Continental Catastrophe. Oxford: Oxford University Press. ISBN 978-0-19-970583-2.
- Reyntjens, Filip (2009). The Great African War: Congo and Regional Geopolitics, 1996-2006. Cambridge University Press. ISBN 978-0-521-11128-7.
