= Besikdira =

Besikdira (also cited in various publications as Besigdira, Besikdira, Besikdera, Basik Dera) is a village in the Anseba region of Eritrea. Located in north-eastern region of the country, the village is 15 km East of Eritrea, closest to the town of Keren.

Besikdira comprises two Bilen words, beska (a sisal plant used for rope) and dira (a baobab tree).

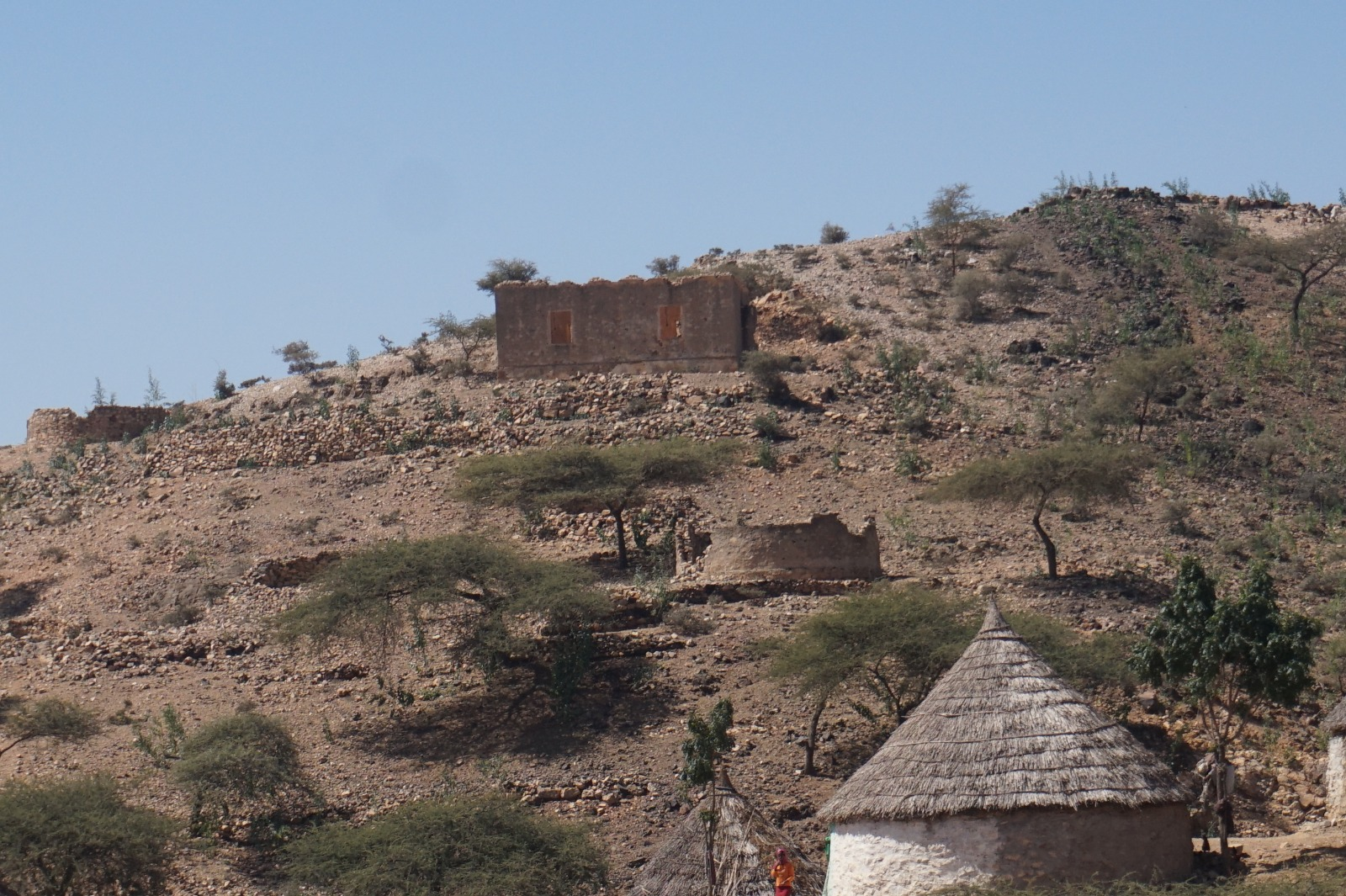

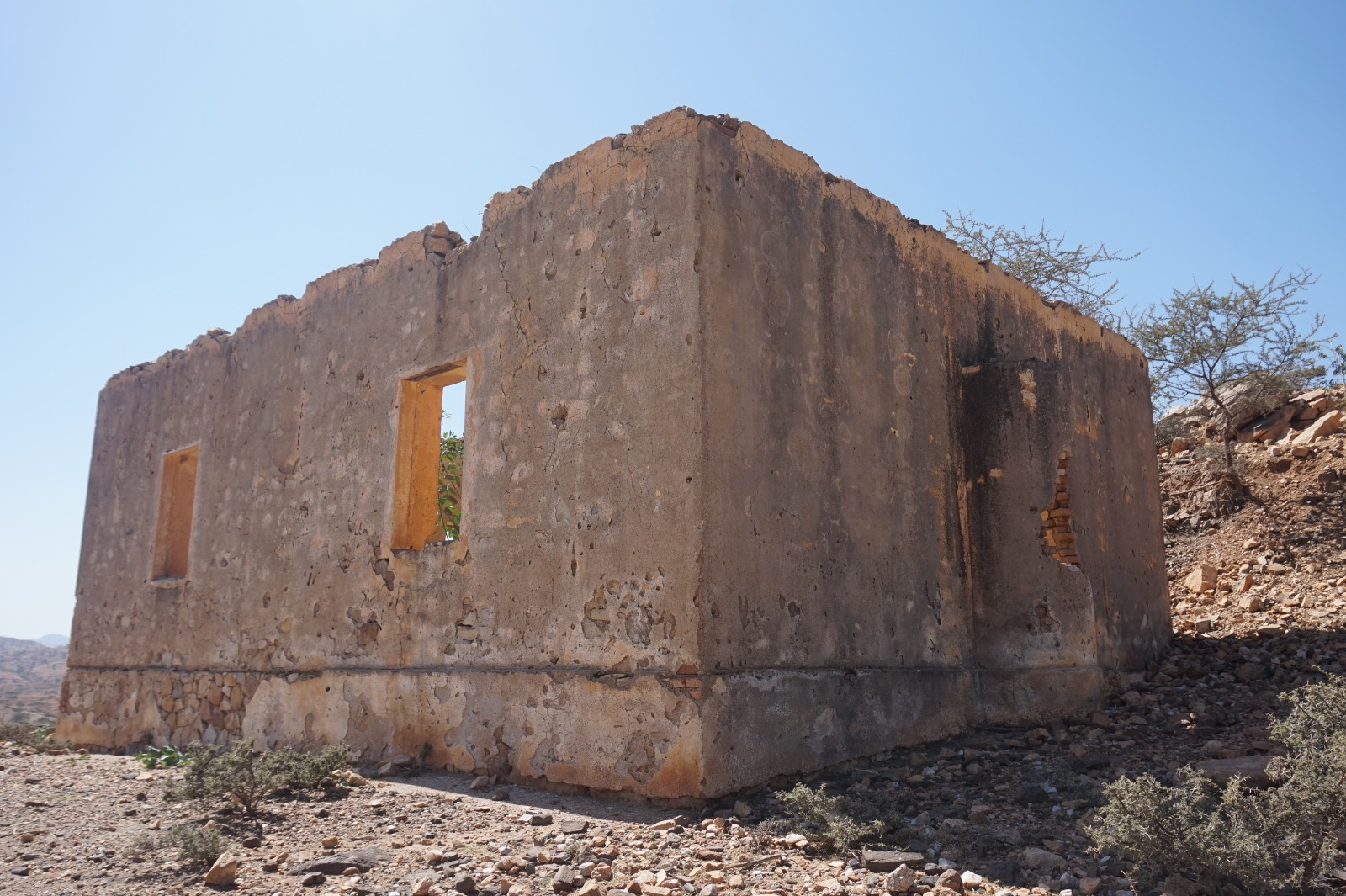

== Massacre ==
During the Eritrean War of Independence, many were killed in raids in Eritrea, including the village of Besikdira.

On November 30, 1970, approximately 122 inhabitants of the village were killed, whereas other reports claim 200 civilians were killed.

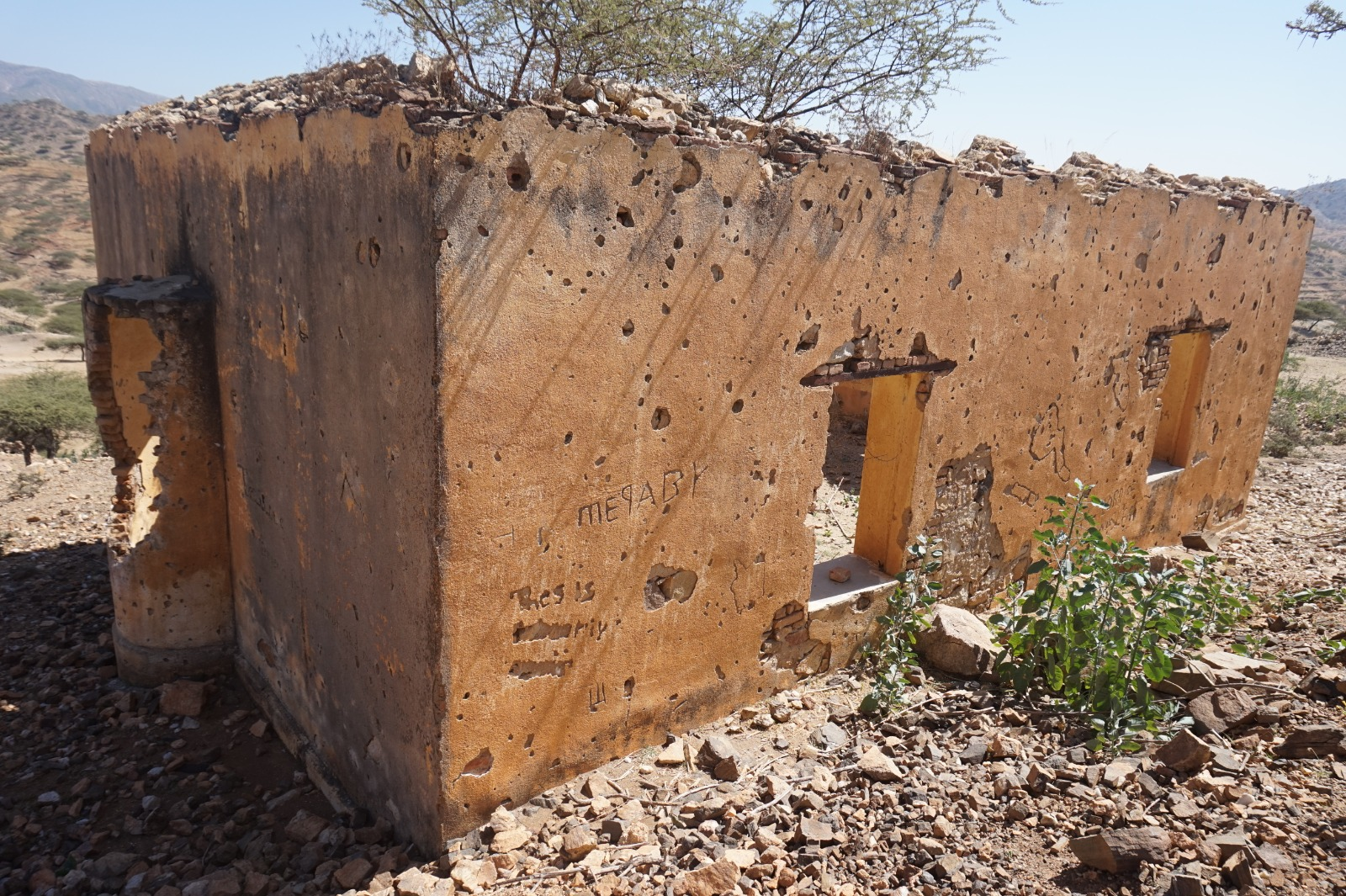

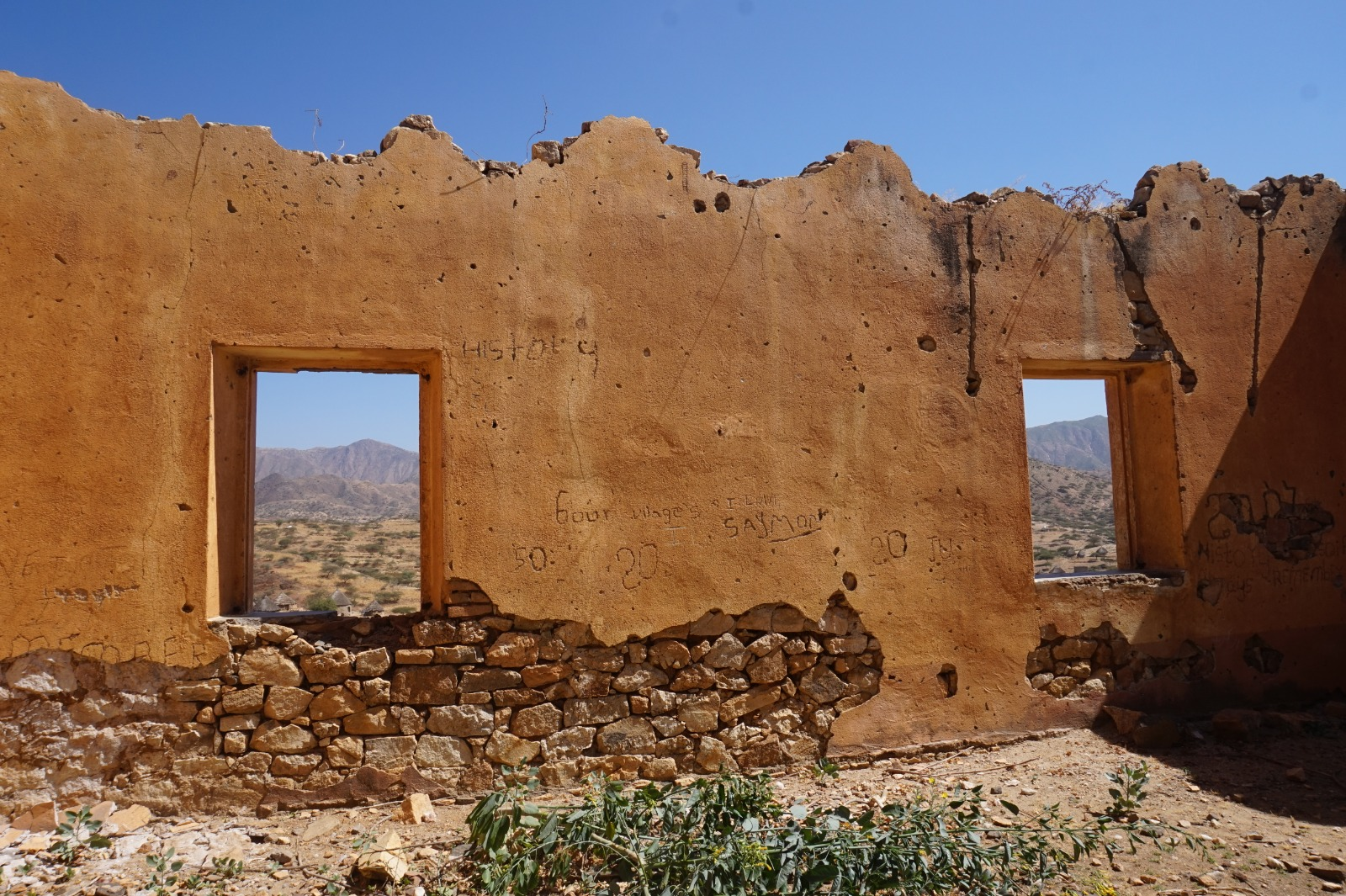
Inside view of mosque in Besikdira

== Further massacres ==
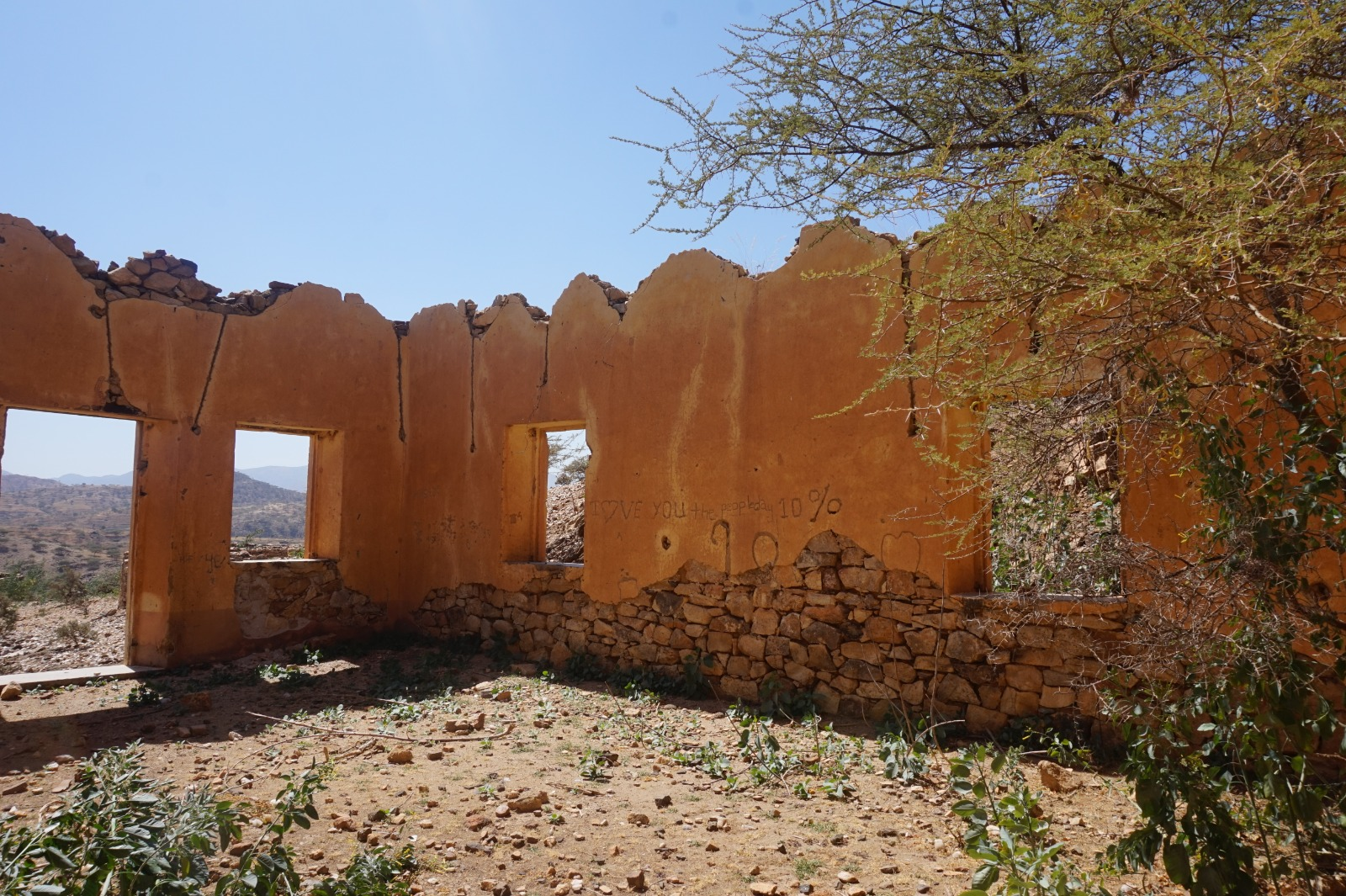
Inside view of the mosque where the massacre took place

This was the first in a series of massacres to take place during the war of Independence. Further massacres took place in both the Ona village in December 1970, Hirgigo in 1975 and She’eb in December 1988. A complete list of massacres committed during the Eritrean War of Independence has been recorded.

== Besikdira School ==
The village of Besikdira hosted the only school within the entire Sekwina region, built in 1962 by Father Gebrekudos Meskel. The primary school was shut for 20 years after the war, but rebuilt by an Italian aid organisation in 2004.
