= Battle of Halhal =

1962 battle of the Eritrean War of Independence

- Part of Eritrean War of Independence
Date	18 July 1962
Location	Halhal, Ethiopia
Result	Ethiopian victory

Belligerents
Ethiopian Empire	Eritrean Liberation Front

The Battle of Halhal was a battle of the Eritrean War of Independence, and took place on 18 July 1962. In the battle, the Eritrean Liberation Front was able to overrun the local police office in Halhal and control it for an entire day. The defenders, which were Eritrean Police commandos, had been trained by the Israeli military.
