= Ahmed Mohammed Nasser =

Eritrean politician (1946–2014)

Leader of the Eritrean Liberation Front
- In office 1975–1981

Personal details
- Born: 1946 Akele Guzai, Eritrea
- Died: 14 March 2014 (aged 67–68) Stockholm, Sweden

Ahmed Mohammed Nasser was an Eritrean politician who was the chairman of the Eritrean Liberation Front and a key figure during the Eritrean War of Independence.

== Life ==
Ahmad Mohammad Nasser was born in 1946 in a village called Ayromale located in the plains of Dioot of Eastern Akkele-Guzai. He was of Saho descent. In 1964 he joined the Eritrean Liberation Front and was sent to Iraq for training; he graduated as an officer from a military academy and was gifted a pistol and a watch by the Iraqi president Ahmed Hassan al-Bakr. In 1968 he returned to lead the Eritrean Liberation Army and continued as coordinating officer of the liberation army up to the time the historic first national congress of the Eritrean Liberation Front convened in October 1971. At this congress he was elected to the Revolutionary Council, the higher political leadership of the Front. Following the first national congress he still served in military affairs. His training and qualification helped him to accomplish much in areas of developing strategies and tactics compatible with military objectives geared to attainment of a people’s aspiration for liberation in conditions of man-power and resources imbalance that favored the adversary. Ahmad carried on in that capacity until second national congress of 1975.

He led the Eritrean Liberation Front until its defeat at the hands of the Eritrean People's Liberation Front during the Eritrean Civil Wars in 1981. After the independence of Eritrea, Ahmed and his colleagues appealed to Isaias Afwerki to form a national reconciliation government. Their appeal was not answered.

After that, Ahmed was a leader of the ELF-RC and later the National Salvation Front, two Eritrean opposition organizations. In 2012, he resigned his position from the leadership council and decided to continue struggling as an ordinary member. He explained his decision to relieve himself from a leadership position as an attempt to open the way for the young to assume their roles in the struggle.

He died in Sweden at the age of 68.
