= Hamid Idris Awate =

Eritrean guerrilla leader (1910–1962)

- Born: 10 April 1910; Gerset, Italian Eritrea
- Died: 28 May 1962 (aged 52); Haykota, Ethiopia
- Children: Kerrar Hamid Awate (son)

Hamid Idris Awate (Tigrinya: ሓምድ እድሪስ ዓዋተ; 10 April 1910 – 28 May 1962) was an Eritrean revolutionary and prominent guerrilla commander, and a symbol of the Eritrean War of Independence and independence struggle.

== Early life ==
Awate was born between 1910 and 1915 in Gerset, located between Tessenei and Golluj in southwestern Italian Eritrea. Hamid was of Beni-Amer descent.

The life of Hamid was obscure and controversial, according to many sources Hamid was an Eritrean Ascari that participated in the Italian conquest of Ethiopia and the East African Campaign before deserting after the Battle of Gondar. However other sources assert that that he was actually an NCO in the Sudan Defence Force during the Second World War while others state that he was nothing more than a farmer in the Ghinda area before becoming a shifta in 1941.

In the early 1940s, Hamid settled in western Eritrea and recruited an army of 50 people. He then began to raid the Kunama and Nara tribes from 1942 to 1948. His actions eventually attracted the attention of the British authorities, who offered a considerable award for his capture, dead or alive. Afterwards, Hamid and his armed faction surrendered to British in 1951 after they agreed not to prosecute him for his crimes. However, after 1956, he once again taken up arms due to continued attacks from Christian highland shifta and in protest against the land policy of the Ethiopian officials who had just taken control of Eritrea.

== Resistance against Ethiopia ==
Hamid's activities against the security forces in Eritrea coincided with a growing militancy among Eritrean nationalists against the Ethiopian occupation. In 1958 a group of Eritrean exiles in Cairo founded the Eritrean Liberation Movement under the leadership of Mohammed Saeed Nawed.

In July 1960, in the city of Cairo, a group of young Eritrean students and intellectuals held a meeting and formed the Eritrean Liberation Front (ELF). The group consisted of the following men: Idris Mohammed Adam (the president of the National Assembly of Eritrea); Idris Osman Galaydos (a graduate of law school of Cairo University); Mohammed Saleh Hummed (a graduate of law school of Cairo University); Said Hussian (a student of Al-Az'har University in Cairo); Adem Mohammed Akte (a graduate from University of Cairo) and Taha Mohammed Noor (a graduate from Italy). Hamid was persuaded, possibly by his fellow Beni-Amer, Idris Mohammed Adam, to join the Eritrean Liberation Front and continue his shifta activity under the auspices of the liberation movement.

Back home, the Eritrean authorities were suspicious of Hamid's movements and activities and were watching him closely. Eritrean police forces planned to arrest Hamid in his village in August 1961. Turki explains that the Ethiopians deployed a large amount of police forces but their plans were foiled by an Eritrean Muslim within the Eritrean police who informed Hamid earlier of that plan. Hamid then fled to Mount Adal located to the west of Agordat.

Hamid's decision to begin armed resistance was reached after a period of long deliberations with other Muslims. In an interview with Eritrea Al-haditha, issue #75, second year, pioneer Mohammed Al-Hassan Dohen, a long time friend of Hamid and Hamid's assistant when he was district chief, says: "In the year 1960, Idris Mohammed Adem sent a message to Hamid. Hamid Awate told me that Idris Mohammed Adem was asking him to declare the armed struggle; but he was not ready for it at that time. After four months, Mohammed Al-Shiekh Daood came and asked Hamid to declare the revolution. Hamid agreed to lead the armed struggle and declare the revolution but asked for money and weapons as long as he was notorious Outlaw. Mohammed Al-Shiekh Daood braved Hamid with old arms, three five bullet rifles "abu khamsa" and gave him 3 Birr with sugar and tea all was provided through Egyptian Muslims. In addition, Ibrahim Mohammed Ali brought two rifles.

On 1 September 1961, eleven guerrilla fighters led by Hamid attacked police posts in the west of Eritrea include one on Mount Adal which would mark the official beginning of the armed struggle for independence according to Eritrean histography. A fierce battle ensued between Hamid's and Eritrean police forces, lasting 30 minutes ending in a stalemate.

== Death ==
On May 27, 1962, Awate told his unit that he was not feeling well. His condition began to deteriorate quickly. It is said that Awate called pioneer Kiboob Hajaj and gave him his beloved gun emphasizing on the continuation of the revolution. On the morning of next day, Awate died; his companions buried him secretly and did not reveal his death until four years later.

A statue was erected by the Government of Eritrea on 1 September 1994 at his grave site.

On 16 October 2011, Eritrea's national hero, Hamid Idris Awate, was honoured by the town of Cologno Monzese near Milan which dedicated a tree in his name in the area within the Aldo Moro Park called "Garden of the Just of the World". Eritrea's hero Hamid was one of the nine persons who were honoured with dedication of nine trees for their services and sacrifices for justice. Padre Marino Haile was one of the attendants of the ceremony at Cologno Monteze. Many friends of Eritrea attended the ceremony together with Eritrean nationals who included Mr. Kidanemariam Michael, president of the City Council for Peace of Cologno and Dr. Seghid Herui.

Even in Italy Hamid is celebrated by the Italo-Eritrean associations.
