= Eritrean Liberation Movement =

Liberation movement in Eritrea

Eritrean Liberation Movement حركة التحرير الإريترية
- Founders: Mohammed Saeed Nawed; Saleh Ahmed Iyay; Yasin Aqeda
- Founded: 1958
- Dissolved: 1965
- Succeeded by: Eritrean Liberation Front
- Headquarters: Port Sudan, Sudan (in exile)
- Ideology: Eritrean independence

The Eritrean Liberation Movement (Arabic: حركة التحرير الإريترية, romanized: Harakat al-Tahrir al-Iritriyya; Tigrinya: ምንቅስቓስ ሓርነት ኤርትራ, lit. 'mǝnǝqǝsǝq̲ās ḥārǝnat erǝtǝrā'), abbreviated as ELM, and also known as Haraka, was a political organization located in Eritrea. Founded in Port Sudan, Sudan, in 1958 by Eritrean exiles Mohammed Saeed Nawed, Saleh Ahmed Iyay and Yasin Aqeda, it was the first organized nationalist movement in Eritrea that sought independence from Ethiopian rule following the dissolution of the Eritrean-Ethiopian federation.

Dismantled in 1965 and, although short-lived, later overshadowed by armed movements such as the Eritrean Liberation Front (ELF), the ELM played a foundational role in shaping Eritrea's liberation ideology and mobilizing early nationalist sentiment.

== History ==
=== Background ===
In 1952, Eritrea federated with Ethiopia as an autonomous entity under a United Nations resolution. However, the Ethiopian government under Emperor Haile Selassie gradually dismantled the federation, culminating in annexation in 1962, with Eritrea becoming a province in Ethiopia. The move was widely opposed in Eritrea, where a growing number of activists began to seek full independence.

Amidst this political suppression, a group of educated Eritrean professionals, teachers, and workers in exile formed the Eritrean Liberation Movement in Port Sudan. The organization sought to organize Eritreans both in Sudan and within Eritrea to resist Ethiopian domination through nonviolent political struggle.

=== Formation and activities ===
The ELM operated as a clandestine movement with a cell-based structure. It was particularly active among urban populations and aimed to promote Eritrean nationalism and unity, raise political consciousness through education and oppose Ethiopian occupation through peaceful means

The movement avoided ethnic, religious, or regional bias and focused on creating a broad-based national identity. Members were primarily drawn from the Eritrean working class, students, and civil servants.

Contemporary commentary described the Eritrean struggle as one of the longest anti-colonial wars in the modern era, and the ELM as its political incubator. It laid the groundwork for later armed resistance, such as the Eritrean Liberation Front, founded in 1960.

=== Decline ===
By the early 1960s, Ethiopian intelligence services had discovered the existence of the ELM. A major crackdown followed, leading to the arrest and imprisonment of many of its members. The movement was effectively dismantled by 1965, though its legacy continued in the ideology and organization of the ELF and, later, the EPLF.

== Legacy ==
Although it did not engage in armed struggle, the ELM is considered the ideological precursor to the Eritrean Liberation Front (ELF) and other independence movements. It introduced the concept of grassroots political organization, national consciousness, and pan-Eritrean identity, which became pillars of the broader independence struggle.

== See also ==
- Eritrean Liberation Front
- Eritrean People's Liberation Front
- Eritrean War of Independence
- History of Eritrea
