= Battle of Adal =

1961 battle of the Eritrean War of Independence

- Part of Eritrean War of Independence
Date	1 September 1961
Location	Adal, Ethiopia
Result	ELF victory: Start of the Eritrean War of Independence

Belligerents
Ethiopian Empire	Eritrean Liberation Front

Commanders and leaders
Unknown	Hamid Idris Awate

Strength
Unknown	14

Casualties and losses
Unknown	1 captured

The Battle of Adal took place on 1 September 1961, and was the first battle in the Eritrean War of Independence. In the battle, the Eritrean Liberation Front, which numbered at only 14, was able to overcome the local Ethiopian forces. Rebel weaponry included 1 British and 3 old Italian guns, while the majority of Rebels were unarmed. The battle begun at 9:00 AM, and lasted about six hours, and is commemorated in Eritrea as Revolution Day.

The rebels who participated were:

- Hamid Idris Awate (ELF leader)
- Abdu M. Fayd
- Ibrahim M. Ali
- Humed Qadif
- Awate M. Fayd
- Mohammed Bayraq (taken prisoner, later died in 1975 in an Ethiopian prison)
- Mohammed Adem Hisan
- Saleh Qaruj
- Ahmed Fikak
- Mohammed Hassen Duhe
- Adem Faqurai
- Ali Bakhit
- Idris Mohamoud
- Omar Karay
