= Mohammed Saeed Nawed =

Mohammed Saeed Nawed (Arabic: محمد سعيد ناود) (1926 - 2010) was an Eritrean leader and the creator of the Eritrean Liberation Movement (ELM), and was a prominent cultural and political figure in Eritrea.

He is the author of what is considered to be the first Eritrean novel written in Arabic, The Winter's Journey: Salih, published in 1978.

== Death ==
Nawed died on September 16, 2010. in Asmara upon his return from Kuwait.
