= Memorial square =

A memorial square is an intersection dedicated in memory of someone, usually someone who was killed in a war. It is not the same as a town square. While the name of a town square is used to describe where something is located, the name of a memorial square is not used in the same manner.

Memorial squares are also erected to commemorate events or symbolize a specific ethos embodied in the death of one or more persons related to specific cause. This type of memorial square has been built in post-Soviet states such as Uzbekistan where memorial squares and parks have been established in memory of both civilians and soldiers who died in a specific conflict, i.e. World War II.
