= Eritrean Civil Wars =

1972–1974 and 1980–1981 conflicts in Eritrea

- Part of the Eritrean War of Independence, the Ethiopian Civil War and conflicts in the Horn of Africa
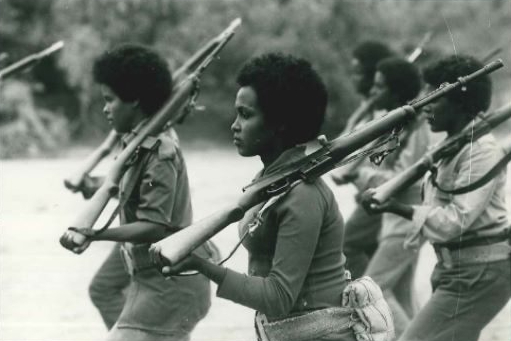
- Eritrean women fighters.
Date	1st Civil War: February 1972 – 13 October 1974; 2nd Civil War: February 1980 – 24 March 1981
Location	Ethiopian Empire and Socialist Ethiopia
Result	1st Civil War: ELF fails to suppress rivals 2nd Civil War: ELF decisively defeated

Belligerents
ELF	EPLF (Tigray Region) TPLF (1980-81)

Commanders and leaders
Ahmed Mohammed Nasser	Isaias Afewerki (Tigray Region) Meles Zenawi

The Eritrean Civil Wars were two conflicts that were fought between competing organizations for the liberation of Eritrea.

The First Eritrean Civil War was fought from 1972 to 1974. The Eritrean Liberation Front (ELF) tried to suppress dissident groups that disliked the ELF leadership and wished to break away to form a new insurgency. Dissidents included Christians who resented an alleged Islamic bias in the ELF, inhabitants of the coast with regionalist concerns, and radical Marxists. The ELF failed to suppress the dissident groups, who ultimately united themselves into the Eritrean People's Liberation Front (EPLF).

The Second Eritrean Civil War was fought from 1980 to 1981. The EPLF attacked the ELF when it appeared that the ELF were attempting to negotiate a peace deal with the enemy Soviet and Ethiopian governments. The ELF was defeated and pushed out of Eritrea. The remnants of the ELF withdrew to the Sudan.

== Background ==
In 1952, Eritrea was federated with Ethiopia under great domestic controversy. Throughout the federation the autonomy of Eritrea was whittled away until it was no longer legal to teach in all of Eritrea's tongues. With increasing divisiveness being sown in the local press between Christians and Muslims the ELF was formed in Cairo, Egypt by a number of Eritrean Muslim intellectuals in 1960.

This organization was socialist in nature, however attracted mostly Muslim fighters in the early 1960s. By the late 1960s, the frustration with the dissolution of the federation had pushed Eritrean Christians to join the fight for independence. Integration of Christian fighters under Muslim commanders did not go well and the regional emphasis of the ELF caused friction between the old guard and the new radical students.

This friction lead to the separation of parts of ELF from the ELF Command, sparking a military conflict. In the words of the ELF command, the purpose of the conflict was, "...to assert the continuation of the revolution through the liquidation of counter-revolution..."

== First Civil War ==
The First Civil War was fought by the ELF against the nascent organizations of the Popular Liberation Forces that were formerly under the command of the ELF and the Obel group. Fighting began in February 1972 and spread through lowlands, particularly the Red Sea coast. Eventually this conflict spread further into the highlands until in October 1974 calls for the conflict to stop were finally heeded after a battle at Woki left 600 fighters dead. These calls for peace came from local villagers at a time when the independence movement was close to victory over Ethiopia. The ELF and EPLF negotiated an agreement at Koazien in January 1975 in which they agreed to fight the Ethiopian government together. There were around 3,000 casualties from this civil war, more than the Eritreans had lost fighting the government for thirteen years up to this point.

== Second Civil War ==
The Second Civil War was executed by the EPLF against the ELF in a bid to protect the flanks of the Front under tremendous pressure from a resurgent Ethiopia. In 1980, the ELF had entered into secret negotiations with the Soviet Union to end the war. Furthermore, on defence of the Sahel stronghold of the EPLF, ELF units withdrew from the lines in August of the same year. This created tremendous friction between the fronts which eventually led to the resumption of conflict. By this point the ELF had been drained during the Ethiopian resurgence after Soviet assistance was leveraged, and were eventually defeated by the EPLF forces in 1981. The TPLF also assisted in driving the ELF out of Eritrea. They were eventually pushed across the border into the Sudan.

== See also ==
- Eritrean War of Independence
- History of Eritrea
