= Eritrean Liberation Front =

Independence movement in Eritrea during the 1960s and 1970s

- Tigrinya: ተጋደሎ ሓርነት ኤርትራ; Arabic: جبهة التحرير الإريترية; Italian: Fronte di Liberazione Eritreo
- Flag of the ELF adopted from the flag of the Eritrean-Ethiopian federation
- Founder: Idris Mohammed Adem
- Leaders: Idris Mohammed Adem (1960–1975); Ahmed Mohammed Nasser (1975–1981)
- Dates active: 1960–1981 (21 years)
- Country: Eritrea
- Headquarters: Kassala, Sudan (1965)
- Active regions: Eritrea (1960–1981)
- Ideology: Eritrean nationalism Marxism (majority); Conservatism (factions)
- Wars: Ethiopian Civil War; Eritrean War of Independence; Battle of Adal; Battle of Omal; Battle of Halhal; Battle of Togoruba; Siege of Barentu; Eritrean Civil Wars

The Eritrean Liberation Front (ELF; Tigrinya: ተጋደሎ ሓርነት ኤርትራ; Arabic: جبهة التحرير الإريترية; Italian: Fronte di Liberazione Eritreo), colloquially known as Jebha, was an Eritrean separatist paramilitary and political organization as well as the vanguard Eritrean independence movement which sought Eritrea's secession from Ethiopia from the 1960s until the mid-1970s.

After the Ethiopian Empire violated a 1952 UN resolution that guaranteed Eritrea the right to an autonomous government, the ELF was established in 1960 in order to wage an armed struggle for independence. Under Emperor Haile Selassie, the Ethiopian government banned Eritrean political parties, free press and right to assembly. During 1961, the ELF began the Eritrean War of Independence. Idris Muhammad Adam and other Eritrean intellectuals founded the ELF as a primary Pan Arab movement in Cairo, but the first act of armed resistance was led by Hamid Idris Awate. Over the course of the 1960s, the ELF was able to obtain support from Arab countries such as Egypt and Sudan. However, tensions between Muslims and Christians in the ELF along with the failure of the ELF to ward off Ethiopia's 1967–1968 counter offensive internally fractured the ELF, causing it to split.

By the mid 1970s, the ELF and the Eritrean People's Liberation Front (EPLF), an ELF-splinter group and ideologically Maoist liberation movement, were the key separatists movements in Eritrea. The EPLF ultimately overtook the ELF as the primary Eritrean independence movement by 1977, and the ELF was subsequently defeated in 1981.

== History ==
=== Origins (1948–1959) ===
After Italy was defeated in World War II, the fate of Ethiopia and Eritrea was left to the United Nations. A 1948 UN commission failed to agree on whether Eritrea would be independent. In 1952, Eritrea became officially part of Ethiopia under UN Resolution 390 A, which was passed on December 2, 1950. However, Eritrea would remain an autonomous government, meaning that the country could have their own government structures, flag, and official language. Ethiopia was also prohibited from forcibly intervening in Eritrea's domestic occurrences.

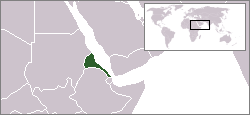
Location of Eritrea (green).

However, some Eritreans were not satisfied with the UN's decision to place Eritrea under Ethiopian control. Early independence movements can be traced back to 1949, when some Muslims living in Eritrea formed a group that would grow into the Eritrean Liberation Front. Nonetheless, in the early 1950s, this group remained relatively inactive.

Location of Ethiopia (red).

Discontent with the Ethiopian government ensured as Emperor Haile Selassie took actions to destabilize Eritrea's autonomous government. As Ethiopia was more authoritarian than Eritrea, Selassie felt that increased freedom in Eritrea would destabilize Ethiopia. Consequently, the same year that the UN resolution went into effect, Selassie disposed of Eritrea's constitution. In 1953, the Eritrean Trade Union was outlawed. By 1955, Eritrea's president was removed and a year later, the Eritrean National Assembly ceased to exist. The year 1956 also marked the year that Amharic replaced Arabic and Tigrinya as the official language of Eritrea. The coming years also saw the suppression of insurgency movements against Ethiopia, the arrests of newspaper editors who spoke against the Ethiopian crown, the seizure of private Eritrean businesses, and the removal of the Eritrean flag.

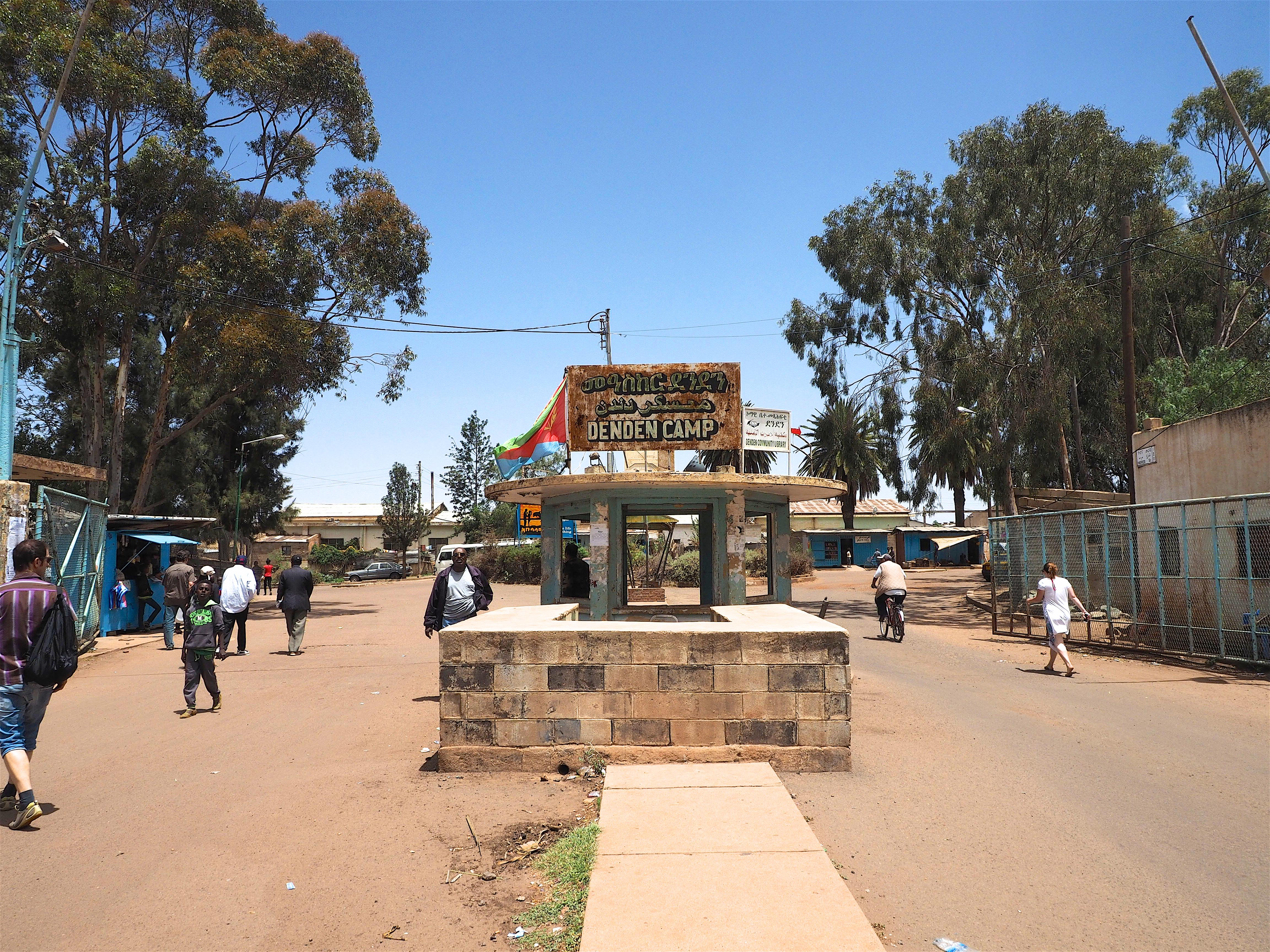
Kagnew Station, Asmara, Eritrea

The United States remained inactive despite the UN Resolution being flagrantly violated. This was due to a 1953 agreement signed between the United States and Ethiopia, which guaranteed access to the Kagnew Radiomarina in Asmara. This Red Sea military base was vital for the United States military since it enhanced overseas communication. Nonetheless, higher unemployment rates and taxes caused tens of thousands of Eritreans to emigrate to Saudi Arabia and Sudan. The Ethiopian army successfully suppressed protests that arose in Eritrea, including a 1958 trade union strike. The struggle for independence turned violent with this strike as many protesters were killed.

=== Founding and decline Eritrean Liberation Movement (1958–1959) ===
In 1958, the Eritrean Liberation Movement (ELM) was founded. The ELM, which was composed primarily of students and laborers, focused on organizing demonstrations against Ethiopian occupation. ELM strongholds were located in the urban central highlands, where a large proportion of Christians lived. It organized Eritreans clandestinely and played a significant role in awakening nationalist sentiments in urban areas until a major police crackdown. While the ELM had played a positive role in working towards self-determination, the organization proved incapable of escalating to armed struggle against the Ethiopian Empire.

=== Formation of the Eritrean Liberation Front (1960–1962) ===
After the Eritrean Liberation Movement demonstrated it wasn't ready to engage in war, a new liberation organization that could fight back against the Ethiopians was formed in order to fill the gap. In 1960, Egypt began to fund military training for Eritreans in Alexandria. Future revolutionary leaders such as Idris Muhammad Adam were trained at the Alexandria military camp. The tactics that this camp used were influenced by those of the national liberation front in Algeria. In addition to military training, Egypt also provided media resources for Eritreans to use to gain support for the independence movement. For instance, Woldeab Woldemariam used his Radio Cairo radio program to publicize anti-Ethiopian propaganda and encourage Eritreans to join the uprising against Ethiopia.

In July 1960, the ELF was openly established in Cairo by Idris Muhammad Adam and other Eritrean intellectuals and students. The founders of the ELF were primarily Muslim and the movement thus adopted Pan-Arabic beliefs. Some scholars argue that the Eritrean independence movement was religious in nature: by 1971, the majority of ELF army members were Muslim and the Ethiopian ruling class was Christian.

Egypt helped organize Arab support for the ELF. The Arab League countries such as Syria, Iraq, Libya, Kuwait, and Yemen pledged their support for the ELF in April 1962. These countries saw the economic potential of Arab control of the Red Sea and the Suez Canal. They also felt compelled to help their fellow Muslims attain independence from the Christian Ethiopians. Additionally, Sudan and Egypt worked together in attempt to prevent Ethiopian access to the Nile River. As a consequence, Sudan allowed the ELF to use their land to ship weapons to and organize military operations. However, despite the emergence of the ELF, the United States chose to remain loyal to Ethiopia as they signed a secret pact with Ethiopia affirming their opposition to Eritrean insurgency movements.

=== Beginning of Eritrean struggle for independence (1961–1962) ===
Hamid Idris Awate was a former soldier when the Italians controlled Eritrea and Ethiopia who had not joined the ELM or ELF. The ELF had purchased rifles that were used during the colonial era, leading them to have Awate initiate the first battle in the Eritrean independence movement. In August 1961, Awate had been hiding from Ethiopian authorities on Mount Abal. On September 1, 1961, Awate came into confrontation with the Ethiopian government, which is when he used guerilla war tactics to continue the ELF's struggle. The September 26, 1961 issue of the Ethiopian newspaper Zemen reported Awate's attacks for the first time, labeling him a bandit and giving the Eritrean liberation struggle public attention. In response, Awate motivated further military action by claiming that he was fighting "for the sake of the Eritrean flag and their homeland." Further 1961 attacks took place in Eritrea's western lowlands. These rural communities were composed of Muslims who had been oppressed by the Ethiopian government, thus exhibiting the greatest antagonism for Ethiopia. Also, the western lowlands were close to Sudan, the movement's safe haven. Awate's movement gained momentum when Eritrean members of the Sudan Defense Force joined his movement. By March 1962, the Ethiopian police force were no longer able to suppress Awate's movement, leading Ethiopian authorities to publicly announce that anyone supporting Awate or withholding information regarding Awate would be imprisoned. In June 1962, Awate died, which led to the merger of his group with the ELF. That, with the combination of the Ethiopian government's discovery and subsequent suppression of the ELM, led to the ELF emerging as the main independence movement in Eritrea. On November 14, 1962, Emperor Haile Selassie annexed Eritrea after the Eritrean Assembly voted in favor of annexation and dissolved itself. Selassie remarked that "We thank our people of Eritrea who, guided by a deep sense of patriotism and unity, have labored without crease to bring about this advancement. We vow before God, that, as we have repeatedly stated, we shall spare no effort to secure the happiness and advancement of our people."

=== Expansion of the ELF (1962–1966) ===
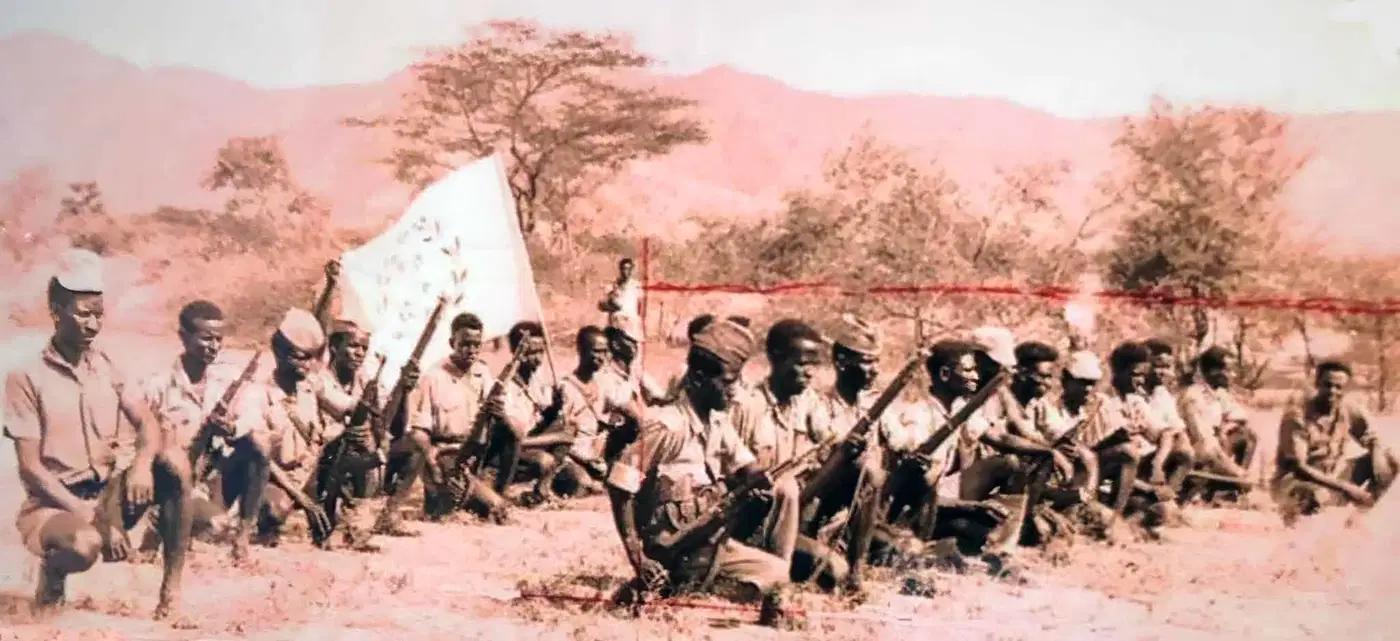
ELF fighters, 1964.

The ELF began to receive arms from Saudi Arabia and North Yemen in 1962. There were 250 members of the ELF in 1963. That was also the year when military aid in the form of weapons from China, Iraq, and Syria intensified. The ELF then raided several Ethiopian bases and military establishments with this aid between 1961 and 1965. This era was also when women also began to play a role in the ELF: they sent messages, obtained weapons, and served as cooks and nurses to the soldiers. In 1965, the ELF army grew to 2,000 members organized in seven platoons.

This led the president of the ELF, Idris Mohamed Adem, to meet with the leaders of each platoon to restructure the ELF in May 1965. They agreed in dividing Eritrea into four Zonal Commands with the Revolutionary Command located in Kassala. Like the Egyptian-funded military training, the organization of the ELF was inspired by the organization of the Algerian national liberation front. The first zone was located in western Eritrea and was populated by Muslims and Beni Amer. Their leader was Mahmoud Dinni. The second zone consisted of Eritrea's northern highlands, which was populated by Muslim nomads and led by Omer Hamed Ezaz. The third province included Eritrea's central plateau, which was populated by Tigrinya-speaking farmers and Muslim Saho pastoralists. Abdelkerim Ahmed was the leader of zone three. The fourth zone was the central and southern coast, consisting of Muslim nomads and led by Mohammed Ali Omero. As a consequence of this restructuring, the ELF was strong enough to prevent Ethiopia from entirely controlling Eritrea. They also maintained control through their "belief that they had the sole mandate of representing the Eritrean people." Therefore, they suppressed any other liberation movement.

Members of the Organization of African Unity (OAU).

As the ELF grew in strength, Ethiopia increased military spending by 68.2%. Also, the relationship between Ethiopia and Sudan fractured as each country supported the liberation movements in the other country. This weakened both countries militarily and politically. Emperor Haile Selassie of Ethiopia and President Nasser of Egypt also worked with the Organization of African Unity (OAU) in the early 1960s to ease hostility between the two nations. However, Egypt did not terminate its support for the ELF; they just moved their operations to Syria.

=== Internal problems (1966–1971) ===
In 1966, the ELF began to incorporate Christians into the movement. This resulted in an increasing amount of military confrontations in the highlands near Sudan. As a result, a fifth Zonal command that covered the Eritrean highlands was established by Osman Idris Galadewos. Concerned about the growing strength of the ELF, Ethiopia procured military support from Israel and the United States to launch a counter-offensive movement against the ELF. The goal of this counter offensive was to internally fracture the ELF between Christians and Muslims, which proved effective by the summer of 1967. Ethiopia first decimated hundreds of villages in Eritrea in early 1967, which caused the Arab countries to suspend their support for the ELF in June 1967. This resulted in Wolde Kahsai's Christian fighters betraying the ELF in the summer of 1967. Another Christian group under Haile Woldetensae's leadership was executed by ELF Muslims after they surrendered to the Ethiopian consulate. Hostility between Christians and Muslims ensured even when the Christians did not deflect to the Ethiopian side of the conflict as proven by the September 1967 massacre of 50 Christians in zone four.

The internal political conflicts and recent military losses experienced by the ELF in the late 1960s convinced members that the ELF had to be restructured. The resulting movement became known as the Eslah movement. The Eslah movement first merged zones three and five together in September 1968, forming the Tripartite Unity Forces. However, this unification did not resolve the ELF's internal division, which led to the Adobha conference between ELF leadership in August 1969. This conference abolished the Zonal Command system and instead redivided Eritrea into three regions. The ELF experienced significant military victories in the aftermath of the 1969 conference, the most prominent of those being the assassination of Ethiopian General Tshomi Ergetu in late 1970. Nonetheless, Ethiopia struck back with the bombing of Keren on Christmas Eve, 1970. Hundreds of women and children died, French journalist Andre Fontaine of Le Monde to remark that the Ethiopians had successfully destabilized the Eritrean independence movement.

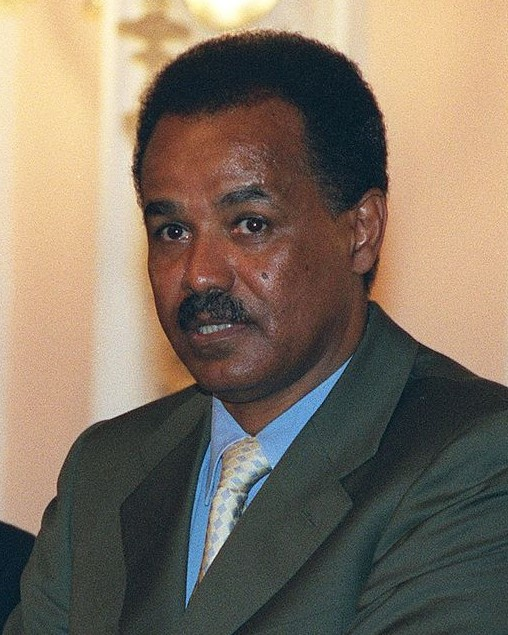
Isaias Afwerki (2002)

Moreover, internal divisions ensured within the ELF during this time period regarding the tension between Muslims and Christians and Eritrea's interactions with Arab countries. The government of the Arab countries released propaganda since 1964 that stressed the homogeneous Arab nature of Eritrea. Also, prominent Christian revolutionary leaders like Woldeab Woldemariam had uneasy relations with the Arab world. This even caused Saudi Arabia to cease its support for the ELF in 1967. Also, there was the 1969 and 1970 massacre of Christian ELF soldiers and the assassination of prominent Christian ELF figures such as Wolde Ghiday and Kidae Kiflu. Therefore, in 1971, Abraham Tewoide and Isaias Afwerki founded a faction that broke away from the ELF that would eventually combine with other breakaway factions to form the Eritrean People's Liberation Front (EPLF). Additionally, women within the ELF established the Women's Union in 1967 to protest the inequalities they faced. Women were dissatisfied that they were unable to hold ranks within the ELF that were comparable to those held by men. Nonetheless, ELF leadership largely ignored these women until the 1971 first National Congress, which is when the ELF first recognized that women were vital to the operation of the ELF.

By 1970, the ELF was estimated to be 1,500 to 2,000 fighters strong.

=== Formation of the Eritrean People's Liberation Front (1971–1973) ===
Although the Eritrean Liberation Forces - People's Liberation Forces (ELF - PLF) formally split from the ELF in 1971, the ELF was strictly divided since mid-1969. This division was a direct consequences of the defeats suffered by the ELF as a result of Ethiopia's 1967–1968 counter offensive. The PLF was frustrated that the ELF Revolutionary Command failed to maintain the support of many Christian fighters during Ethiopia's counter offensive. The PLF also felt that the Revolutionary Command was guilty of insubordination to ELF military leadership, leading Othman Sabbe to call for the complete removal of the Revolutionary Command. The Revolutionary command, on the other hand, felt that PLF members had violated the ranks of the ELF.

After the formal split in 1971, the ELF held its first National Congress to determine the future of the movement. The ELF responded by instituting the ELF Revolutionary Council and structuring their troops into twelve battalions. The ELF also demanded that the breakaway factions rejoin the ELF. War between the ELF and the ELF - PLF was initiated in February 1972 on the directive of the ELF Revolutionary Council.

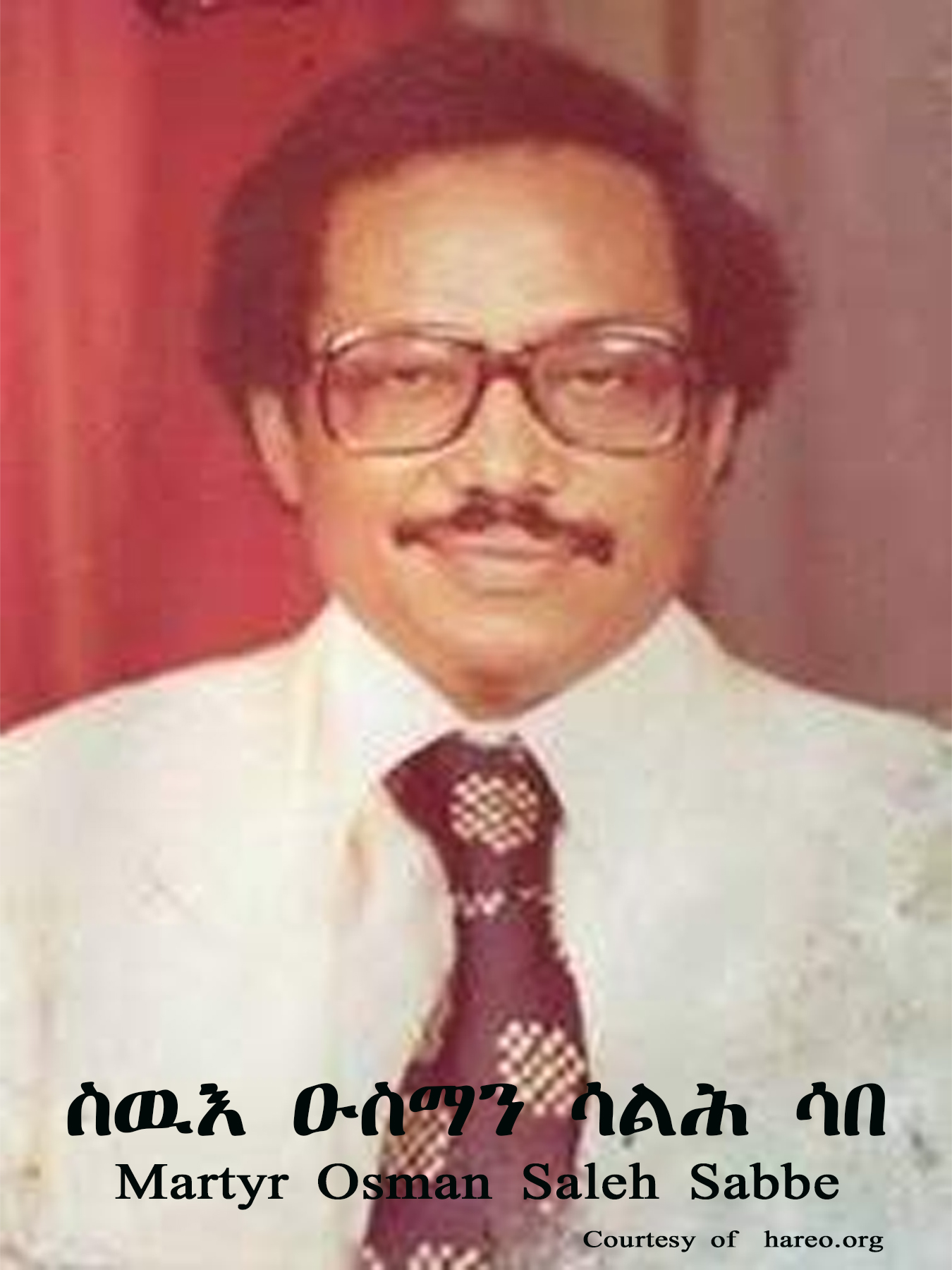
Osman Saleh Sabbe

Under the leadership of Osman Saleh Sabbe, Romadan Mohamed Nur, and Isaias Afwerki, the EPLF was formed in August 1973 from the ELF - PLF and other breakaway factions. Both men received their guerrilla warfare training in China and implemented stringent policies to quash rebellion movements. Inspired by Maoist ideology, the EPLF managed the Eritrean People's Revolutionary Party (EPRP), which was a far left-wing political movement that Nur and Afwerki established in 1971.

=== Liberation of Eritrea (1974–1977) ===
In September 1974, a military junta known as the Derg removed Ethiopian Emperor Haile Selassie from power. This marked a shift in Ethiopia's Cold War alignment from the west to the east. Meanwhile, the rise of President Anwar El Sadat in Egypt converted the country to a western Cold War alignment. This shift in leadership paved the way for Ethiopia's request for Egypt to cease their support for the Eritrean independence movements.

Also, by this time, the EPLF had amassed the support of Eritreans living in the Christian highlands. Nonetheless, Selassie's fall from power enabled the ELF and the EPLF to put aside their differences and jointly invade Asmara in January 1975. This offensive was largely successful; it liberated 95% of Eritrea. Additionally, in May 1975, Idris Mohammed Adem was replaced by Ahmed Mohammed Nasser as the leader of the ELF. By the mid-1975, Ethiopia began to fight back against the Eritrean independence movements by using propaganda to counter the Arab countries' notion of a holy war. This caused Ethiopia's relationship with Egypt and Sudan to deteriorate. Consequently, Sudan continued to support Eritrean independence movements and secured Egyptian support if Ethiopia were to invade Sudan. Furthermore, as Ethiopia was allied with the Soviets, Egypt provided aid to Eritrean independence movements out of fear of the Nile River being controlled by the USSR.

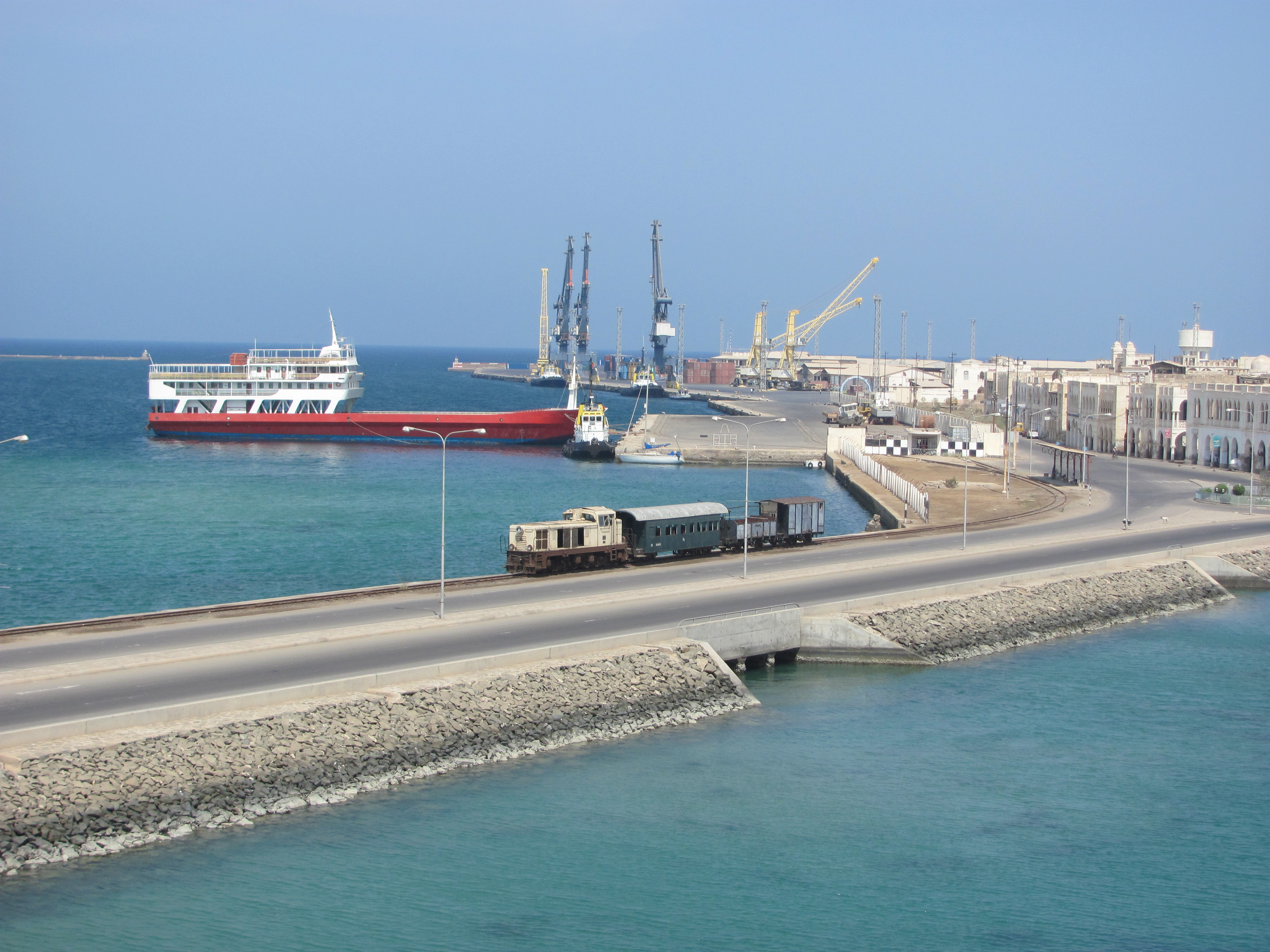
Massawa harbour

By 1977, the EPLF was the primary independence movement in Eritrea. The EPLF captured Keren in late 1976, establishing an efficient city administration and filling the markets with food. The liberation movements also forced an Ethiopian retreat after a week of fighting in Asmara, leaving many dead soldiers on the streets unburied. In Massawa, the EPLF managed to hold off the Ethiopians in early 1977, despite Soviet assistance. Nonetheless, as a result of the fighting, over 90,000 Eritreans were homeless in 1977, leading the EPLF to provide medical and food assistance.

Eritrean cities map

The EPLF also allowed women to undergo military training in 1975. Between January 23 and 31, 1977, the EPLF convened in Sahel for the meeting of its first congress. There, the EPLF proposed a plan for Eritrea's independent government, which included steps to resolve gender inequality. Nonetheless, Eritrea's first liberation came to a close, as Ethiopia's army grew to 40,000 troops, following the fall of the Massawa naval base in December 1977 and the fall of Barentu in April 1978.

=== Fall of the ELF (1978–1981) ===
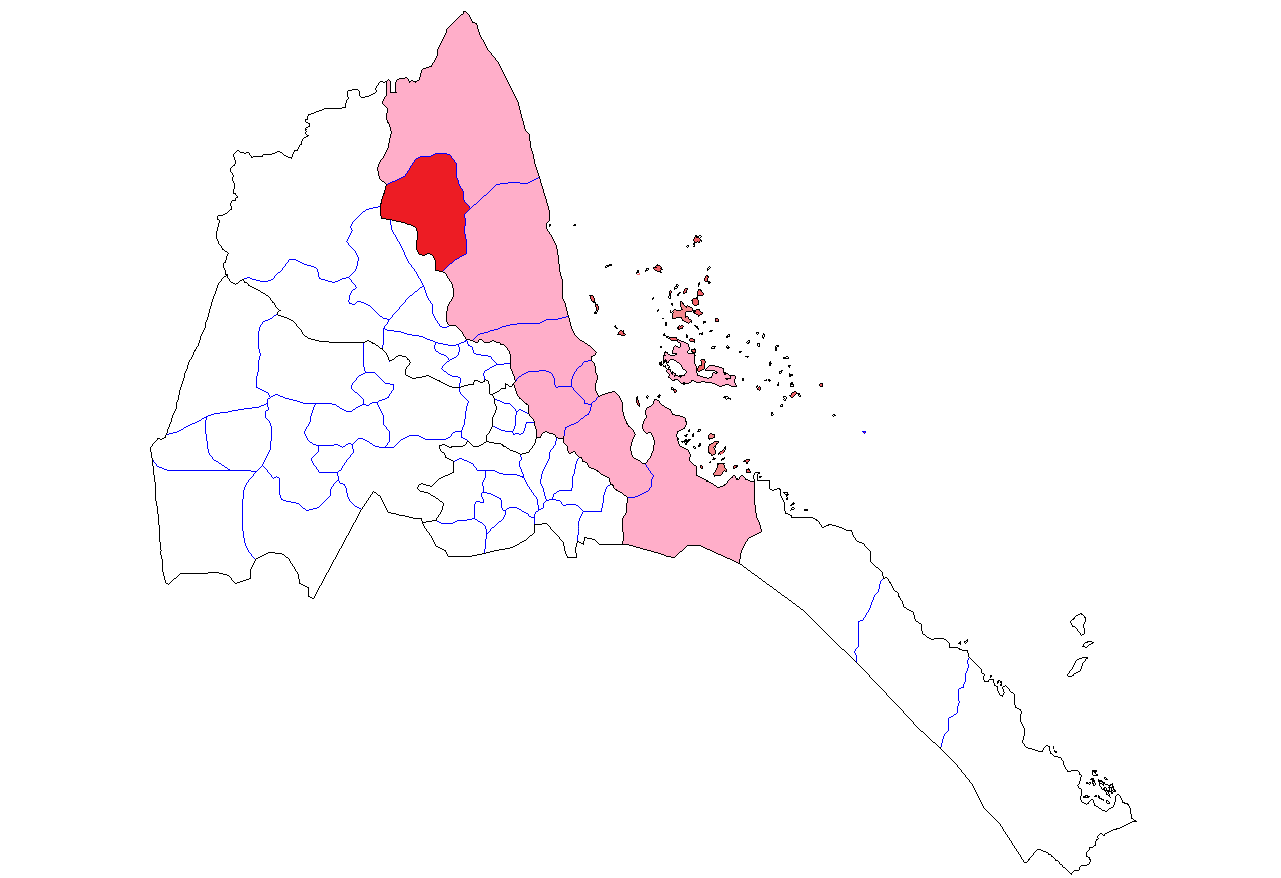
Nakfa (red)

With the assistance of the USSR, Ethiopia successfully took back most of Eritrea by the middle of 1978. Consequently, the EPLF withdrew to Sahel and Nakfa. There, they engaged in sporadic raids of Ethiopian strongholds. The ELF mustered support from the Arab world to attempt a counter offensive on the Ethiopian army. However, the attack failed and the ELF placed the EPLF at fault for not aiding their counter offensive. The EPLF also suspected the ELF of working with the Arab countries to reach a peace agreement with Ethiopia. Therefore, in 1980, hostility between the EPLF and ELF reemerged after the ELF left the Sahel. The EPLF reclaimed the northern Red Sea area of Eritrea in 1980 whereas the ELF fled to Sudan in the face of battle with Ethiopia and the EPLF. In Sudan, the ELF lost their weapons and consequently dissolved. Therefore, in 1981, the EPLF was the only Eritrean independence movement still afloat.

The Eritrean War for Independence continued for another ten years, with the EPLF as the primary independence movement. Eritrea achieved full independence on May 24, 1991.

== Affiliated organizations ==
- General Union of Eritrean Students
- General Union of Eritrean Workers
- General Union of Eritrean Women
- General Union of Eritrean Peasants
- Eritrean Red Cross and Red Crescent Society
