= Eritrean War of Independence =

1961–1991 conflict within Ethiopia

- Part of Opposition to Haile Selassie, the Ethiopian Civil War, the Cold War, the Sino-Soviet split, the conflicts in the Horn of Africa, and the Revolutions of 1989
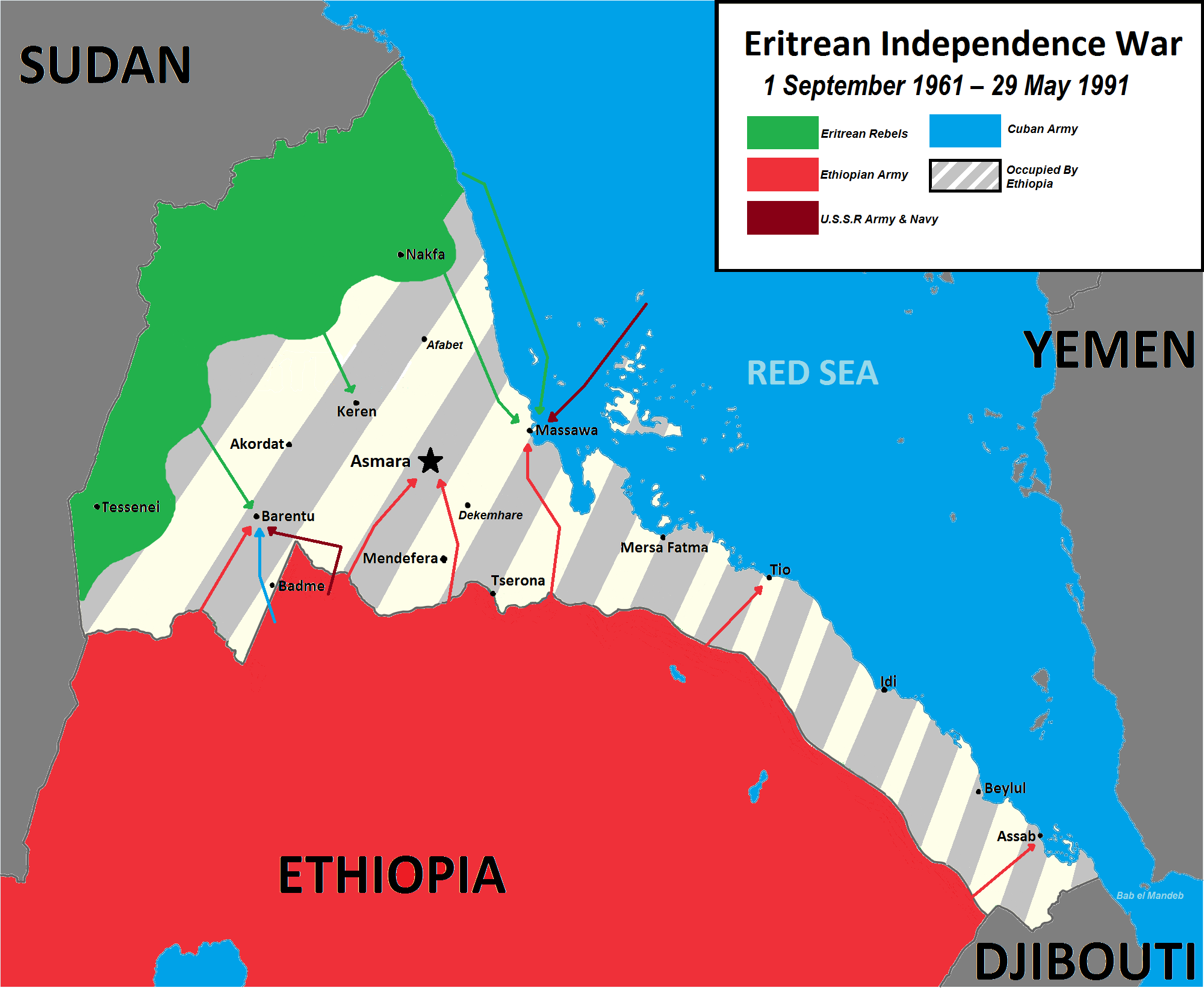
- Military situation during the Eritrean War of Independence
Date	1 September 1961 – 29 May 1991 (29 years, 8 months and 4 weeks)
Location	Predominantly: Eritrea Province
Result	EPLF victory: Eritrean insurgency begins in 1961; ELF defeated by EPLF during the Eritrean Civil Wars; EPLF overthrew the Derg regime; Eritrea gains de facto independence from Ethiopia in 1991 under EPLF rule, and de jure independence after the referendum held in 1993 under UN auspices
Territorial changes	Independence of Eritrea: Ethiopia becomes a landlocked country.

Belligerents
ELF (1961–1981) EPLF (since 1973) (Tigray Region) TPLF (since 1975)	1961–1974; Ethiopian Empire Military advisers: Israel (1966–1973); 1974–1991; Derg (1974–1987); PDR Ethiopia (1987–1991) Military advisers: Soviet Union (1974–1990); Cuba (1974–1990); Israel (1990–1991)

Commanders and leaders
Hamid Idris Awate †; Ahmed Mohammed Nasser Isaias Afewerki; Romodan Mohammed Nur; Petros Solomon; Sebhat Ephrem; Mesfin Hagos (Tigray Region) Meles Zenawi	Haile Selassie I Aserate Kassa Mengistu Haile Mariam; Tesfaye Gebre Kidan; Fikre Selassie Wogderess; Fisseha Desta; Merid Negussie ‡‡ Berhanu Bayeh

Strength
2,000 (1970); 30,000 (1975); 110,000 (1990)	11,000 (1970); 120,000 (1984) (Ethiopia) 123,000 (1990)

Casualties and losses
65,000–70,000 killed	c. 100,000 killed (Note: (1974–1991)); 33,895 captured
- 150,000–280,000 civilians killed (Note: (1977–1991)); 440,000–600,000+ displaced (Note: 1977–1991)

The Eritrean War of Independence (Tigrinya: ውግእ ሰውራ ኤርትራ) was an armed conflict and insurgency aimed at achieving self-determination and independence for Eritrea from Ethiopian rule. Starting in 1961, Eritrean insurgents engaged in guerrilla warfare to liberate Eritrea Province from the rule of the Ethiopian Empire under Haile Selassie and later the Derg under Mengistu Haile Mariam. Their efforts ultimately succeeded in 1991 with the fall of the Derg regime.

Eritrea was an Italian colony from the 1880s until the Italians were defeated by the Allies in World War II in 1941. Afterward, Eritrea briefly became a British Military Administration until 1951. The United Nations convened after the war to decide Eritrea's future, voting in favor of a federation between Eritrea and Ethiopia. As a result, Eritrea became a constituent state of the Federation of Ethiopia and Eritrea.

The federation was intended to last for ten years, during which Eritrea would operate as an autonomous region with its own parliament, while remaining under the Ethiopian crown. However, Eritrea's autonomy was progressively curtailed during the 1950s as Unionist parties gained influence within the Eritrean Assembly. As dissatisfaction with Ethiopian rule grew among Muslim Eritreans, an independence movement called the Eritrean Liberation Front (ELF) was formed in Cairo in 1961 by a group of Eritrean exiles led by Idris Muhammad Adam.

In September 1961 the head of the ELF, Hamid Idris Awate, launched an armed struggle for independence. During 1962, the federation was dissolved by the imperial government and Eritrea was formally annexed by the Ethiopian Empire. This resulted in many Eritreans lending support to the ELF's efforts to achieve independence. Ethiopian imperial army counterinsurgency campaigns against the ELF during the 1960s terrorized the civilian population, leading to even greater local support for the insurgency and significant international attention being brought to the war. Following the Ethiopian Revolution in 1974, the Derg, led by Mengistu, abolished the Ethiopian Empire and established a Marxist-Leninist communist state. The Derg enjoyed support from the Soviet Union and other communist nations in fighting against the Eritreans. The ELF was also supported diplomatically and militarily by various countries. During the Eritrean Civil Wars, the Eritrean People's Liberation Front (EPLF) emerged as the primary liberation group in 1977, after expelling the ELF from Eritrea. The EPLF then took advantage of the Ogaden War to intensify its war of attrition against Ethiopia.

As the Mengistu regime declined at the end of the 1980s and was overwhelmed by Ethiopian insurgent groups, the EPLF decisively defeated Ethiopian forces deployed in Eritrea during May 1991. The Ethiopian People's Revolutionary Democratic Front (EPRDF), with the help of the EPLF, defeated the People's Democratic Republic of Ethiopia (PDRE) when it took control of the capital Addis Ababa a month later. In April 1993, the Eritrean people voted almost unanimously in favour of independence in the Eritrean independence referendum, with formal international recognition of an independent, sovereign Eritrea in the same year.

== Background ==
The Italians colonised Eritrea in 1882 and ruled it until 1941. In 1935, Italy invaded Ethiopia and declared it part of their colonial empire, which they called Italian East Africa. Italian Somaliland and Eritrea were also part of that entity, ruled by a Governor-General or Viceroy.

Conquered by the Allies in 1941, Italian East Africa was sub-divided. Italian Somaliland remained under Italian rule, but as a United Nations protectorate not a colony, until 1960 when it united with British Somaliland, to form the independent state of Somalia.

Eritrea was made a British Military Administration from the end of World War II until 1951. However, there was debate as to what should happen with Eritrea after the British left. The British delegation to the United Nations proposed that Eritrea be divided along religious lines with the Christians to Ethiopia and the Muslims to Sudan. In 1952, the United Nations decided to federate Eritrea with Ethiopia, hoping to reconcile Ethiopian claims of sovereignty and Eritrean aspirations for independence. About nine years later, encouraged by the pro-union majority formed by the Unionist Party and the MLWP in the Eritrean Assembly, Ethiopian Emperor Haile Selassie dissolved the federation and annexed Eritrea, triggering a thirty-year armed struggle in Eritrea.

== Revolution ==
Map of Ethiopia while Eritrea was still attached as a federation, and later as an annexation

During the 1960s, the Eritrean independence struggle was led by the Eritrean Liberation Front (ELF) in resistance to Ethiopia's annexation of Eritrea long after Italian control ended. The Ethiopian Monarchy's actions against Muslims in the Eritrean government also contributed to the revolution. At first, this group factionalized the liberation movement along ethnic and geographic lines. The initial four zonal commands of the ELF were all lowland areas and primarily Muslim. Few Christians joined the organization in the beginning, fearing Muslim domination.

After growing disenfranchisement with Ethiopian occupation, highland Christians began joining the ELF. This growing influx of Christian volunteers prompted the opening of the fifth (highland Christian) command. Internal struggles within the ELF command coupled with sectarian violence among the various zonal groups splintered the organization.

The war started on 1 September 1961 with the Battle of Adal, when Hamid Idris Awate and his companions engaged the occupying Ethiopian Army and police. In 1962, Emperor Haile Selassie unilaterally dissolved the federation and the Eritrean parliament and annexed the country.

== War (1961–1991) ==
=== 1960s ===
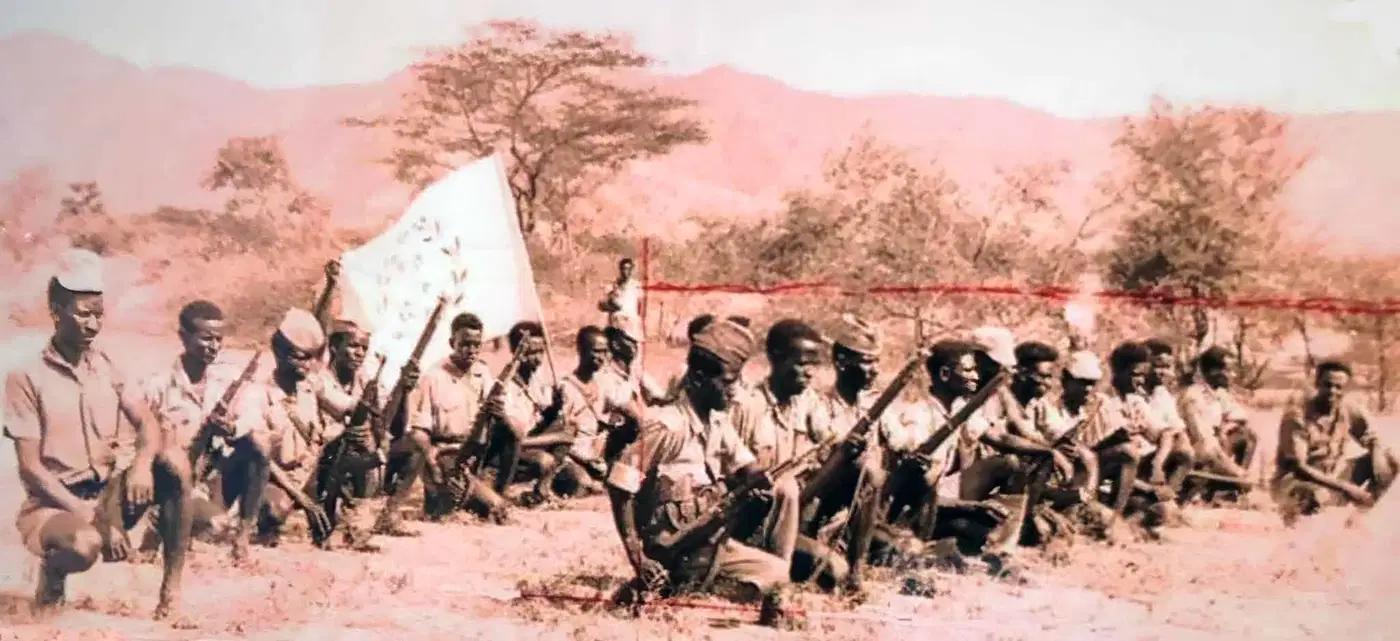
ELF fighters, mid 1960s.

The Eritrean Liberation Front (ELF) was founded in 1961 by a handful of exiled Eritreans, and began guerrilla operations against the Imperial Government in the fashion of the traditional bandits of that province. By 1966, it had a free hand in much of the barren lowlands in western and coastal Eritrea. The movement enjoyed military aid from various Arab countries as virtually all of its leaders were Muslims from the Beni Amer tribe. However, the leadership of the ELF was often inept; and communications between roving guerrilla bands and the exiled leaders were sporadic at best. Nonetheless, it was able to infiltrate small arms and returning trainees by way of Sudan and harass Imperial forces in Eritrea. The ELF was mostly made up of Muslims, as the ELF perceived itself as an Islamic organization engaged in freeing Eritrea, which it described as predominantly Muslim and Arab. However, it was unable to gain the support of the Christian Eritreans, who perceived it an Islamist movement attempting to turn Eritrea into an Arab Muslim state.

The Imperial Ethiopian Army, whose Second Division was based in Eritrea, made periodic sweeps through the countryside. The Israeli trained commando police were more efficient than the army. But the commando police was too few in number to protect important installations and also pursue the insurgents. And the 6,000 man strong Second Division, although better equipped and numerically superior, was less efficient than the Eritrean police. It was mostly composed of Ethiopians from the provinces outside of Eritrea, the Ethiopian soldiers lacked knowledge of the area and of the people. Their normal tactics were to burn villages, shoot suspects and destroy livestock—the traditional Ethiopian response to dissidence.

=== 1970s ===
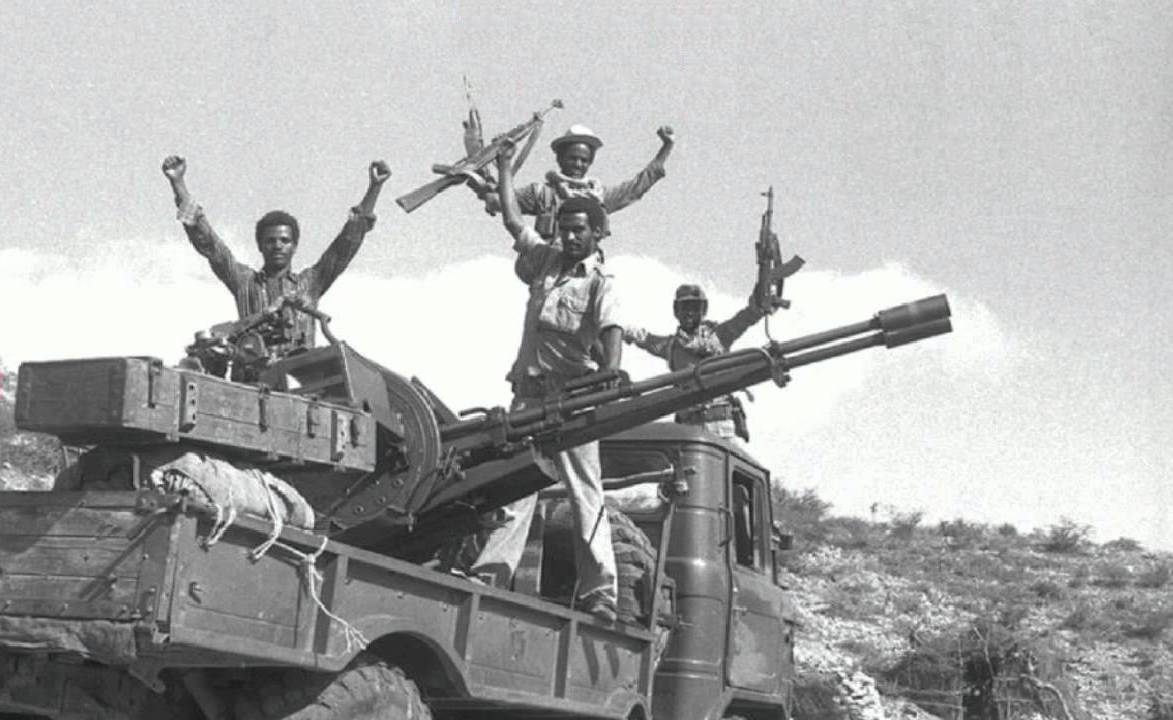
EPLF fighters standing on top of a GAZ-66 gun truck after battle of Nakfa

In 1970, members of the ELF had a falling out, and three smaller groups broke away from the group to form the Popular Liberation Forces (PLF) jointly represent by Osman Saleh Sabbe. The first group, led by Romodan Mohammed Nur, was made up of Tigre fighters who felt pushed aside by the Beni Amer dominated leadership of the ELF. The second led by Isaias Afwerki, was composed of Christian fighters who broke off from the ELF in 1969 due to their pro-Arab and Islamist stance. The third and final group led by former Sudanese army NCO Abu Tayyara, was called the Obel Group, and consisted of long-time veterans who resented the decline of their power in the ELF, and broke off due to personal ambitions. In August 1973, the leaders of the first two groups agreed to join together to form the Eritrean People's Liberation Front (EPLF). The leader of the umbrella organization was Secretary-General of the EPLF Romodan Mohammed Nur, while the Assistant Secretary-General was Isaias Afewerki. The EPLF began to fight a bitter civil war against the ELF. The two organizations were forced by popular will to reconcile in 1975 and participate in joint operations against Ethiopia. The ELF was supported diplomatically and militarily by various countries, particularly China, which supplied the ELF with weapons and training until 1972, when Ethiopia recognized Beijing as the legitimate government of China.

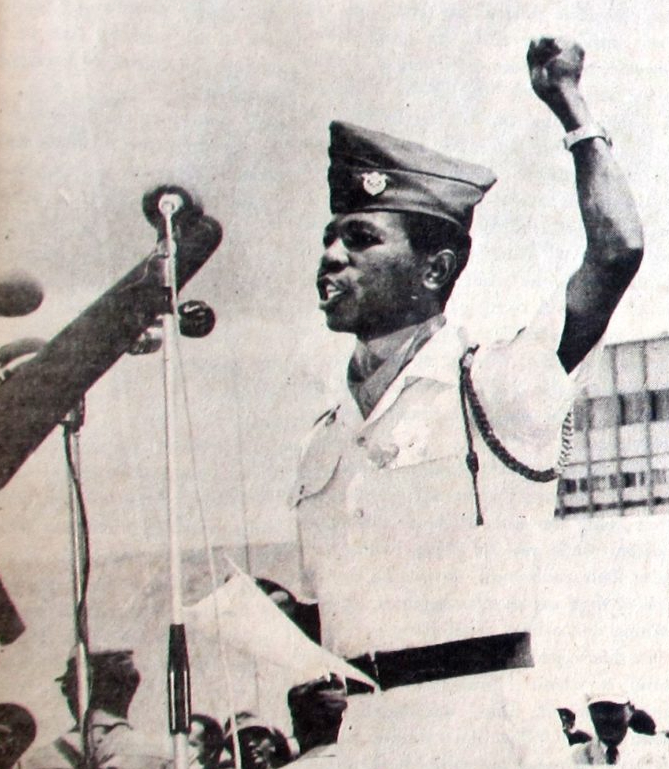
Mengistu Haile Mariam speech. He became dictator and undisputed leader of Ethiopia in 1977, continuing a brutal campaign to suppress Eritrean separatism.

In 1974, Emperor Haile Selassie was ousted in a coup. The collapse of the Ethiopian Empire coincided with the end of the Eritrean civil war. The new Ethiopian government, called the Derg, was a Marxist military junta. Between June and mid-November 1974, the Derg, then under the control of the Eritrean-born General Aman Andom, declared a cease-fire in Eritrea. The cease-fire aimed to persuade Eritreans to lay down their arms and find a political solution to the conflict. Despite this, conflicting policies emerged within the Ethiopian leadership: one advocating for a military solution in Eritrea and the other supporting a political solution by granting substantial concessions to the Eritreans. However, the assassination of Andom and other officials by the Derg regime on November 24, 1974, marked the end to the pursuit of a political resolution. Subsequently, under Vice Chairman Lt. Colonel Mengistu Haile Mariam, the Ethiopian government shifted towards pacifying the Eritreans with brute force. This shift led to a period of terror in Asmara, with more than 50 individuals killed by the military by the end of 1974, fostering an atmosphere of fear.

In 1975, the Derg dispatched a peasant army of 100,000 to crush the Eritrean rebels. The army was largely routed after it had crossed into Eritrea. In the ensuing years the Derg suffered back-to-back defeats against the insurgency. During this time, the Derg could not control the population by force alone. To supplement its garrisons, forces were sent on missions to instill fear in the population, including massacres which took place in primarily Muslim parts of Eritrea, including the villages of She'eb, Hirgigo, Elabared, and the town of Om Hajer; massacres also took place in predominantly Christian areas as well. The advent of these brutal killings of civilians regardless of race, religion, or class was the final straw for many Eritreans who were not involved in the war, and at this point many either fled the country or went to the front lines.

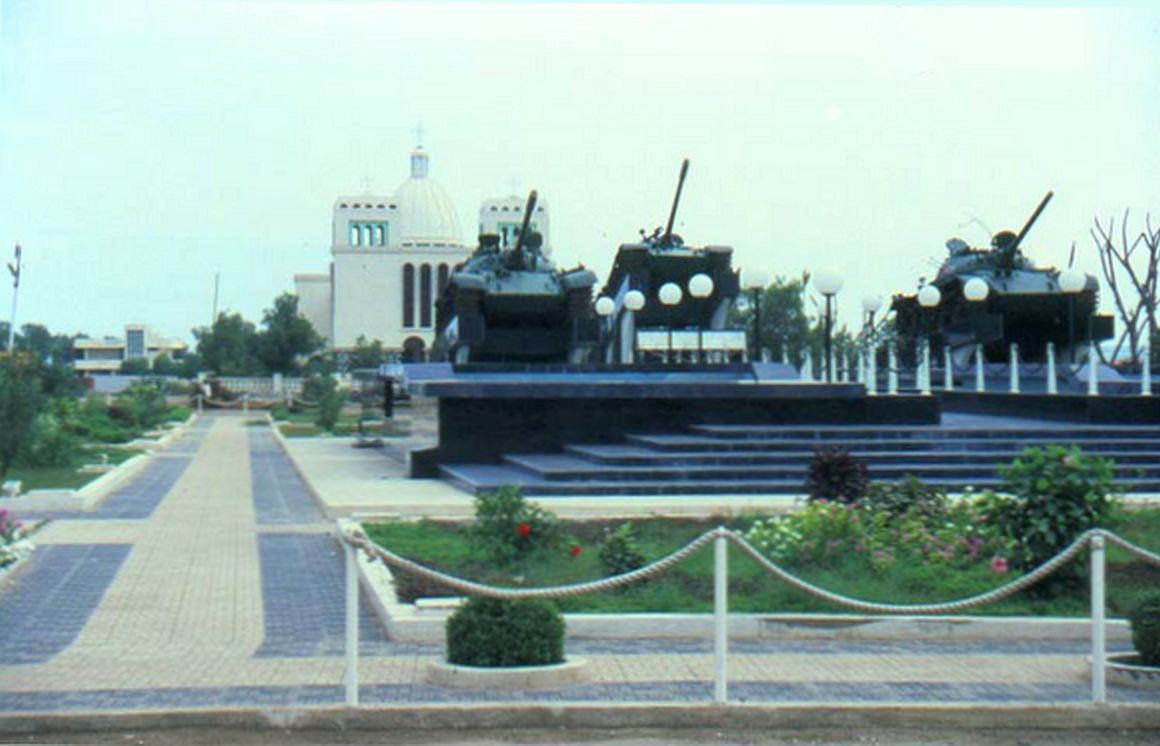
The war memorial square in Massawa, Eritrea

From 1975 to 1977, the ELF and EPLF outnumbered the Ethiopian army, and managed to overrun an Ethiopian garrison at the Siege of Nakfa. This heavily demoralized the Ethiopian garrisons throughout Eritrea and within the next few months, the EPLF took control of Afabet, Keren, Elabored, and Dekemhare. Similarly, the ELF seized control of Omhajer, Teseney, Agordat, Mendefera, and Adi Quala. All of Eritrea was liberated with the exception of Asmara, Massawa, Assab and Barentu.

In 1977 the Eritrean insurgency had taken advantage of the Derg's preoccupation with war for the Ogaden against the Western Somali Liberation Front and Somali National Army. Immediately after the Ogaden War ended, the Ethiopian army, with Cuban support, reoriented to Eritrea and forced the ELF and EPLF out of many areas they had liberated in the prior months. Using the considerable manpower and military hardware available from the Somali campaign, the Ethiopian Army regained the initiative. Notable military engagements occurred in this period such as the Siege of Barentu and the First Battle of Massawa. The Eritreans would not regain the initiative until 1984.

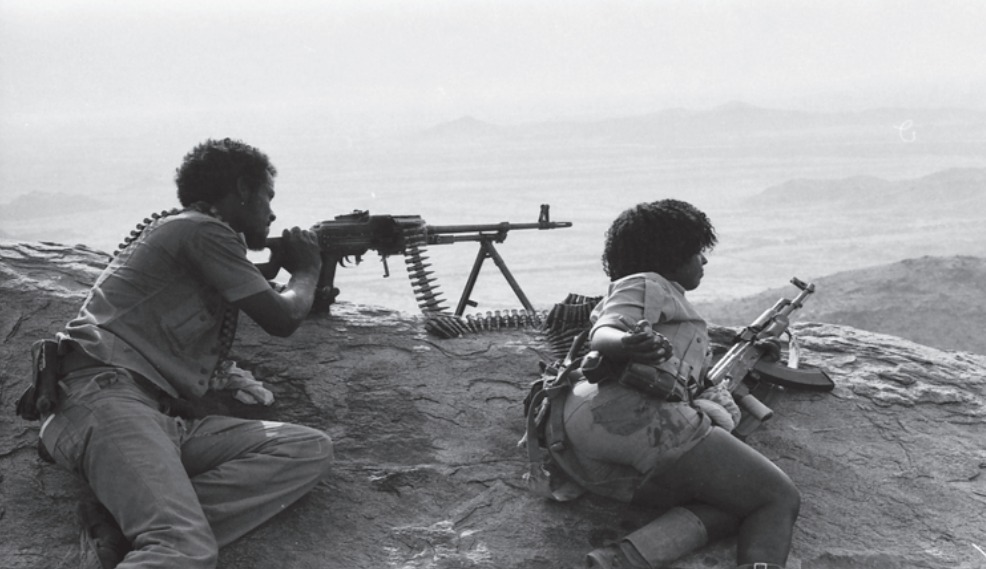
EPLF fighters in the early 1980s.

In May 1978, using a newly completed airfield in Mekelle in neighboring Tigray, the Ethiopian Air Force began a campaign of saturation bombing of positions in Eritrea held by the ELF and EPLF. While many of the targets hit were military, the bombers also attacked towns, villages and animal herds. The ground offensive started in July, and in a few weeks captured all the towns that the ELF and EPLF had held in southern and central Eritrea. The second offensive began in November 1978, aimed at the relief of Massawa and the recapture of Keren. An even larger army was deployed, including large contingents of armor. On November 25–26, there was a huge two-day battle with the EPLF at Elabored, which ended inconclusively. However, the EPLF was badly mauled and decided to abandon Keren and the nearby towns, and withdraw to the mountains of Sahel, where the terrain was appropriate for a last stand. This was called the "strategic withdrawal." The ELF, which had taken the brunt of the first offensive, refused to pull out of the newly liberated areas. By continuing to engage the Ethiopian army, rather than retreat, the ELF ensured its military defeat.

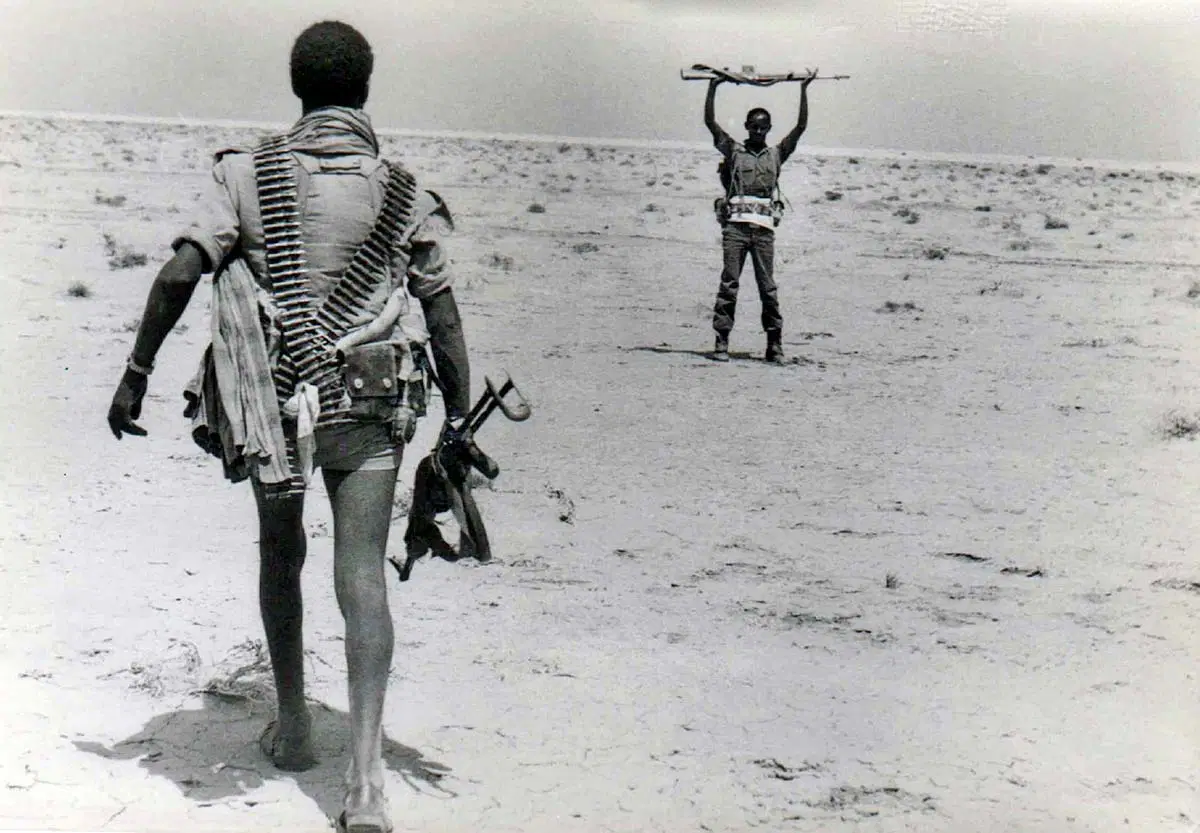
An Ethiopian soldier surrendering to an EPLF fighter.

The third offensive took place in January–February 1979, and consisted in a three-pronged attack on Nakfa, the headquarters of Sahel district, where the EPLF had set up its "liberated area" and was beginning to construct defensive lines. More areas were evacuated in the face of the assault, and the EPLF was able to dismantle and remove the infrastructure more systematically.

The fourth offensive was launched towards Nakfa in March 1979, the fifth offensive was then launched in July. The army Chief of Staff wrote a newspaper article anticipating total victory, entitled: "Days of remnants of secessionist bandits lurking in bushes numbered." Over 50,000 troops were deployed in the attacks, together with large amounts of armor. Most of the attacks were destroyed well short of their target. Between July 14 and 22, the army lost an estimated 6,000 dead while the guerrillas lost around 2,500.

Another offensive, launched towards Nakfa in December 1979, ended in a disaster and rout for government forces. The EPLF was able to counter-attack and push the army back as far as its headquarters at Afabet.

=== 1980s ===
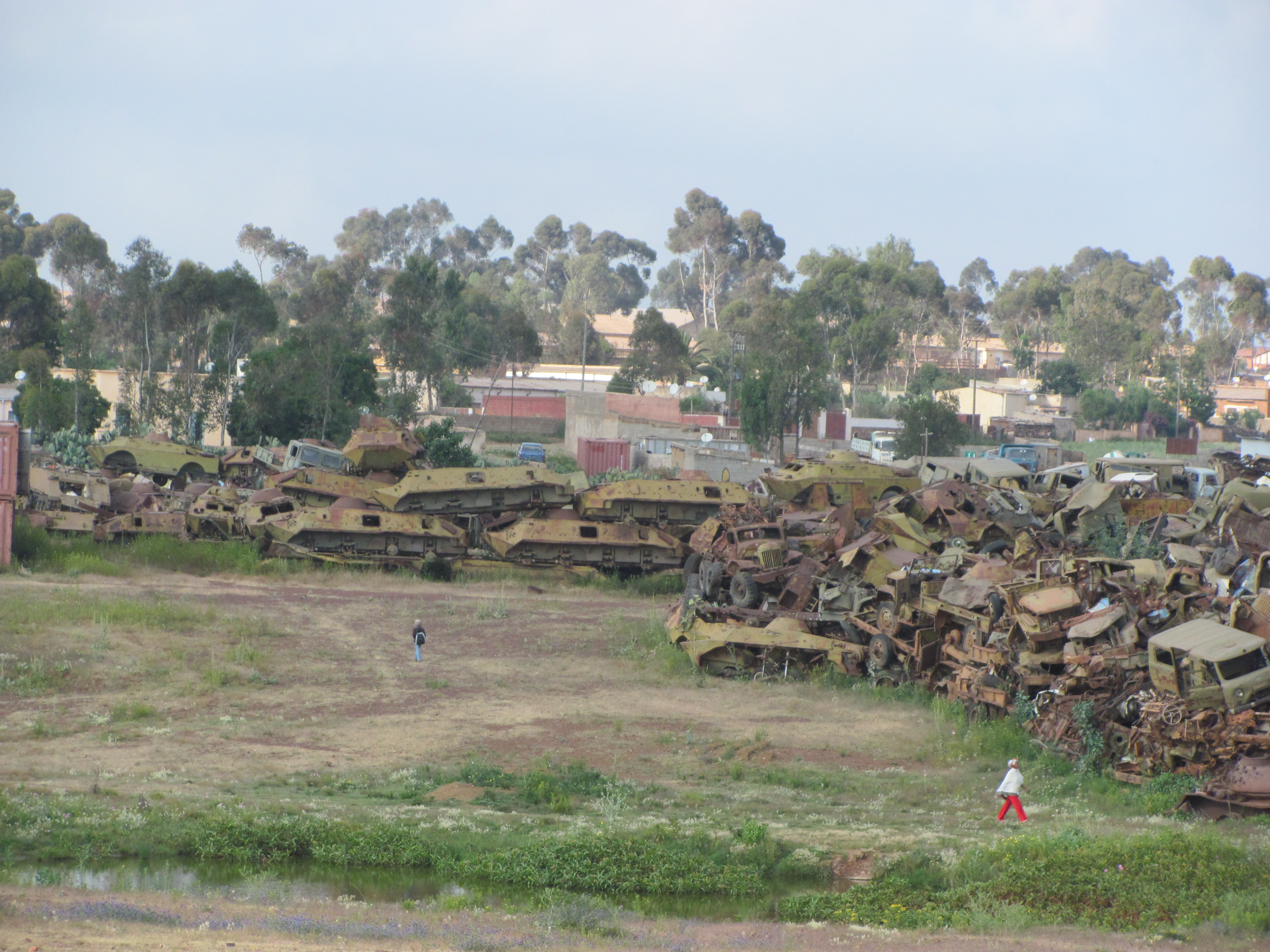
Wider view of the Asmara tank graveyard

In December 1980, the government launched a relatively small attack, which petered out without military gains to either side. 1981 passed without a major military offensive.

The alliance between the EPLF and the ELF which had held since 1975 began to break, and quickly developed into an irrevocable split. There were some armed clashes between the groups, for instance in August 1980, but large-scale civil war was avoided in part because of military weakness of the ELF. The Tigrayan People's Liberation Front (TPLF) assisted the EPLF in its attacks on ELF positions. Most of the ELF fighters retreated into Sudan, where they were detained and disarmed by the Sudanese government. The last major group arrived in Karakon, eastern Sudan, in 1981.

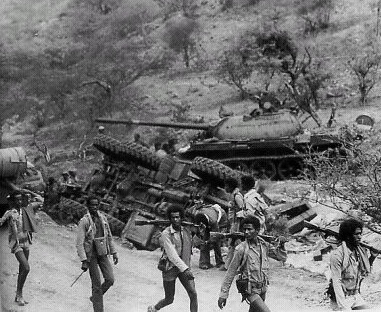
Destroyed Ethiopian tanks and EPLF militants.

After the comparative lull of 1980–81, 1982 was to be the worst year of war in Eritrea to date, in which the government made an all-out attempt to crush the EPLF. It was named the Red Star Campaign in response to the planned US "Bright Star" exercises in the Middle East. Mengistu Haile Mariam then went to Asmara to personally oversee the offensive himself. The Red Star Campaign involved the largest number of troops ever deployed in Eritrea—more than 80,000 were involved in the attacks on the EPLF base areas. The forcefully conscripted soldiers in the Ethiopian ranks were used for massive assaults on the EPLF positions around Nakfa, in the hope that sheer weight of numbers would overrun the rebel lines. The offensive involved an unprecedented use of air power and toxic gas. The EPLF had to equip its fighters with homemade gas masks. Despite inflicting devastating casualties on the EPLF, the Ethiopians failed to breakthrough the rebel lines. The Red Star offensive failed. By May 1982, it had failed to capture Nakfa, and it was unofficially abandoned on June 20. The EPLF was even able to counter-attack and push government lines back. Having been launched with huge publicity, the offensive ended in complete silence from the government media.

In 1983, the government launched an offensive in March on the Halhal front, north of Keren. Known as the "Stealth Offensive" because of the lack of publicity surrounding it, government forces succeeded in overrunning EPLF lines, but not in inflicting a significant defeat on the rebels. By this point, Ethiopian forces had suffered 90,000 casualties.

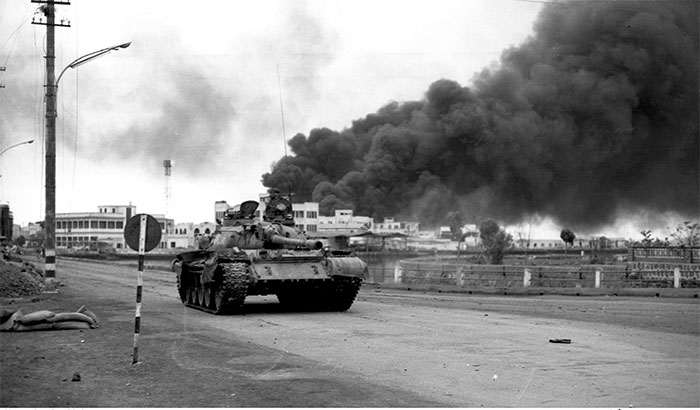
Abandoned T-55 tank of the Ethiopian army, end of 1980s.

In early 1984, the EPLF went on the offensive, making some significant gains. The government responded by another round of aerial bombardment, and by an offensive launched on 27 October which inflicted heavy casualties on the Eritreans and forced them to retreat back to their original lines.

In the summer of 1985, the EPLF again went on the offensive and expelled the Ethiopians from the town of Barentu. The Derg then sent freshly conscripted recruits and threw them at the entrenched Eritreans to force them out of Barentu, the result was a costly victory for the Ethiopians as they were able to push out the Eritreans but not after taking significant casualties.

In 1986, the Derg launched the "Red Sea Offensive" and attacked the frontlines of the EPLF with the aim of capturing Nakfa. Despite extensive air support and the use of airborne troops in the Sahel, the Ethiopians were repelled. As insurgencies in Tigray, Wollo and other parts of Ethiopia began to grow worse, the government no longer had the resources to conduct massive offensives in Eritrea and had to focus on other regions as well.

In 1988, with the Battle of Afabet, the EPLF captured Afabet and its surroundings, then headquarters of the Ethiopian Army in northeastern Eritrea, prompting the Ethiopian Army to withdraw from its garrisons in Tessenei, Barentu and Agordat leaving all of western and northern Eritrea into EPLF hands. EPLF fighters then moved into position around Keren, Eritrea's second-largest city.

=== 1990s ===
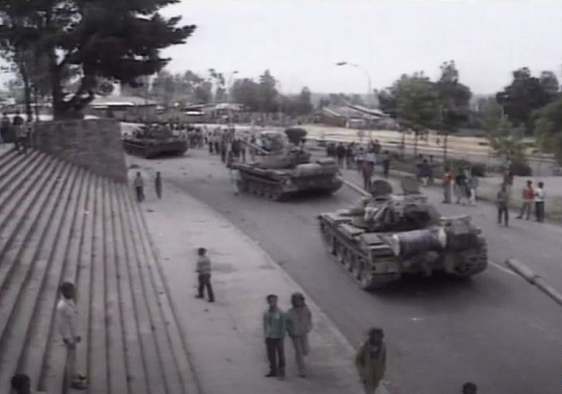
Rebel tanks in Ethiopian capital, Addis Abeba.

The Soviet Union informed Mengistu that it would not be renewing its defence and cooperation agreement. With the cessation of Soviet support and supplies, the Ethiopian Army's morale plummeted, and the EPLF, along with other Ethiopian rebel forces, began to advance on Ethiopian positions.

In February 1990, the EPLF launched Operation Fenkil to capture the city of Massawa. The Ethiopian garrison initially put up fierce resistance until the EPLF used naval units to flak the Ethiopians. The Eritreans were able to overcome the Ethiopian defences and capture the city. Following the capture of Massawa by the EPLF, the Ethiopian government launched a devastating air raid on the city. The use of cluster bombs killed hundreds of civilians.

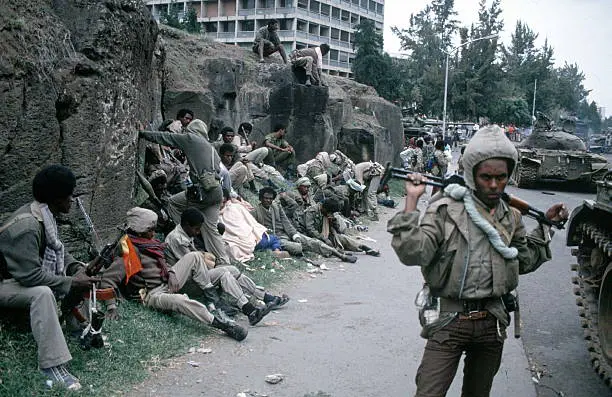
EPDRF fighters in Addis Abeba.

In 1991, the Ethiopian People's Revolutionary Democratic Front (EPRDF) had begun advancing towards the capital, forcing Mengistu Haile Mariam to flee the country. By May 1991, the rebels had captured Addis Ababa and overthrown the government. Around the same time, the Ethiopian garrison in Asmara disintegrated, with tens of thousands of fighters surrendering or deserting, allowing the EPLF fighters to enter the city on May 24. The last battle took place on May 25 in Assab, when the EPLF defeated the last remnants of government loyalists.

== Foreign backing ==
The Ethiopian central government and the Eritrean insurgency received varying levels of foreign support throughout the war for independence.

=== Support to Ethiopia ===
Israel provided significant military assistance against the Eritreans. In the early 1960s, it began supporting campaigns against the ELF. Israel trained counter-insurgency forces and the Ethiopian Governor General of Eritrea, Asrate Medhin Kassa, had an Israeli Military Attaché as his advisor. An Israeli colonel was put in charge of an Ethiopian military training school at Decamare. The Ethiopian–Israeli cooperation had impacts on the discourse of the Eritrean rebel movements, which increasingly began to use anti-Zionist rhetoric. It also enabled the Eritreans to mobilize material support from the Arab and Islamic world. The Israeli perception of the war in Eritrea as part of the Arab–Israeli conflict was reinforced when reports of links between the ELF and Palestine Liberation Organization emerged after the Six-Day War.

The United States assisted the government of Haile Selassie in suppressing domestic insurgencies from the 1960s up until the Ethiopian Revolution when support was withdrawn.

The Soviet Union and Cuba also participated in counter insurgency operations in Eritrea, which proved to be particularly embarrassing to the Marxist-Leninist and anti-American EPLF. After the Ogaden War with the WSLF and Somalia, the Cubans and Soviets provided arms, training, advice and planning to assist the Ethiopian effort to crush the Eritrean resistance. Soviet support proved instrumental in the capture of major cities in the late 1970s.

=== Support to Eritrea ===
Numerous Arab countries and organizations such as Iraq, Syria, Libya and the Palestinian Liberation Organization (PLO) provided varying levels of support to the ELF and EPLF. While Syria had been an early supporter, it could spare little following the Six Day War of 1967. The PLO trained ELF forces abroad in various Arab countries such as Jordan and Lebanon. Following Muammar Gaddafi's rise to power, Libya became a significant backer of the EPLF until the Ethiopian Revolution in 1974. Iraq provided training to Eritrean students living in the country.

Sudan provided significant assistance to the Eritreans, though it greatly varied over time as different governments held power. Following the toppling of Sudanese dictator Ibrahim Abboud support to the ELF steadily increased, occasionally receiving direct although modest support. After the 1969 Sudanese coup d'état material assistance became significant as Khartoum allowed the Iraqis, the PLO and other friendly Arabs provide arms to the Eritreans through their territory. Border clashes broke out between Sudan and Ethiopia. By the mid-1970s support had been greatly reduced.

Somalia was a highly vocal supporter of the ELF and EPLF. According to Eritrean accounts, Somali assistance during the conflict essentially consisted of moral, political and diplomatic support. Material support from the Somalis has been described by scholars as, "practically meaningless" and "very limited". The ELF had opened an office in Mogadishu during 1963 and Somali radio was the principle foreign media backer of the Eritrean cause during the early years. The EPLF did not develop close ties to the Barre regime, though EPLF members like Isaias Afwerki travelled abroad on Somali passports.

== Peace talks ==
The former President of the United States, Jimmy Carter, with the help of some U.S. government officials and United Nations officials, attempted to mediate in peace talks with the EPLF, hosted by the Carter Presidential Center in Atlanta, Georgia in September 1989. Ashagre Yigletu, Deputy Prime Minister of the People's Democratic Republic of Ethiopia (PDRE), helped negotiate and signed a November 1989 peace deal with the EPLF in Nairobi, along with Jimmy Carter and Al-Amin Mohamed Seid. However, soon after the deal was signed, hostilities resumed. Yigletu also led the Ethiopian government delegations in peace talks with the TPLF leader Meles Zenawi in November 1989 and March 1990 in Rome. He also attempted again to lead the Ethiopian delegation in peace talks with the EPLF in Washington, D.C. until March 1991.

== Recognition ==
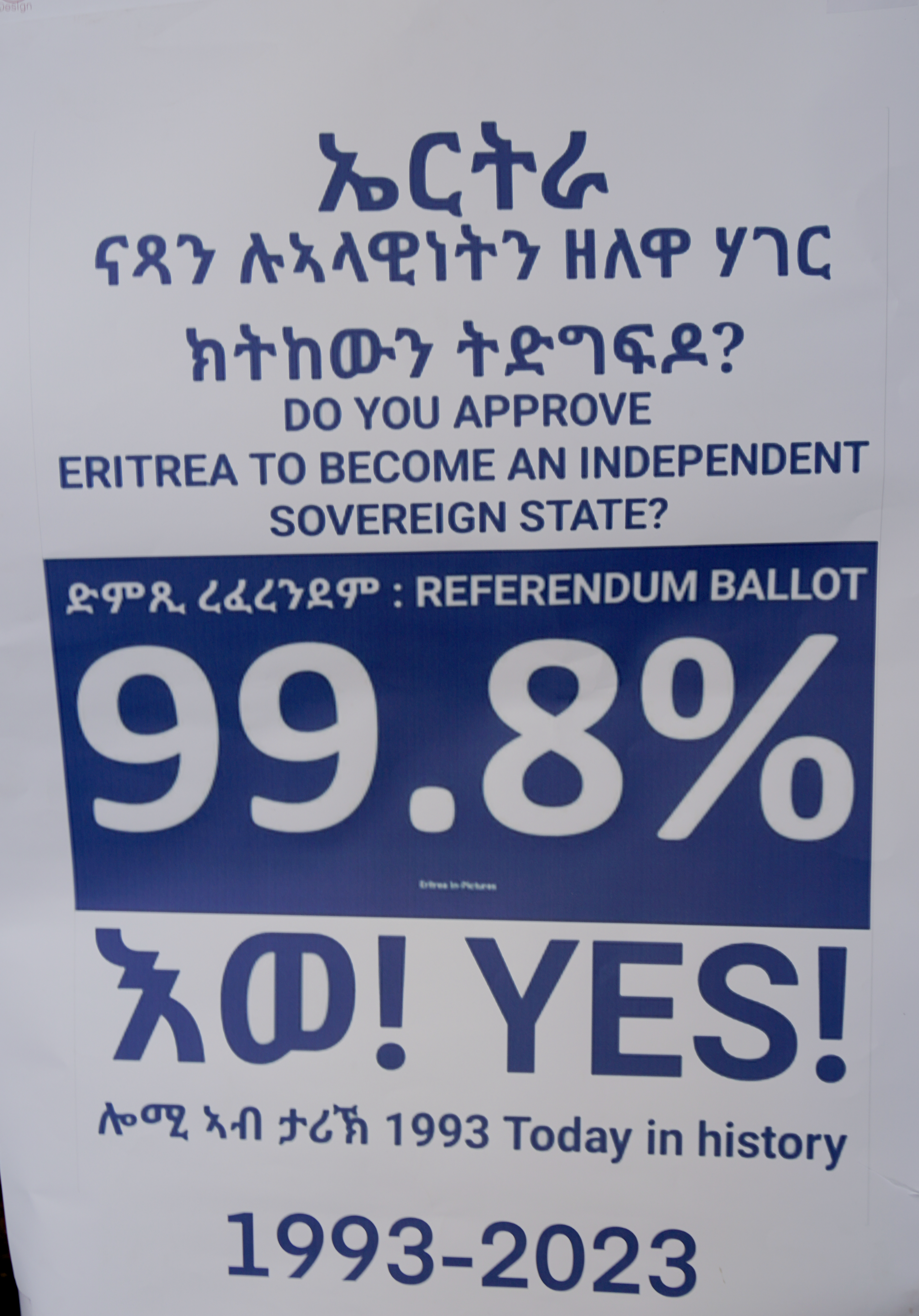
Commemorative poster in 2023, celebrating the anniversary of Eritrea's vote for independence

After the end of the Cold War, the United States played a facilitative role in the peace talks in Washington, D.C. during the months leading up to the May 1991 fall of the Mengistu regime. In mid-May, Mengistu resigned as head of the Ethiopian government and went into exile in Zimbabwe, leaving a caretaker government in Addis Ababa. A high-level U.S. delegation was present in Addis Ababa for the 1–5 July 1991 conference that established a transitional government in Ethiopia. Having defeated the Ethiopian forces in Eritrea, the EPLF attended as an observer and held talks with the new TPLF-led transitional government regarding Eritrea's relationship to Ethiopia. The outcome of those talks was an agreement in which the Ethiopians recognized the right of the Eritreans to hold a referendum on independence. The referendum was held in April 1993 and the Eritrean people voted almost unanimously in favour of independence, with the integrity of the referendum being verified by the UN Observer Mission to Verify the Referendum in Eritrea (UNOVER). On 28 May 1993, the United Nations formally admitted Eritrea to its membership. Below are the results from the referendum:

Choice	Votes	%
Yes	1,100,260	99.83
No	1,822	0.17
Invalid/blank votes	328	-
Total	1,102,410	100
Registered voters/turnout	1,156,280	98.52
Source: African Elections Database

Referendum results
Region	Do you want Eritrea to be an independent and sovereign country?			Total
Region	Yes	No	uncounted	Total
Asmara	128,443	144	33	128,620
Barka	4,425	47	0	4,472
Denkalia	25,907	91	29	26,027
Gash-Setit	73,236	270	0	73,506
Hamasien	76,654	59	3	76,716
Akkele Guzay	92,465	147	22	92,634
Sahel	51,015	141	31	51,187
Semhar	33,596	113	41	33,750
Seraye	124,725	72	12	124,809
Senhit	78,513	26	1	78,540
Freedom fighters	77,512	21	46	77,579
Sudan	153,706	352	0	154,058
Ethiopia	57,466	204	36	57,706
Other	82,597	135	74	82,806
%	99.79	0.17	0.03	

== See also ==
- Eritrean Civil Wars
- List of massacres committed during the Eritrean War of Independence
