= Petros Solomon =

Eritrean military officer and politician (born 1951)

1st Minister of Defence of Eritrea
- In office 1993–1994
- Succeeded by: Mesfin Hagos

Minister of Foreign Affairs of Eritrea
- In office 1994–1997
- Preceded by: Mahmoud Ahmed Sherifo
- Succeeded by: Haile Woldense

2nd Minister of Marine Resources of Eritrea
- In office 1997–2001
- Preceded by: Saleh Meki
- Succeeded by: Ahmed Haj Ali

Personal details
- Born: May 5, 1951 (age 75) Asmara, British Military Administration in Eritrea
- Party: PFDJ
- Spouse: Aster Yohannes

Military service
- Allegiance: EPLF (1972–1991); Eritrea (1991–2001)
- Branch/service: Eritrean Army
- Years of service: 1972–2001
- Battles/wars: Ethiopian Civil War; Eritrean War of Independence; Siege of Nakfa; First Battle of Massawa; Siege of Barentu; Red Star Campaign; Battle of Afabet; Second Battle of Massawa; Hanish Islands conflict; Eritrean–Ethiopian War

Petros Solomon (Tigrinya: ጴጥሮስ ሰሎሞን; born 5 May 1951) is an Eritrean former military officer and politician. He served as a paramilitary commander of the Eritrean People's Liberation Front (EPLF) during the Eritrean War of Independence, where he played key role. Following the independence of Eritrea, he served in several positions in Eritrean government, including Minister of Defense and Minister of Foreign Affairs.

He has been imprisoned in an undisclosed location since September 2001 for opposing the rule of President Isaias Afewerki. Amnesty International has named him a prisoner of conscience.

== Early life ==
Solomon was born in a recognized family in Asmara. He completed his early education in Asmara and Addis Ababa. He was attending the Haile Selassie University in 1972, when he joined EPLF. He is married to Aster Yohannes, who joined the front in 1972. The pair have four children, Simon, the twins Zerai and Hanna, and Meaza. The pair fought in the independence struggle with Ethiopia, in which the EPLF gained de facto independence for Eritrea in 1991.

== The Eritrean War of Independence ==
Petros Solomon was a member of the Eritrean People's Liberation Front (EPLF). From 1972 until the end of the Eritrean War of Independence in 1991, he served as Chief Strategist and the head of Military Intelligence (Brigade 72) of the EPLF. He also served as a member of the executive committee (Politburo) of EPLF from 1977 to 1994. During the War of Independence, he is credited with having single-handedly organized the EPLF's intelligence section. He is also credited with having been the commander of the Nakfa, Kerkebet and Zara fronts during the Red Star Campaign in the early 1980s. He also, along with Ogbe Abraha, led the battle to liberate the town of Barentu in 1987. In 1990, he commanded the EPLF army that captured Massawa during Operation Fenkil, which destroyed the backbone of the Ethiopian army in Eritrea. In its June 16, 1991 publication, The New York Times stated that after the fall of Asmara, "Petros Solomon, was running the city until the arrival of Isaias Afewerki".

== After Eritrean independence ==
Following independence, Petros Solomon served in various cabinet positions. He served as the first Minister of Defense of Eritrea. In mid-February 1997, he was moved from the post of Minister of Foreign Affairs to that of Minister of Marine Resources.

During his time as a Minister of Marine Resources, "he independently conceived of a biosaline agriculture as a way of building the economy of the country and gave enthusiastic support to Manzanar Project".

=== Arrest ===
In September 2001 he was detained indefinitely along with other politicians who were known as the G-15, a group which opposes the rule of Eritrean president Isaias Afewerki. Solomon along with 15 other ministers were arrested by the ruling front and detained in unknown location ever since. The ministers were criticizing the border war of the then president, Isaias and signed an open letter. He was fired along with other opposing members and was detained on 18 September 2001. He has not been seen or heard from since. He was considered a prisoner of conscience by Amnesty International.

Dan Connell made an observation that, "It was inevitable he would clash with Isaias Afewerki". After Petros's detention many of his former subordinates who publicly opposed his arrest were themselves arrested as a result, including Kidane Wedi Qeshi who used to be Communications Operator for Petros Solomon, Mehari (last name unknown) who was Chauffeur for Petros Solomon, Tesfai "Gomorra" Gebreab who was a close friend of Petros Solomon. Tsedal Yohannes, the sister of Petros Solomon's wife, has been fighting against the Eritrean government about the status of her sister and her husband ever since from London.

== Personal life ==
His wife Aster Yohannes, who was also a freedom fighter and member of EPLF, was detained by security personnel at Asmara International Airport in the capital Asmara on December 11, 2003, when she returned after a three-year period of study at the University of Phoenix to unite with her children. She is imprisoned at Carshel in Asmara Eritrea. All four of Solomon's children live in exile.
