= Army of the Derg =

Military force of Ethiopia's Derg regime (1974–1991)

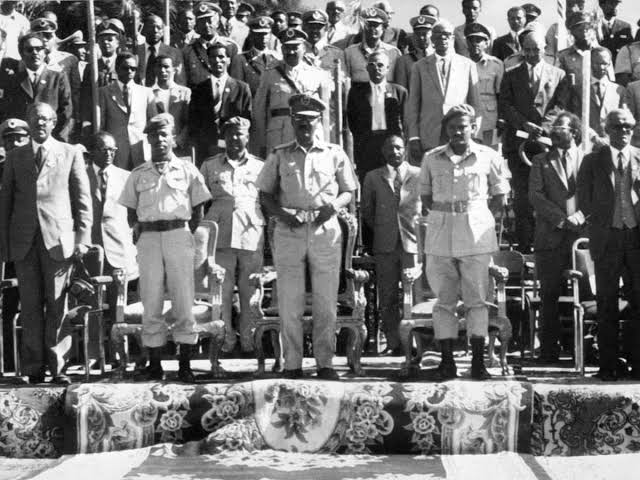
- The Derg as Coordinated Committee of the Armed Forces during the Ethiopian Revolution in 1974
- Founded: 21 June 1974; 52 years ago
- Disbanded: 28 May 1991
- Service branches: Navy; Air Force; Ground Force
- Headquarters: Addis Ababa, Ethiopia

Leadership
- Commander-in-Chief: Major Mengistu Haile Mariam (1974-1991)

Personnel
- Conscription: 18
- Active personnel: 388,000 (1974-1991)

Related articles
- History: Ethiopian Civil War: Battle of Tiro (1974); Ogaden War (1977-1978); Siege of Barentu (1977-1978); Red Star Campaign (1982); Fall of Addis Ababa (1991); Eritrean war of independence Ogaden War

The Army of the Derg, formed from officers of the Imperial Ethiopian Army, drew primarily from four divisions: Division I (Imperial Guard, Addis Ababa), Division II (counter-insurgency, Eritrea), Division III (mechanized, Harar), and Division IV (Addis Ababa, overseeing southwestern Ethiopia).

Influenced by the 1960s student movement, the army reflected three sociopolitical classes: senior officers (military upper class), junior and intermediate officers (military middle class, often in their 20s–30s, acting as civil intelligentsia), and rank-and-file with NCOs, addressing socioeconomic unrest. Officers were predominantly Amhara (80% of generals, 65% of colonels), followed by Tigreans, Oromos, Gurage, and a few Muslims.

== Background ==
The Derg army emerged from several army officers divisions splintered from the Ethiopian Empire Army. By the 1960s, these divisions were based in Debre Zeyit (Air Force) and small naval unit in Asmara. The Division I, also known as the imperial guard, was based in Addis Ababa, safeguarding the imperial Haile Selassie's officials; Division II – based in Asmara – tasked to subdue Eritrean separatists; Division III – a mechanized Harar unit – used to combat Somali forces in the east; and the Division IV was based in Addis Ababa to supervise the situation of southwestern Ethiopia.

The 1960s student movement shaped three sociopolitical classes pivotal to the revolution:

- Senior officers, led by colonels.
- Junior and intermediate officers, functioning as civil intelligentsia.
- Rank-and-file and NCOs, tackling socioeconomic challenges.

== 1974- ==
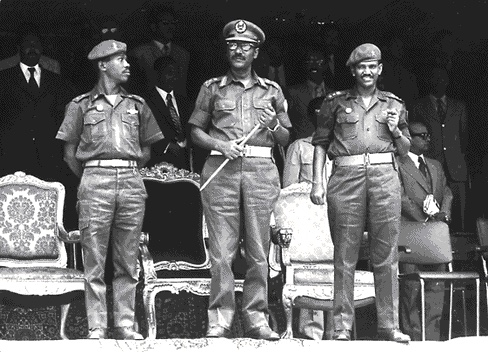
Derg members

In February 1974, the “February Movement” saw NCOs protest without institutional impact. On February 25, Division II’s Eritrean privates and NCOs arrested high-ranking government officers, followed by Divisions I and IV in Addis Ababa. The Massawa-based navy forced Admiral Iskinder Desta to flee to Djibouti and later Addis Ababa, while Division III in Harar remained inactive. In June 1974, the Coordinating Committee of the Armed Forces, Police, and Territorial Army (Derg) formed under General Aman Andom, drawing from Imperial Army divisions. Facing internal divisions and external opposition, the Derg recruited peasants. Amid the 1973 economic recession, NCO monthly salaries rose by $200–300, tax-free, addressing rising prices, food security, pensions, and judicial inequities. A 1975 Derg booklet noted officers swore secrecy under the emperor, a practice continued under the regime.

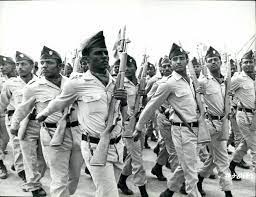
Ethiopian army parade

During the Ethiopian Revolution, the army grew rapidly, with high-ranking officers profiting from World War II experience. Predominantly Amhara, with Tigreans, Oromos, Gurage, and a few Muslims, the army reached 250,000 troops by 1980, consuming 50–70% of Ethiopia’s budget since 1978. The Derg also formed civilian militias: People’s Militia (150,000 fighters in 1980) and People’s Protection Brigades. After the Derg’s fall in 1991, the army, reduced to 45,000 troops, disbanded.
