= Battle of Massawa =

Battle of Massawa may refer to:

- Battle of Massawa (1541), Ethiopian–Adal War
- Battle of Massawa (1941), World War II
- First Battle of Massawa (1977), Eritrean War of Independence and Ethiopian Civil War
- Second Battle of Massawa (1990), Eritrean War of Independence
