= Siege of Barentu =

1977 battle of the Eritrean War of Independence

- Part of the Ethiopian Civil War and Eritrean War of Independence
| Date | September 1977 - August 1978 |
| Location | Barentu, Ethiopia |
| Result | Ethiopian victory |

Belligerents
| EPLF; ELF | Ethiopia |

Commanders and leaders
| Petros Solomon | Merid Negussie |

Casualties and losses
| 550 killed | Unknown |

The siege of Barentu took place in 1977 in and around the town of Barentu. It was jointly laid to siege by the Eritrean Liberation Front (ELF) and the Eritrean People's Liberation Front (EPLF) against the forces of Ethiopia.

== The battle ==
The town of Barentu was defended by a large garrison of Ethiopian troops. The garrison had constructed numerous fortifications to improve the defensibility of the town. Furthermore, a local Kunama militia had been raised to support the Ethiopian troops.

The Ethiopian garrison was reorganized as Task Force 507, while the Ethiopian Air Force deployed their F-5Es in Mekelle and began using their air superiority to their advantage. This close air support inflicted heavy casualties on the forces of the ELF and EPLF who were conducting their first major joint operation. The failure of this joint operation would have significant consequences later in the War of Independence.

On 13 June 1978, the EPLF and the ELF attempted to storm the town of Barentu in a coordinated assault, however this town was situated on high ground and they were soon exposed to heavy firepower. The EPLF lost 150 troops and 1 tank. According to reports, fighting between the ELF and EPLF also happened, and caused around 400 casualties. The EPLF and the ELF would abandon the siege before retreating to Agordat in August 1978.

The failure of the siege and the heavy losses incurred by both the ELF and EPLF forces in this battle, as well as the failure at the First Battle of Massawa, led to the withdrawal of rebel forces.
