= Aster Yohannes =

Eritrean EPLF veteran and activist

Personal details
- Born: Asmara, Maekel
- Spouse: Petros Solomon

Aster Yohannes is a veteran of Eritrean People's Liberation Front (EPLF) and an independence activist. Post-independence, she was working in the ministry of Fishery and Marine Resources in 1995. She also is the wife of detained Eritrean politician Petros Solomon.

She was detained by security personnel at Asmara International Airport in the capital Asmara on 11 December 2003, when she returned after a three-year period of study at the University of Phoenix to unite with her children. Her whereabouts has been unknown since then. Petros and Aster had four children.

== Early life ==
Aster Yohannes was doing her Electrical Engineering in Addis Ababa University. During her second year of graduation, she joined the Eritrean People's Liberation Front (EPLF) in 1979. She underwent training for six months and was deputed in combatant. During 1982, she married Petros Solomon, a lead member of the front. The pair had four children Simon, the twins Zerai and Hanna, and Meaza. The pair fought the independence struggle with Ethiopia, which the nation obtained on 1993. During 1995, she was working with the ministry of Fisheries and Marine Resources. She enrolled in Phoenix University during January 2000 to complete her graduation. Back home, in an initiative named G-15, Solomon along with 15 other ministers were arrested by the ruling front and detained in unknown location ever since. The ministers were criticizing the border war of the then president, Isaia and signed an open letter. He was fired along with other opposing members and was detained on 18 September 2001. He was considered a prisoner of conscience by Amnesty International.

On account of the political situation in Eritrea, she obtained visa for her children from the US and sought the Eritrean government to grant them exit to the US. The government denied her pleas.

== Arrest ==
She was detained by security personnel at Asmara International Airport in the capital Asmara on 11 December 2003, when she returned after a three-year period study at the University of Phoenix in Arizona, USA. She had returned to Eritrea with a newly issued Eritrean passport, to be with her four children aged between 6 and 13 at the time of her arrest. During her absence her children had been cared for by her mother-in-law. She has been in prison held in an undisclosed place by the Eritrean government since December 2003. Prior to her departure to Eritrea from the US, she was reportedly given assurances of safety by the then Eritrean Ambassador to the United States Girma Asmerom. The Eritrean authorities have given no reason for her arrest or said where she is held. She was not permitted to meet her family. Amnesty International feared that she could be subject to torture or ill-treatment. Tsedal Yohannes, Aster's sister, has been fighting against the Eritrean government about the status of her sister ever since from London. As of 2016 she was reportedly being held at the Karsheli prison in Asmara.
