= Mesfin Hagos =

Eritrean political leader; founding member of the Eritrean People's Liberation Front

2nd Minister of Defence
- In office 1994–1995
- Preceded by: Petros Solomon
- Succeeded by: Sebhat Ephrem

Personal details
- Born: November 21, 1947 (age 78) Azien, British Military Administration in Eritrea
- Party: PFDJ
- Education: Addis Ababa University (dropped out)

Mesfin Hagos (born 1947) is an Eritrean politician who was one of the founding members of the Eritrean People's Liberation Front (EPLF).

After Independence he was appointed to become Eritrea’s first Minister Minister of Defense during the 1990s. In 1995 he stepped down from his post and became the Regional Administrator of the Southern Region. During the arrest of the G-15 group Mesfin was abroad for medical reasons. He has since lived in exile and sought political asylum in Germany in 2013, where he lived as of December 2020.

== Childhood and education ==
Mesfin was born in the small village of Azien, north of Asmara, on 21 November 19, 1947. He went to secondary school in Debre Berhan and attended the Addis Ababa University until 1966.

== Rebel fighter ==
Mesfin was a founding member of the Eritrean People's Liberation Front (EPLF) in 1973. Before founding that organization, he had joined the Eritrean Liberation Front (ELF) in 1967 as an ordinary member. He eventually became Deputy Commander of ELF Zone 5.

Mesfin Hagos left the ELF in 1970 with Isaias Afwerki, Major General Asmerom Gerezgiher, Solomon Weldemariam, and Tewelde Eyob. Hagos was a part of the founding leadership of the EPLF. Mesfin Hagos briefly served as the Chief of Staff in the EPLF. He was one of the commanders of the Battle of Af'abet that destroyed the backbone of the Ethiopian army.

== Government and exile ==
Popular with the fighters, Mesfin served as the defence minister of Eritrea in the 1990s. He was fired in 2001 for joining the G-15 (Eritrea), but was out of Eritrea for medical treatment and managed to escape detention. In 2013, Mesfin sought asylum in Germany after his colleagues opposing the President were hunted down. As of December 2020, Mesfin lived in Germany.
