= Red Star Campaign =

Operation of the Ethiopian Army

- Part of the Eritrean War of Independence and Ethiopian Civil War
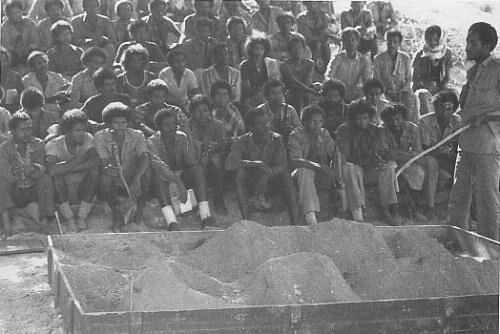
- EPLF militants plan tactics for upcoming battle
Date	February 15 – July 5, 1982
Location	Sahel, Eritrea Province, Ethiopia
Result	EPLF/TPLF victory

Belligerents
Ethiopia	EPLF (Tigray Region) TPLF

Commanders and leaders
Mengistu H. Mariam	Petros Solomon

Strength
84,537 regular troops	22,184 Eritrean guerrillas (including 2,500 Tigrayan guerrillas)

Casualties and losses
10,115 killed 23,313 wounded 3,159 missing	4,000 killed 12,000 wounded 220 captured

Red Star Campaign (Amharic: ቀይ ኮከብ ዘመቻ, romanized: k’eyi kokeb zemecha), officially known as the Red Star Multifaceted Revolutionary Campaign (Amharic: የቀይ ኮከብ ሁለገብ አብዮታዊ ዘመቻ, lit. 'yek’ey kokeb hulegeb ābiyotawī zemecha') was a 1982 Ethiopian Army offensive and operation during the Ethiopian Civil War aimed at eliminating Eritrean separatist forces, specifically the Eritrean People's Liberation Front (EPLF).

From February to June of 1982, more than 80,000 Ethiopian troops attempted to crush the EPLF in a series of offensives. Despite the initial tactical successes of the operation, the government made no significant gains in Eritrea.

Instead of crushing the Eritrean resistance movement, the unsuccessful military operation actually strengthened it, prompting the large segments of the population to rally behind the EPLF with increased fervor. Red Star dealt a personal and political blow to the regime of Mengistu Haile Mariam.

== Background ==
In 1982, the frontline during the Eritrean War of Independence was largely confined to the Sahel region, mostly populated by nomads. The zone was about 26,055km². Between Keren and Algena was Nakfa, the headquarters of the Eritrean People's Liberation Army (EPLA), the paramilitary wing of the EPLF, and symbol of the Eritrean struggle. The Ethiopian government was determined to destroy and capture the headquarters and main stronghold of the Eritrean resistance.

In January 1982, Mengistu Haile Mariam moved the national capital temporarily to Asmara to be able to personally oversee a campaign in the area. By this time, nearly two-thirds of the army was stationed in Eritrea. In a speech on January 25, Mengistu announced the Multifaceted Revolutionary Campaign, and in response to the planned U.S. "Bright Star" exercises in the Middle East, dubbed the forthcoming offensive the "Red Star." The motto became "Military victory first and then civic action". He described the EPLF as "anti-freedom, anti-unity, anti-people and anti-peace bandit gangs" and "the pitiful dregs of history" and confidently predicted their imminent demise.

== Battle ==
The Ethiopian military under the command of Mengistu deployed 10 divisions along three fronts of the Sahel. These divisions consisted of 84,537 combatants, 55 aircraft, 131 tanks, 162 armored cars, 102 infantry vehicles, 499 field artillery, 48 rocket launchers, 873 mortars, 691 antiaircraft guns (used against hillside redoubts), 1,349 antitank guns and 7,714 heavy machine guns. The EPLF possessed 22,184 guerrillas (including a contingent of about 2,500 Tigrayans), 19 tanks, 31 armored cars, 28 field artillery, 162 mortars, 45 antiaircraft guns, 387 antitank guns and 384 heavy machine guns.

On February 15, 1982, the Ethiopian military initiated its offensive simultaneously on three fronts. Displaying an air of readiness and supreme confidence, the success of their operational plan hinged on precise coordination. Within the initial 72 hours, all commands seamlessly advanced toward their respective targets. Antonov and MiG aircraft relentlessly pounded EPLF fortifications, while mobile troops and armored columns congregated at the bases of the plateau, ascending narrow valleys to overrun the defenders. Given the mountainous terrain that favored the guerrillas, frontal, flanking, and rear attacks occurred simultaneously. Despite the initial progress, the guerrillas maintained their positions, causing the drive to lose momentum by the fourth day and throwing the assailants off balance.

The first significant setback unfolded on the western front. Mebrek's three divisions, supported by the Sentik Mechanised Brigade and air cover, achieved their initial objectives. However, before consolidation could take place, a counter-attack surged forward. By 10:20 hours on the 16th, the 21st Division seized Kur, while the 24th Division secured several crucial heights. Simultaneously, the 37th Brigade of the Second Division entered Filfil, and the 31st and the Second Paracommando Brigade captured their designated positions. The 21st Division was smashed by the EPLF, who lured it into a trap, resulting it its retreat to Afabet. Responsibility for this set back fell on Colonel Wubishet Mamo, the commanding officer of the 21st Division, who was executed in front of his troops. However, on the same day the 15th Division in the northern front was able to capture Jebel Dambobiet and, with support from the 23rd, cut the rebel supply lines to Sudan. An effective counter attack by the EPLF on the 18th forced the 15th Division to retreat, it then turned on the 23rd, forcing the Ethiopian army to relinquish all the gains they have made in the northern front.

The two-pronged assault initiated by the Ethiopian 3rd and 17th Divisions yielded impressive results in the southern front. The 17th Division executed a deceptive maneuver by advancing towards Alghena parallel to the coast. Suddenly, it sharply turned left, demonstrating extraordinary speed and tactical efficiency. This division launched a surprise attack on the EPLF from the left flank, employing mortars, artillery, and Soviet Katyusha (BM-21 Grad) rocket launchers, also known as 'Stalin's Organs.' This assault was further supported by helicopter-borne firepower and air strikes. The Eritreans, caught off guard, may have incurred significant losses, potentially marking their heaviest casualties thus far. The 17th division registered its first major victory by seizing the key point of Rora Tselim where it was able to prevent the guerrillas in the northern zone from linking up with those in the south. From there, it advanced toward the mountain-ringed stronghold of Nakfa, fighting off counter-attacks by day and night. By February 1982, the 17th Division had moved managed to reach within 3 kilometers of Nakfa.

However, General Haile Giorgis, who wanted to give the "honor of taking the town" to the 3rd Division (the former division of Mengistu Haile Mariam), ordered the 17th to stop its advance and wait for the 3rd to catch. According to Gebru Tareke, this blunder "deprived the army of a supreme opportunity for finishing off the campaign" and allowed the EPLF to bring in tactical troops from the Jebel Dambobiet. Two days later, the EPLF counter attacked the Ethiopian forces in the hills, finding a gap in the frontlines they made an outflanking operation. Forcing the 3rd Division to conduct an orderly withdrawal, the 17th attempted to reverse the situation and engaged the guerrillas in the mountains, before being encircled. Though the encircled 17th was relieved by two battalions from the 38th Brigade which allowed them to retreat. The EPLF pressed on, and by March 5, 1982, they caught up to the 3rd, attacking its left flank and forcing it to retreat to its pre-offensive position. The commander of the 3rd Division, fearing execution, committed suicide.

Despite this massive setback, the army would not concede defeat. On May 16, 1982, the 21st and 22nd divisions moved south to capture Nakfa, dummies were parachuted behind enemy lines to confuse the guerrillas. The 21st moved towards Kubkub to seize Amba, and 22nd open a frontal assault to seize the heavily defended Hill 782. "Volunteers of Death" were summoned to fight their way to the summit of the hill in fierce close fighting and hand to hand combat, the men, despite their bravery, were virtually annihilated in the fighting. The Ethiopian army launched its fourth and final assault in June of 1982, the 15th Division move south to seize the town of Nakfa, but was repeatedly beaten back, and on July 5, 1982, the army stopped its offensives and began to dig in for defense, thus marking the end of the Red Star offensive.

The Ethiopian army casualties were, 10,115 killed, 23,313 wounded and 3,159 missing, The EPLF has acknowledge around the deaths of 4,000 fighters and three times as many wounded. As a result of poor performance in Red Star, the following August saw a new operation, titled "Red Star II", keep a much lower profile than the original.

== See also ==
- Fall of the Derg
