= Siege of Nakfa =

1977 battle of the Eritrean War of Independence

- Part of the Eritrean War of Independence
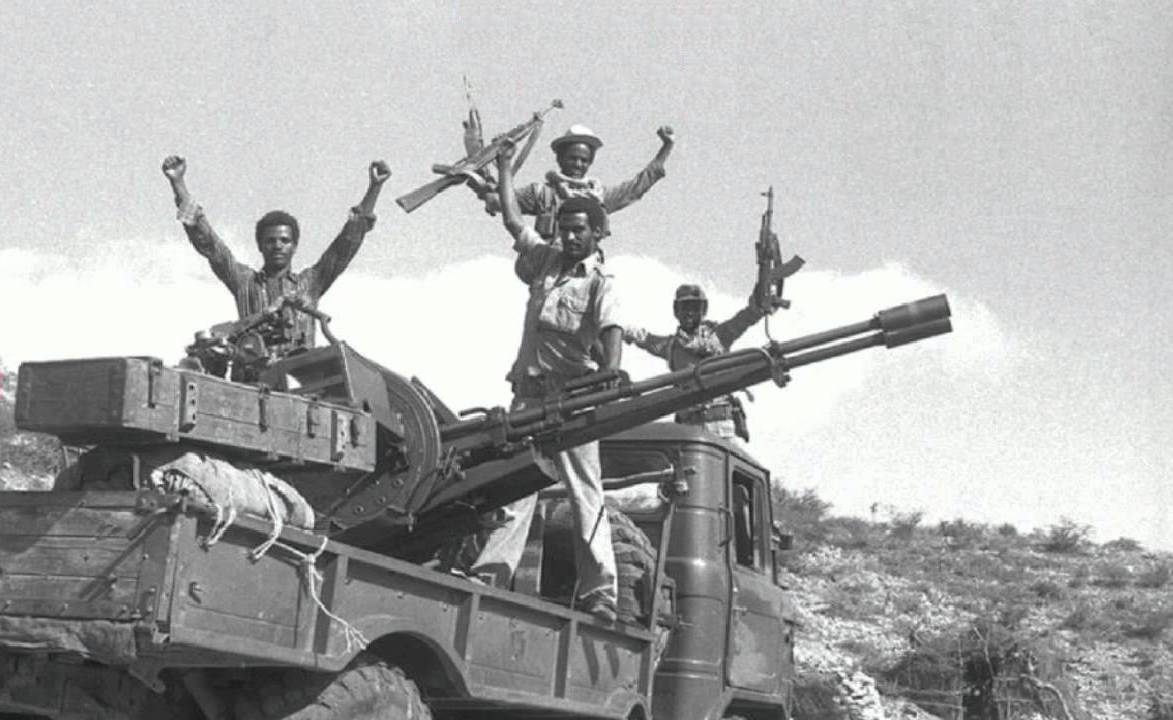
- EPLF fighters on the truck in Nakfa.
Date	17 September 1976 – 22 March 1977
Location	Nakfa, Eritrea Province, Ethiopia
Result	EPLF victory

Belligerents
EPLF	Ethiopia

Commanders and leaders
Isaias Afwerki	Mammo Temtime

Strength
3,000	300

Casualties and losses
Unknown	225 killed

The siege of Nakfa took place in 1977 in and around the town of Nakfa in western Eritrea. It was laid to siege by the Eritrean People's Liberation Front (EPLF) against a small isolated Ethiopian battalion.

== Background ==
In November 1974, following the Ethiopian Revolution and the fall of Haile Selassie's regime a couple of months prior, efforts were initiated to reinforce troops in Eritrea to bolster the stationed army. The Ethiopian 15th Infantry Battalion, which had been deployed in Gojjam, commenced its march to Eritrea, passing through Bahir Dar, Gondar, Adwa, and Mendefera. After engaging with the Eritrean guerrillas near Elabored, the 15th Ethiopian Infantry Battalion headed to Nakfa to replace the Ethiopian 11th Battalion. On its way to Nakfa, the 15th Ethiopian Infantry Battalion overran defenses held by the Eritrean rebels in June 1975.

Upon receiving critical intelligence from the departing unit, the 15th Ethiopian Infantry Battalion initiated strikes against EPLF-held territories, inflicting significant casualties on the guerrillas. In response, the rebels launched a counteroffensive from all directions in September 1975, attempting to overrun Nakfa. However, the Ethiopians defended their positions, repelling the rebels and constructing new trenches and foxholes.

== The siege ==
On September 17, 1976, the rebels launched a significant close-in offensive against Nakfa in an attempt to overpower the battalion stationed there. While providing close air support to the battalion, a jet fighter was downed by rebel gunfire. Efforts to capture the ejected pilot ensued, resulting in the deaths of 12 soldiers. Despite the ongoing siege and the continual influx of rebel reinforcements, the battalion defended Nakfa against countless attempts by the guerrillas to breach their defenses. Despite being outnumbered, they successfully repelled the relentless assaults. Though the Eritreans failed to take Nakfa, they managed to surround the battalion and put the garrison under siege. Raising the total number of their fighters to about 3,000 against the small garrison of 200 men, of whom 60 were wounded.

In late September 1976, in response to urgent telegraph messages from Major Mammo Temtime, commander of the 15th battalion, 100 paratroopers volunteered to help relive the trapped garrison. After landing a week later, the relived garrison were able to attack the entrenched guerrillas, taking control of the strategic hills around Nakfa. The garrison hoped for more reinforcements and supplies, but due to the power struggles in the Derg regime, the military commanders in Asmara failed to send any more reinforcements. As a result, the battalion was forced to withdraw back into Nakfa.

At this point the besieged troops began to suffer from serious shortages of supplies and equipment. Due to the lack of rations, the garrison had begun to suffer from starvation, and the troops were forced to forage for food. In October 1976, the government troops numbered around 297, within a month that number had dwindled to 170 soldiers. The garrison desperately waited for months for the arrival of supplies and reinforcements. On January 13, 1977, the garrison sent an emotional telegram message to the military government:

We did not realize that we had been thrown away to be finished off by starvation and enemy fire! Like all other human beings, we have our own families. But we have been thrown away like aging dogs. Our children and families who are longing to see us alive always receive news about our death. If we had committed mistakes, we have to be told explicitly and punished accordingly.

Despite this appeal, the message was ignored by the Derg, which had become embroiled in a power struggle, resulting in the execution of General Tafari Benti. The matter concerning the Nakfa garrison appeared to have been disregarded. The government's inability to provide relief or reinforcement to the Nakfa garrison served to embolden the EPLF. The much-anticipated assault eventually occurred on March 22, 1977, when EPLF fighters attacked the exhausted Ethiopian defenders, at this point the defenders managed to rush through the EPLF lines and break through the encirclement. For the next three days, they suffered heavy casualties as they forced their way to friendly lines. By March 25, 53 infantrymen and 22 paratroopers managed to safely reach Afabet, the rest presumed dead.
