= Kidane Wedi Qeshi =

Eritrean Government Official

Kidane "Wedi Qeshi" was an Eritrean Government Official. He has been imprisoned since December 2001.

Kidane was a member of the paramilitary intelligence unit, Brigade 72,("sebAn klten") which used to be headed by Petros Solomon one of the detained reformers. Kidane had been appointed as chief of Intelligence and Security only a year earlier. His arrest is reported to be related to his refusal to arrest the G-15 (Eritrea) reformers because he believed that the detention was "illegal".
