= Casualties and impact of the Ethiopian Civil War =

The Ethiopian Civil War (1974–1991) has had civilian, infrastructure and agricultural impacts. It left at least 1.4 million people dead, with 1 million related to famine and the remainder from violence and conflicts, which was one-third of the population.

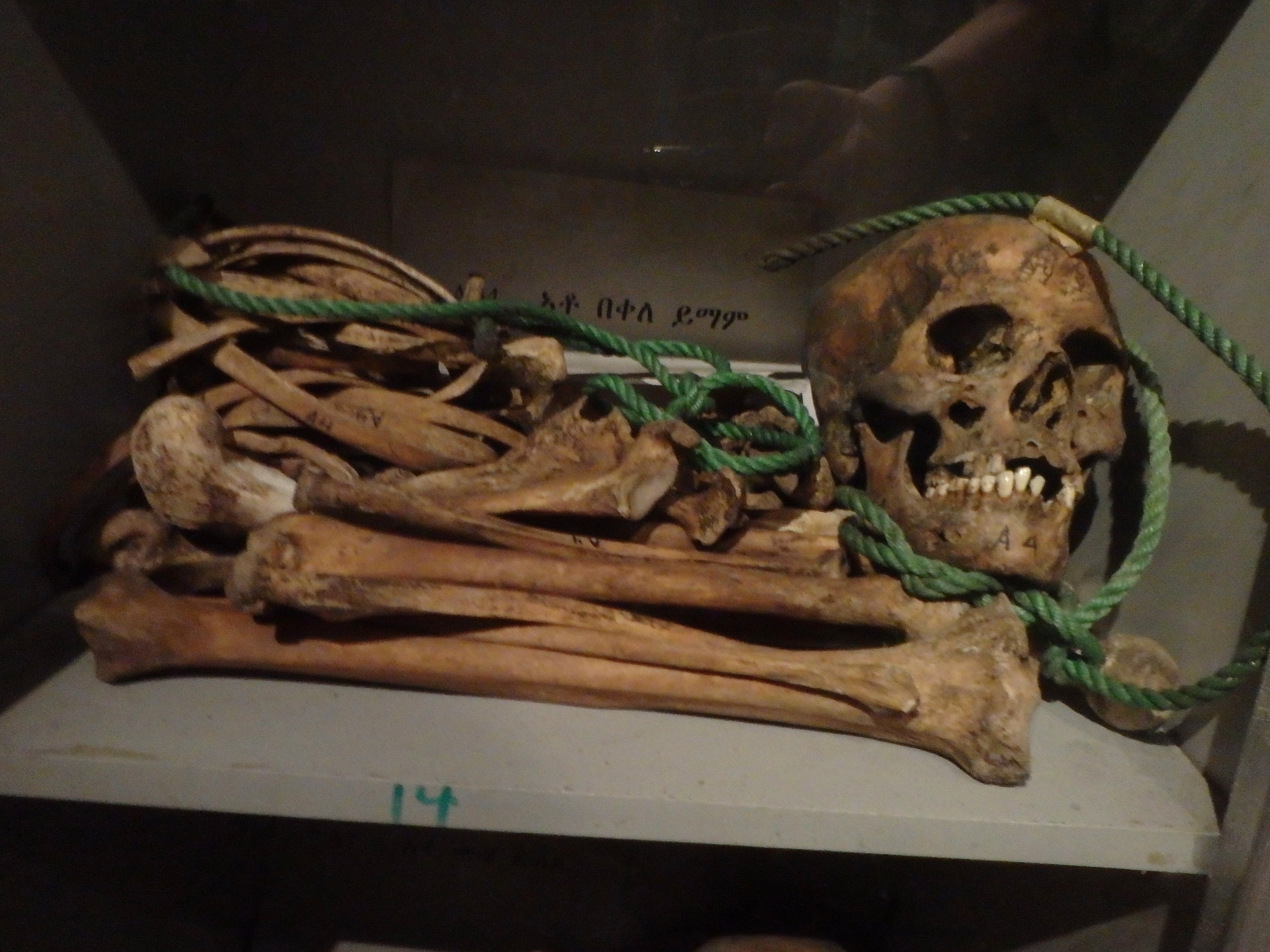
Skull remain of the Red Terror at "Red Terror" Martyrs' Memorial Museum in Addis Ababa

== Impacts ==
=== On land ===
The feudal mode of production has been reversed by nationalized and socialist form; the Land Reform Proclamation of 1974 nationalized all rural land, which became "the collective property" to the Ethiopian people. The land, the most important means of production, had been grabbed by the church (25%), the Emperor and his family (20%), the feudal lords (30%) and state (18%), leaving a mere 7% to the 23 million and odd Ethiopian peasants. The landless peasants lost 75% production to landlords.

Tenancy was abolished and transfer of land was prohibited. It has impact on agrarian reform and the process of deforestation widely aggravated than the previous Haile Selassie regime, especially between 1973 and 1980. Total forest cover in Wollo Province was approximately 2.2% of the total area in 1980, and in Tigray 0.5%, roughly 50% decline since 1960. Soil erosion even more visible with both provinces experiencing topsoil losses of roughly 100 tons per hectare per year during this period. The erosion would more reduce grain products by 120,000 tons per year in the two provinces. The Derg seriously struggled for lowland region of Ethiopia, where there was conflict with Eritrea, and Somalia over the Ogaden region.

From 1984 to 1986, the first phase of the program was started; 600,000 peasants were resettled to the provinces of Welega, Kaffa, Gojjam and Illubabor, with 350,000 resettled to Wollo. The resettlement was also implemented in Tigray only 15% (80,000) people came to the province. This was due to many Tigrayans fled to TPLF or Sudanese border.

=== On agriculture ===
During the first six rule of the Derg, food production decreased by 6%. The drought of 1984–1985 also increasingly impacted the rainfall. In 1981, the rains were 30% below normal. By 1982, the serious drought affected 1.85 million people in Wollo and Tigray provinces. Crop production declined by 12.2% per year from 1982 to 1984. By 1985, the drought produced famine that has equivalent full-scale starvation.

Almost ten million people—one quarter of the country's entire population—were affected, five times of the 1973 drought. Wollo was the most severely affected province, whereas the northern highlands regions, especially in Tigray were deadly damaged by the famine.

== Civilian casualties ==
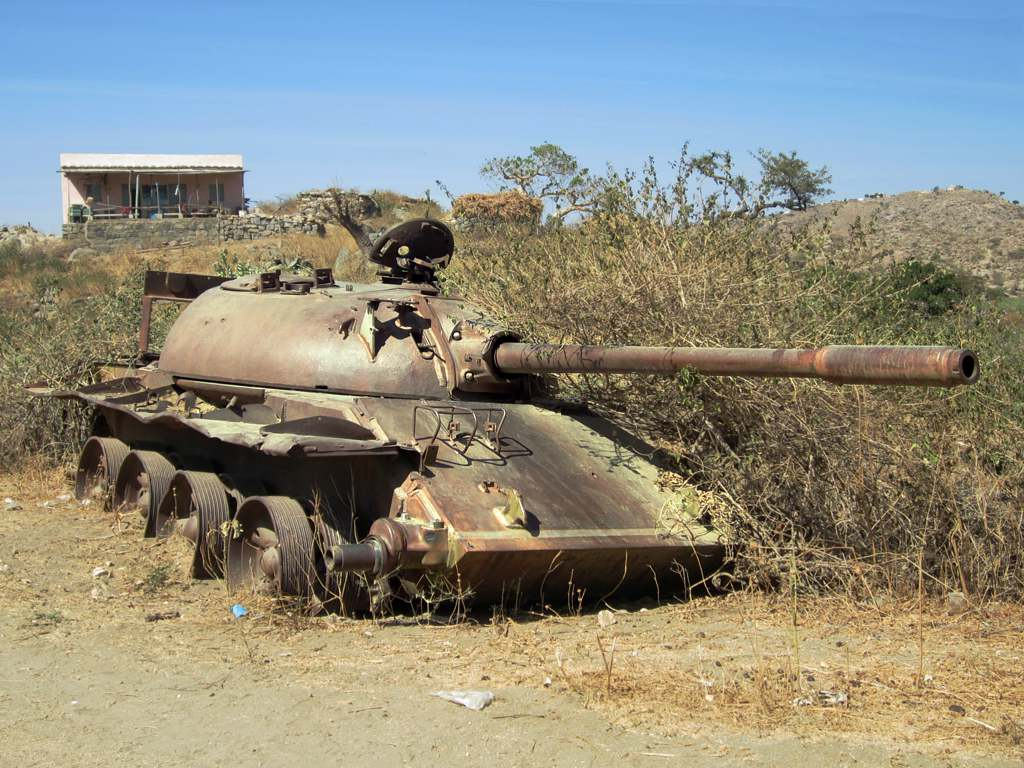
T-55 tank abandoned in 1991 by retreating Ethiopian government forces; located east of Keren, Eritrea.

The first massacre following the revolution was the execution of Imperial government officials on 22 November 1974, which left 59 members dead. In total, the Ethiopian Civil War left at least 1.4 million people dead, with 1 million related to famine and the remainder from violence and conflicts, which is one third of population.

=== Red Terror ===
The highest death toll was registered by the Red Terror in Ethiopia which left over 10,000 deaths. According to Amnesty International, the death toll could be higher than 500,000. The Red Terror was a political repression launched by the Derg in 1976 to suppress internal opposition from rival parties like Ethiopian People's Revolutionary Party (EPRP) and All-Ethiopia Socialist Movement (MEISON) involving brutal execution, mass arbitrary detentions, forced disappearances, and sexual assaults. Thousands of men and women were surrendered and executed over the following two years.

The Swedish Save the Children Fund estimated victims of the Red Terror 1,000 or more children, mostly aged between eleven and thirteen, whose corpses were left in the streets of Addis Ababa. There was also report of church arson and systematic rape of women by soldiers.

According to Kifle Ketema, a witness imprisoned at Keftegna 15, said that guards attached newspapers to fellow prisoners' backs and set them on fire. He also witnessed flagellation, and heard gunshots ring out executions which were conducted outside makeshift cells. In the 1978 Save the Children protests, many children under 13 were killed.

By the 1976, massacre against EPRP members increased. In one instance, the May Day incident, which took place on 29 April 1977, was a key violence against civilians, with at least 1,000 people killed in a few days in Addis Ababa. By early 1978, dead bodies of victims subsided and the Derg government opted to use covert operations for use of violence and distributed prisons in grassroot across Addis Ababa. Alex de Waal further argued for "a comparable number in the provinces in 1977 and 1978". There are no figures of the numbers of civilians killed in Tigray in the Red Terror despite having credible evidence of massacres. Both Amnesty and Reuters estimated the total death rate of the terror in 150,000.

=== 1983–1985 famine ===
During the 1983–1985 famine in Ethiopia, United Nations estimated the number of deaths by hunger at about 1 million. Affecting 7.75 million people (out of Ethiopia's 38–40 million) and left approximately 300,000 to 1.2 million dead. 2.5 million people were internally displaced whereas 400,000 refugees left Ethiopia, and 200,000 children were orphaned. Anti-government insurgency and the government response features the use of indiscriminate violence against civilians by the Ethiopian Army and Air Force. 15,000 people killed excluding those killed by famine and resettlement. Close to 8 million people became famine victims during the drought in 1984, and over 1 million dead. De Waal estimated that 400,000 to 500,000 people died during the famine.

=== Ogaden War ===
The Ogaden War, which was lasted on 15 March 1978, left more than 10,000 individuals deaths, including 6,133 Ethiopian government soldiers, 400 Cuban soldiers, 100 South Yemeni soldiers and 33 Soviet military advisors. Some 500,000 individuals were displaced during the conflict.

According to a report by the New York Times, the death toll was estimated at about 60,000, including 25,000 civilians and 6,000 Cuban soldiers supporting Ethiopia. Military analysis in Washington voiced doubt about the fatalities of Cuban soldiers at large which had force of 20,000 men at its high point. More than 90% of the refugees were women and children.
