= Ethiopian Civil War =

1974–1991 conflict in Ethiopia

- Part of the Eritrean War of Independence, the Ethiopian–Somali conflict, the Oromo conflict, the Cold War, and the Revolutions of 1989
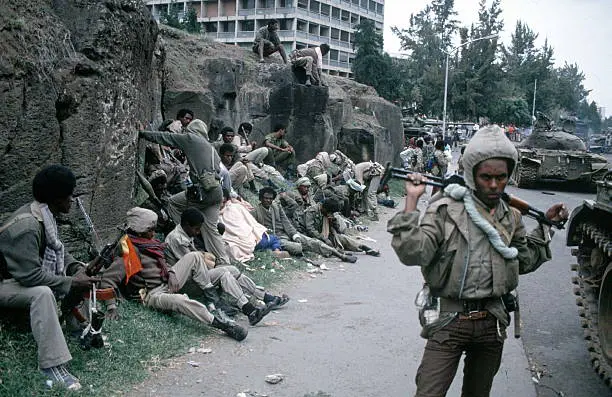
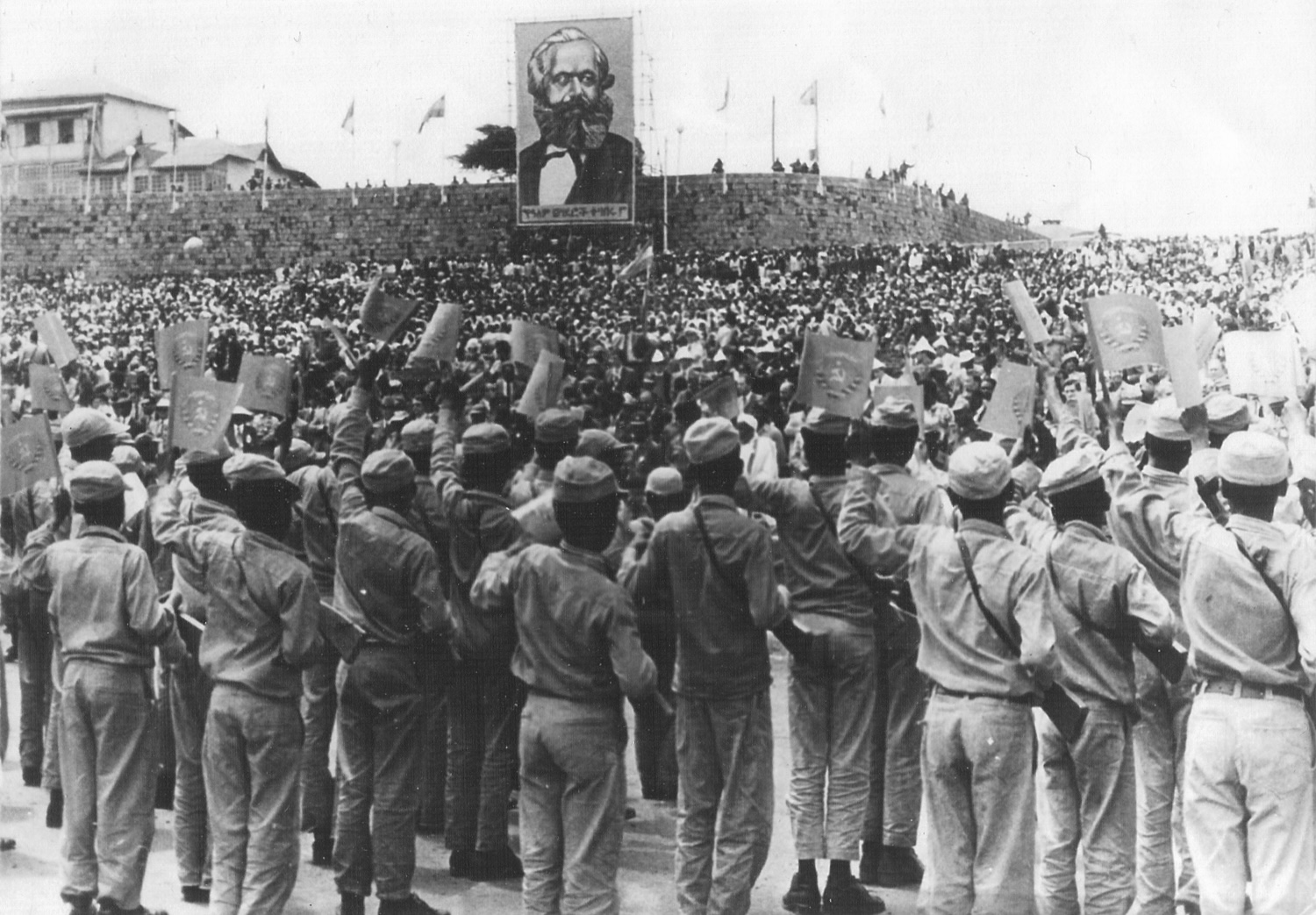
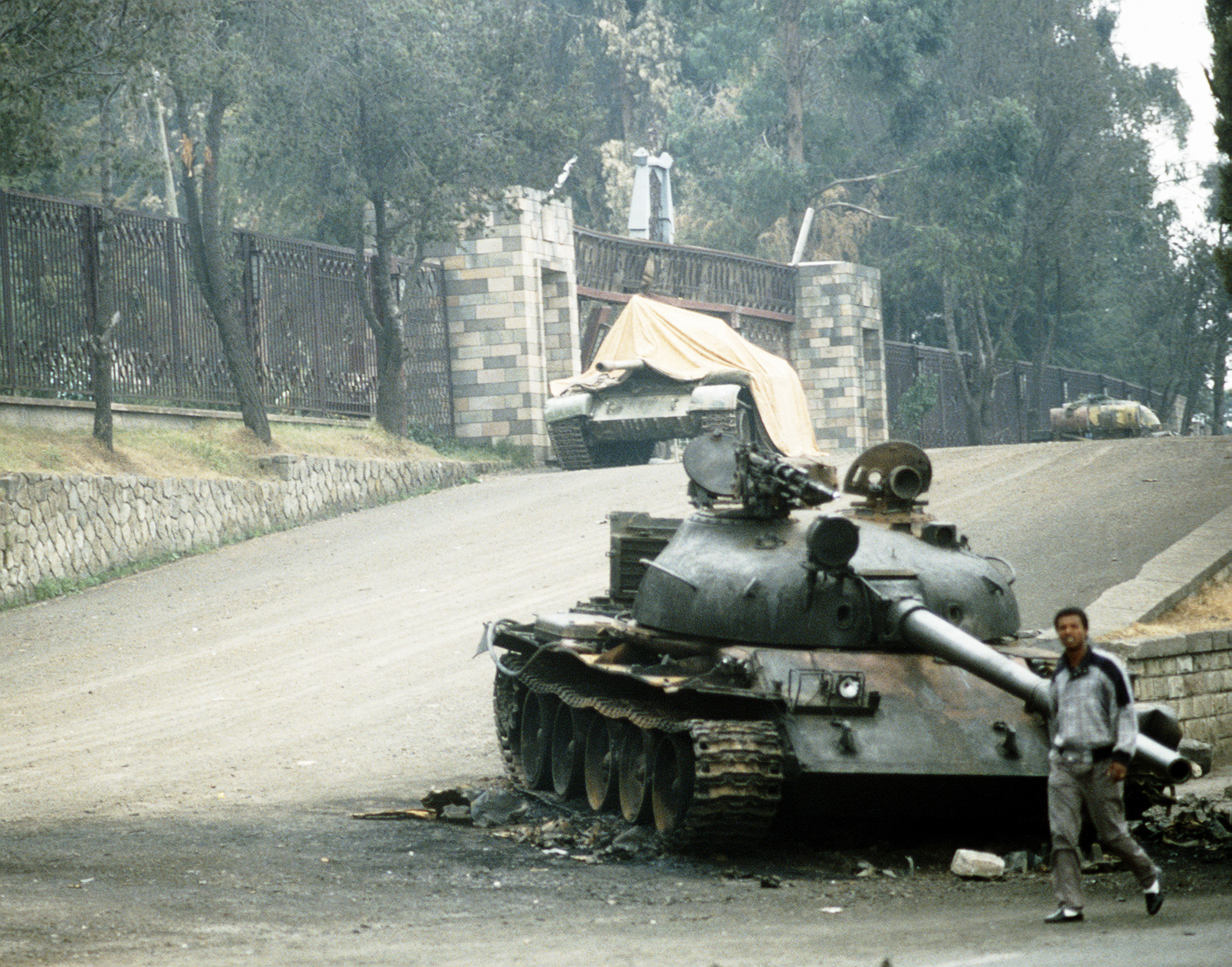
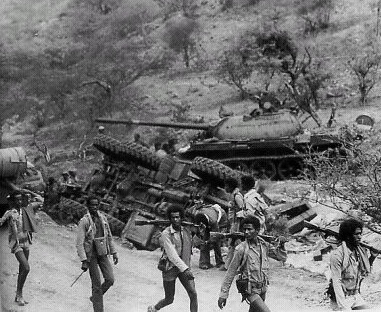
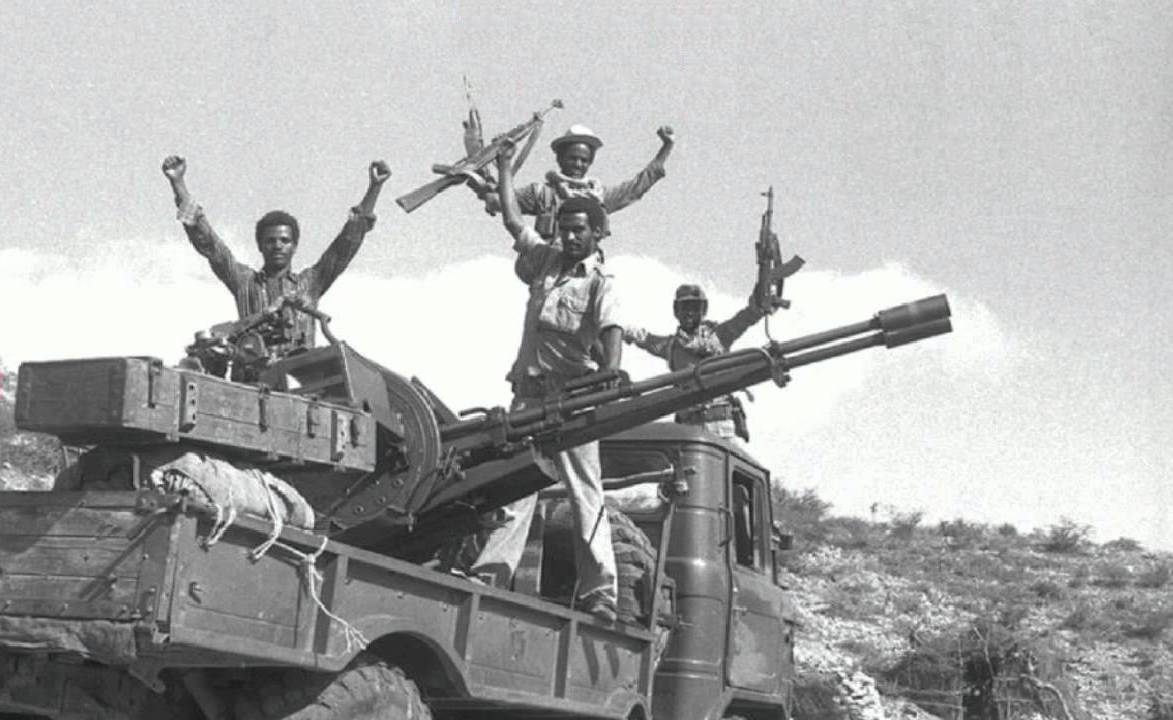
- Clockwise from top: TPLF soldiers gather in Addis Ababa, 1991; T-62 tank destroyed shortly after the fall of the Derg; EPLF rebels on top of a captured GAZ-66; EPLF infantry walks by a destroyed Ethiopian column after the Battle of Afabet; Ethiopian soldiers rally in support of the Derg military junta.
Date	12 September 1974 – 28 May 1991 (16 years, 8 months, 3 weeks and 2 days)
Location	Ethiopia
Result	EPLF/TPLF rebel victory; Creation, then collapse, of the People's Democratic Republic of Ethiopia by the Derg; Installation of the TPLF-led transitional government which would later become the EPRDF government in Ethiopia; Installation of the EPLF-established PFDJ government in Eritrea after independence from Ethiopia
Territorial changes	Independence of Eritrea; Ethiopia becomes a landlocked country.

Belligerents
(Tigray Region) TPLF; EPLF (Amhara Region) EPDM; EPRP; MEISON; EDU; OLF; WSLF; ONLF; ALF; IFLO; SLM; Somalia (1977–1978)	Derg (1974–1987); PDR Ethiopia (1987–1991) Military advisors: Soviet Union (1974–1990); Cuba (1974–1990); Israel (1990–1991)

Commanders and leaders
(Tigray Region) Meles Zenawi; Isaias Afwerki (Amhara Region) Tamrat Layne; Elemo Qiltu †	Mengistu Haile Mariam; Tesfaye Gebre Kidan; Fikre Selassie Wogderess

Strength
(Tigray Region) 141,000 (1991); 110,000 (1990); 13,000 (1991)	230,000 (1991)

Casualties and losses
Casualties and impact of the Ethiopian Civil War	
- ≈400,000–579,000 killed ~1,200,000 deaths from famine

The Ethiopian Civil War was a civil war in Ethiopia and present-day Eritrea, fought between the Ethiopian military junta known as the Derg and Ethiopian-Eritrean anti-government rebels from 12 September 1974 to 28 May 1991.

The Derg overthrew the Ethiopian Empire and Emperor Haile Selassie in a coup d'état on 12 September 1974, establishing Ethiopia as a communist state under a military junta and provisional government. Various nationalist opposition groups of ideological affiliations ranging from communist to anti-communist, often drawn from a specific ethnic background, carried out armed resistance to the Soviet-backed Derg.

Groups like the Eritrean Peoples Liberation Front (EPLF) and the Western Somali Liberation Front (WSLF) had already been fighting against the Ethiopian Empire in the northern Eritrean War of Independence and southern Ogaden insurgency. The Derg used large scale counterinsurgency military campaigns and the Qey Shibir (Red Terror) to repress the rebels. Other rebel fronts such as the Tigrayan Peoples Liberation Front (TPLF) and Oromo Liberation Front (OLF) also increasingly grew in strength over the 1970s. In 1977 Somalia invaded to back the WSLF in the Ogaden, delivering a major blow to the Derg and triggering a large scale Soviet and Cuban military intervention that drove back Somali forces. While this diversion briefly enabled Eritrean rebels to advance, a Soviet‑armed Derg counteroffensive soon reversed their gains as well.

By the mid-1980s, various issues such as the 1983–1985 famine, economic decline, and other after-effects of Derg policies ravaged Ethiopia, increasing popular support for the rebels. In 1984, the Eritrean rebels regained the initiative for the first time since the counteroffensive. The Derg dissolved its military junta in 1987, becoming civilianized and establishing the People's Democratic Republic of Ethiopia (PDRE) under the Workers' Party of Ethiopia (WPE) in an attempt to maintain its rule. The Soviet Union began ending its support for the Derg in the late-1980s and the government was overwhelmed by the increasingly victorious rebel groups.

The Ethiopian Civil War ended on 28 May 1991 when the Ethiopian People's Revolutionary Democratic Front (EPRDF), a coalition of left-wing ethnic rebel groups, entered the capital Addis Ababa and President Mengistu Haile Mariam fled the country to Zimbabwe. The Derg regime was dissolved and replaced with the TPLF-led Transitional Government of Ethiopia.

The Ethiopian Civil War left at least 1.4 million people dead, with 1 million of the deaths being related to famine and the remainder from combat and other violence.

== Background ==
In the 1950s, discontent grew within the Ethiopian Empire toward Emperor Haile Selassie's imperial regime. Many members of the aristocracy became frustrated with the empire's stagnation and limitations. The government's repression and prohibition of autonomous organizations stifled any reformist movements within the ruling class. Although many elites recognized the need for serious reform, Emperor Selassie refused to tolerate any form of protest, especially organized efforts. Even influential Ethiopian families feared the regime's extensive network of spies and the emperor’s potential reaction to dissent, creating an atmosphere of fear among the ruling class.

By the 1960s, the Ethiopian Empire had become politically unstable. The administration was becoming unpopular across all levels of society due to stagnating quality of life, slow economic development, and widespread human rights abuses. During this period, a radicalized student movement emerged, calling for land reform and democratization. In December 1960, the Imperial Guard attempted a military coup, which was violently suppressed by the imperial army and air force. While the use of the military saved Haile Selassie's regime, it made the armed forces a crucial pillar of his rule. The emperor's increasing dependence on their loyalty left the regime's stability precarious, as any signs of discontent within the military could threaten his survival. Throughout the following decade, Selassie sought to placate the military, further heightening their awareness of their growing power and political significance. Since the failed 1960 coup attempt, no further coups had been attempted, largely due to deep divisions within the armed forces.

As the imperial regime declined, the army became increasingly politicized due to Emperor Selassie's reliance on oppressive governance. Recruitment from educated Ethiopians throughout the 1960s and early 1970s heightened the political awareness of the armed forces. This awareness grew as the army was frequently used to suppress student protests, peasant uprisings, and regional revolts in Ogaden, Bale, and Eritrea.

== War ==
=== 1970s ===
At the start of the 1970s numerous parallel and interlocking trends across the empire were converging against the old feudal order, though had yet to coalesce into a well organized oppositional force. Working class Ethiopians had become increasingly dissatisfied with low wages and inflation, while the educated middle class of society were angered by poor governance and stunted advancement.

In Eritrea province, armed resistance against imperial rule was rapidly escalating, but the independence movements were divided into the rivaling Eritrean Liberation Front (ELF) and Eritrean Peoples Liberation Front (EPLF). In the Ogaden and Bale region, attacks by Somali insurgents were beginning to escalate. Elsewhere within the empire, spontaneous peasant uprising began proliferating and students were organized into underground organizations in urban areas across Ethiopia.

The Ethiopian imperial army itself began protesting grievances to the government as the morale of its forces began to break down in Eritrea and the Ogaden. By the early 1970s, with multiplying regional revolts and an economic downturn, many army units became rebellious as their living conditions worsened. By 1973, many observers recognized that the army held the true power behind the throne, and it was widely expected that the military would take control upon the emperor's death. The military mutinies that triggered the 1974 Ethiopian Revolution began with demands for better working conditions and wages for troops stationed in remote regions like Ogaden, Negele, and western Eritrea.

==== Ethiopian Revolution ====
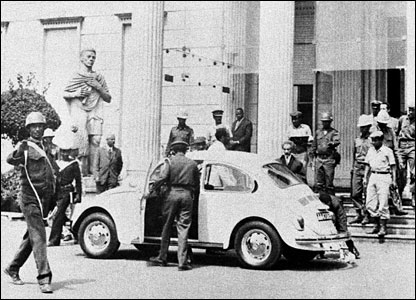
Deposition of Haile Selassie at Jubilee Palace on 12 September 1974

On 12 September 1974, Haile Selassie and his government were overthrown by the Derg, a non-ideological committee of low-ranking officers and enlisted men in the Ethiopian Army who became the ruling military junta. On 21 March 1975, the Derg abolished the monarchy and adopted Marxism–Leninism as their official ideology, establishing themselves as a provisional government for the process of building a socialist state in Ethiopia. The Crown Prince went into exile in London, where several other members of the House of Solomon lived, while other members who were in Ethiopia at the time of the revolution were imprisoned. Haile Selassie, his daughter by his first marriage Princess Ijigayehu, his sister Princess Tenagnework, and many of his nephews, nieces, close relatives, and in-laws were among those detained. On 27 August 1975, Haile Selassie was killed by Ethiopian military officers in the National Palace in Addis Ababa. That year, most industries and private urban real estate holdings were nationalized by the Derg regime. The assets of the former royal family were all seized and were nationalized in a program designed to implement the state ideology of socialism.

Under the Derg, the new Ethiopian military was dominated by the Amhara ethnic group. Similar to the period of the Ethiopian Empire under Menelik II and Haile Selassie, over 80% of generals and over 65% of colonels in the armed forces were Amharas. While the Amhara constituted the majority of the officer corps, the army was still ethnically heterogeneous.

==== Ethiopian Red Terror ====
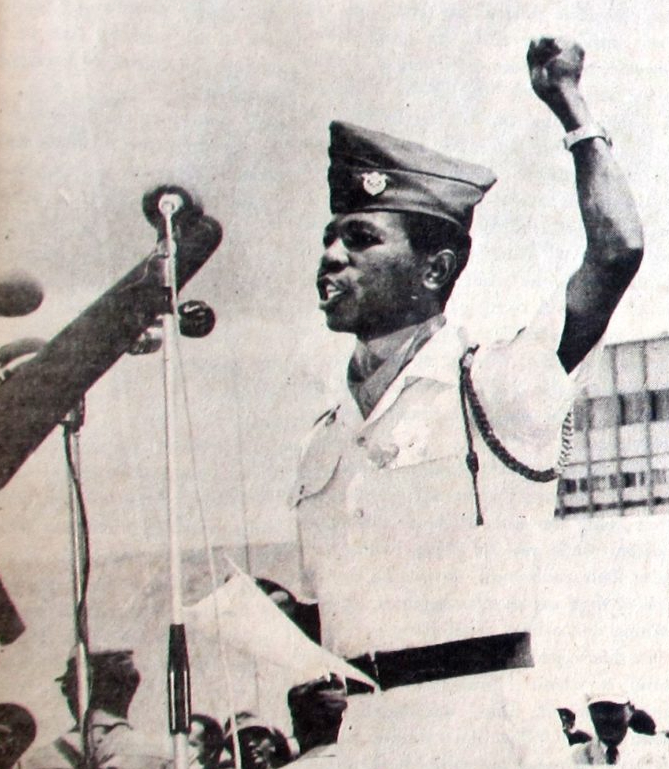
Ethiopian dictator Mengistu Haile Mariam speech, supporting continuation of the Red Terror campaign, April 1977.

The Derg did not fully establish their control over the country, and the subsequent power vacuum led to open challenges from numerous civilian opposition groups. The Ethiopian government had been fighting Eritrean separatists in the Eritrean War of Independence since 1961, and now faced other rebel groups ranging from the conservative and pro-monarchy Ethiopian Democratic Union (EDU), to the rival Marxist–Leninist Ethiopian People's Revolutionary Party (EPRP), and the ethnic Tigray People's Liberation Front (TPLF). In 1976, the Derg instigated the Qey Shibir (Ethiopian Red Terror), a campaign of violent political repression primarily targeting the EPRP and later the All-Ethiopia Socialist Movement (MEISON), in an attempt to consolidate their power.

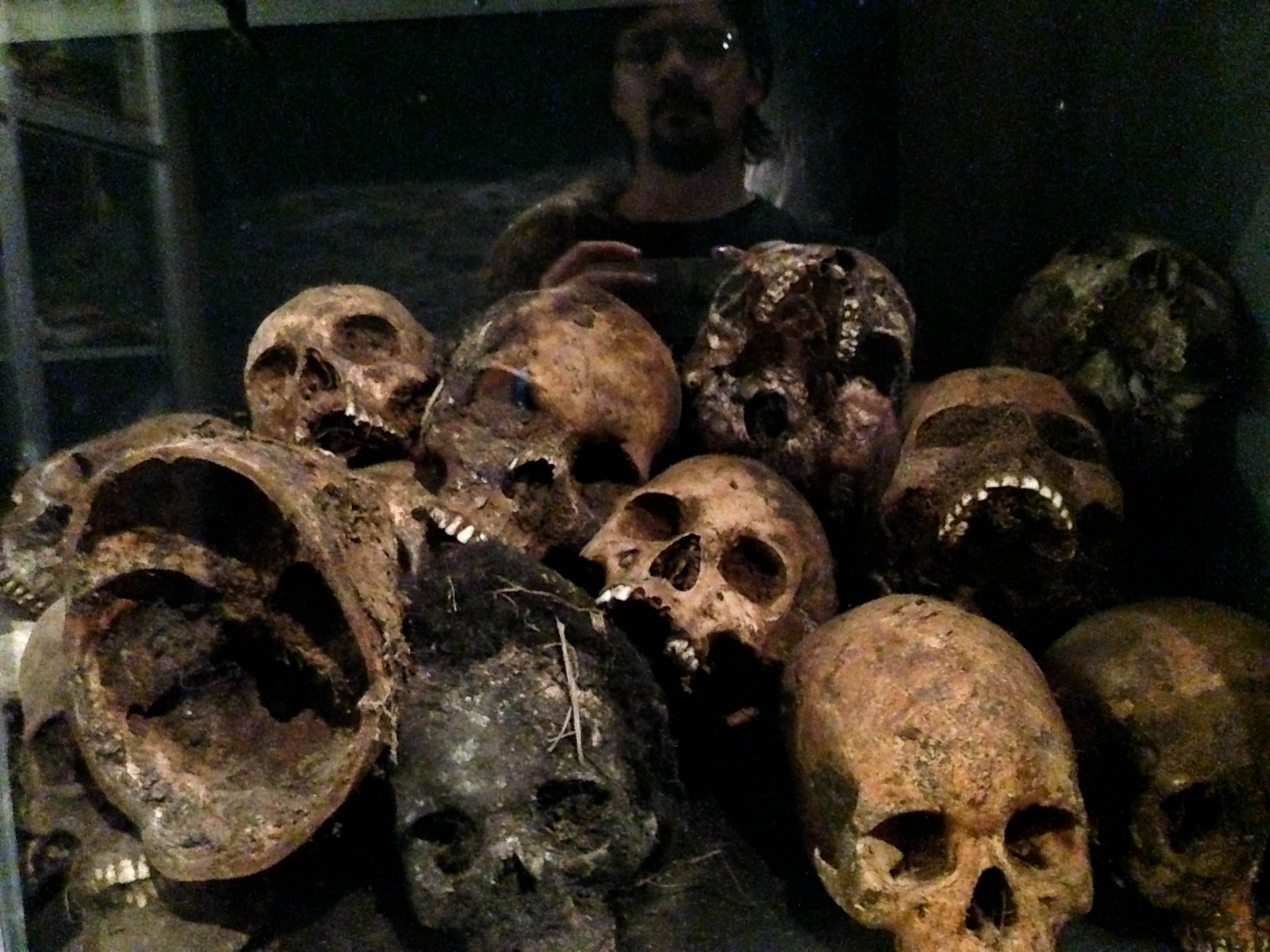
The remains of some of the victims of the Red Terror

The Qey Shibir was escalated on 3 February 1977 following the appointment of Mengistu Haile Mariam as Chairman of the Derg, who took a hardline stance against opponents. The urban guerrilla warfare saw brutal tactics used on all sides, including summary executions, assassinations, torture and imprisonment without trial. By August 1977, the EPRP and MEISON were devastated, with their leadership either dead or fleeing to the countryside to continue their activities in stronghold areas, but despite this, the Derg did not successfully consolidate their power as much as hoped. Ironically, the majority of the Qey Shibir's estimated 30,000 to 750,000 victims are believed to be innocents, with the violence and collateral damage shocking many Ethiopians into supporting rebel groups. There are currently many civilians who are still missing who are thought to have been systematically killed by the Derg but are yet unaccounted for.

==== Eritrean insurgency ====
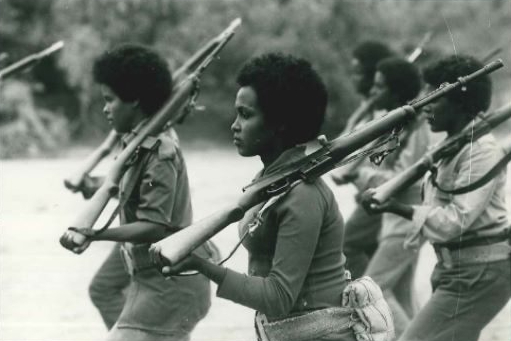
Eritrean women fighters.

Eritrea had been annexed by the Ethiopian Empire in the early 1960s. In 1961, the Eritrean Liberation Front (ELF) began armed resistance to Ethiopian rule. When the Derg came to power, Eritreans were widely subjected to increasing repression and economic disruption as the government sought to crush the elusive insurgency in vain. Reports from Asmara in 1974, the capital of the region, told of civilian massacres by army troops and rape at gunpoint. During January 1975 Eritrean resistance fighters began attacking the Ethiopian army in and around Asmara.

The following year saw the Derg regime mobilize its first in a series of 'peasant marches'. The government made a call for 100,000 peasants to crush the Eritrean nationalists, though only 30,000 were organized for the first assault into Eritrea.

==== Somali insurgency and Ogaden War ====
The early 1970s saw the Somali liberation movement for the Ogaden region continue to gain momentum off the foundations of the Nasrallah insurgency which had fought a major revolt from 1963 to 1965 against Emperor Haile Selassie's empire. The many veteran insurgents and young intelligentsia from the Ogaden region within Siad Barre's government lobbied for Somalia to support the resumption of the armed struggle during the 1970s.

By June 1977, the Western Somali Liberation Front (WSLF) had been successful in forcing the Ethiopian army out of much of the Ogaden and into the major urban strongholds of Jigjiga, Dire Dawa and Harar. President of Somalia Siad Barre decided to intensify the war by involving the Somali army as he believed it would allow the WSLF to press home their growing victories and enable the complete secession of the Ogaden. On 13 July 1977, the Ogaden War was triggered when the Somali Democratic Republic invaded the Ogaden region in order to assist the WSLF. By November and the onset of the rainy season, the WSLF was poised to capture the city of Harar.

A massive military air and sea lift from the Soviet Union transferred around two billion dollars' worth of military equipment while 1,700 Soviet advisors and 17,000 Cuban troops were deployed against the Somali National Army and WSLF. In early 1978 the Ethiopian forces, spearheaded by Cuban troops in an operation planned by Soviet generals, managed to push back the SNA/WSLF forces.

In 1977 the Eritrean insurgency had taken advantage of the Derg's preoccupation with war for the Ogaden against the Western Somali Liberation Front and Somali National Army. Immediately after the Ogaden War ended–the Ethiopian army, with Cuban support, reoriented to Eritrea and forced the ELF and EPLF out of many areas they had liberated in the prior months. Using the considerable manpower and military hardware available from the Somali campaign, the Ethiopian Army regained the initiative. Notable military engagements occurred in this period such as the Siege of Barentu and the First Battle of Massawa.

The Eritreans would not regain the initiative until 1984.

=== 1980s ===
Areas of operation of the various insurgent groups during the war. The EPRDF drive on Addis Ababa is shown with red arrows.

By 1980, the original 120 ruling members of the Derg had been whittled down to only 38. All members but three were ethnic Amhara and were predominantly from settler colonialist neftenya origins. Many members of the ruling elite were deeply opposed to the idea of loosening control on the rebellious southern regions conquered under Menelik II.

At the start of the decade the Ethiopian army had swelled to a force of 250,000 strong. During the early 1980s the Ethiopian government rendered the Somali inhabited Ogaden region a vast military zone, engaging in indiscriminate aerial bombardments and forced resettlement programs.

During the fall of 1980, towns and villages in Tigray were bombarded with napalm and cluster bombs by the regime. Massive military infantry sweeps across the countryside resulted in high civilian fatalities. The Tigray Peoples Liberation Front (TPLF) dominated most the region, with the Ethiopian army restricted to major towns and highways.

In 1981 there were an estimated 60,000 to 70,000 Ethiopian army troops in Eritrea. 70,000 troops were also stationed in the Ogaden, supported by 10,000 Cuban army troops who garrisoned the region's towns. In Tigray there were an estimated 40,000 and in the southern Oromo provinces 20,000 were deployed.

The Derg in its attempt to introduce full-fledged socialist ideals, fulfilled its main slogan of "Land to the Tiller", by redistributing land in Ethiopia that once belonged to landlords to the peasants tilling the land. Although this was made to seem like a fair and just redistribution, the mismanagement, corruption, and general hostility to the Derg's violent and harsh rule coupled with the draining effects of constant warfare, separatist guerrilla movements in Eritrea and Tigray, resulted in a drastic decline in general productivity of food and cash crops. Although Ethiopia is often prone to chronic droughts, no one was prepared for the scale of drought and the 1983–1985 famine that struck the country in the mid-1980s, in which 400,000–590,000 people are estimated to have died. Hundreds of thousands fled economic misery, conscription and political repression, and went to live in neighboring countries and all over the Western world, creating an Ethiopian diaspora community for the first time in its history. Insurrections against the Derg's rule sprang up with ferocity, particularly in the northern regions of Tigray and Eritrea which sought independence and in some regions in the Ogaden. Hundreds of thousands were killed as a result of the Qey Shibir, forced deportations. The Derg continued its attempts to end rebellions with military force by initiating several campaigns against both internal rebels and the Eritrean People's Liberation Front (EPLF), the most important ones being Operation Shiraro, Operation Lash, Operation Red Star, and Operation Adwa, which led to its decisive defeat in the Battle of Shire on 15–19 February 1989 which ultimately led to Eritrean independence. This marked a receding end in power to the Derg.

During the 1980s, the United States government was reported to have given $500,000 annually in aid from at least 1981 to 1985 to the Ethiopian People's Democratic Alliance, as part of U.S. Cold War strategy.

=== 1990s ===
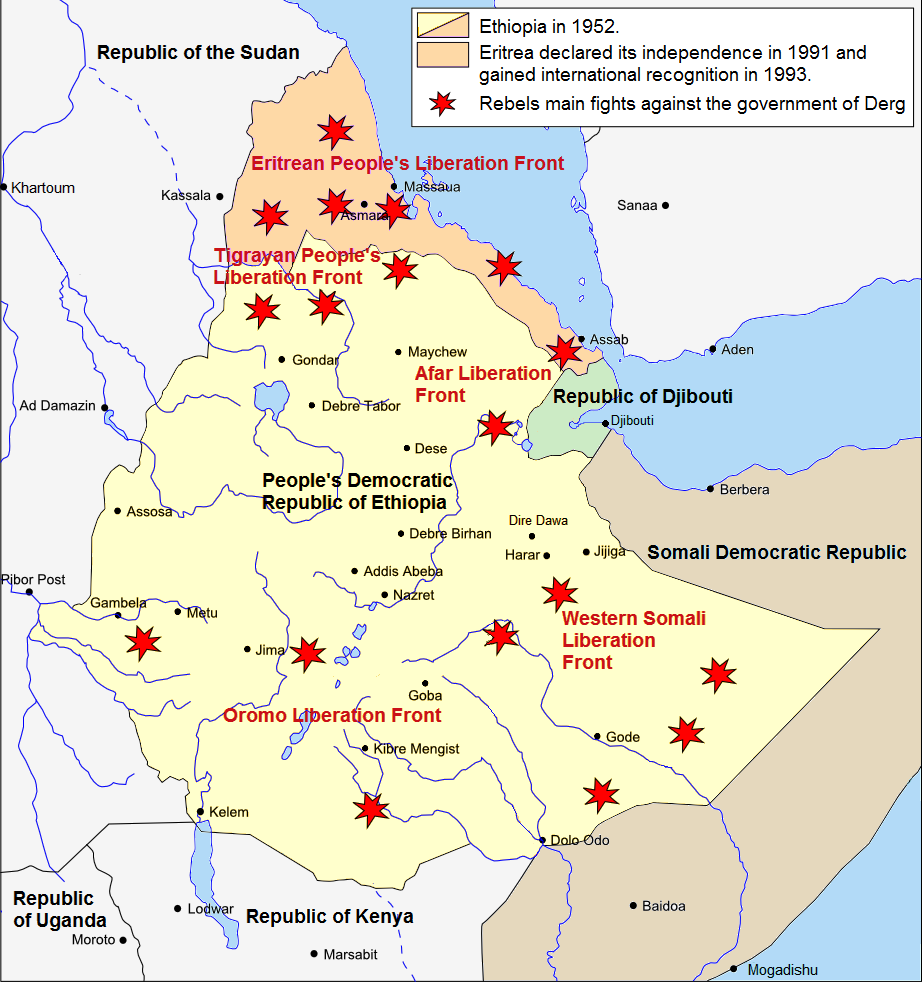
Military situation during the Ethiopian Civil War

On 28 May 1991, Mengistu's government was overthrown by its own officials and a coalition of rebel forces, the Ethiopian People's Revolutionary Democratic Front (EPRDF), after their bid for a push on the capital Addis Ababa was successful. There was some fear that Mengistu would attempt to fight to the bitter end for the capital, but after diplomatic intervention by the United States, he fled to asylum in Zimbabwe, where he still resides. The regime only survived another week after his ousting before the EPRDF poured into the capital and captured Addis Ababa.

The EPRDF immediately disbanded the Workers' Party of Ethiopia and shortly afterward arrested almost all of the most prominent Derg officials that were still in the country. In December 2006, 72 officials of the Derg were found guilty of genocide. Thirty-four people were in court, 14 others died during the lengthy process and 25, including Mengistu, were tried in absentia. These events marked the end of socialist rule in Ethiopia. Ethiopia then embraced a federal democracy to represent the many ethnic groups living in the country.

That ethnic-federal settlement later came under severe strain, and commemorations marking the fiftieth anniversary of the revolution in 2024 drew explicit parallels between Derg-era atrocities and more recent violence such as the Tigray War, while noting that accountability for the period remained largely elusive as Mengistu stayed in exile in Zimbabwe.

== Peasant revolution in Ethiopia ==
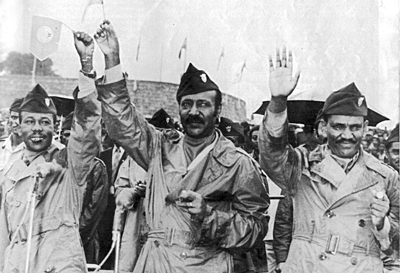
Senior Derg members Mengistu Haile Mariam, Tafari Benti, and Atnafu Abate.

There is not much in-depth information available about the revolution, but the book Peasant Revolution in Ethiopia by John Young provides detailed information about the revolution, why it started, how the Derg affected the nation, and the role of the peasant population in Tigray and Eritrea.

== Casualties and impacts ==
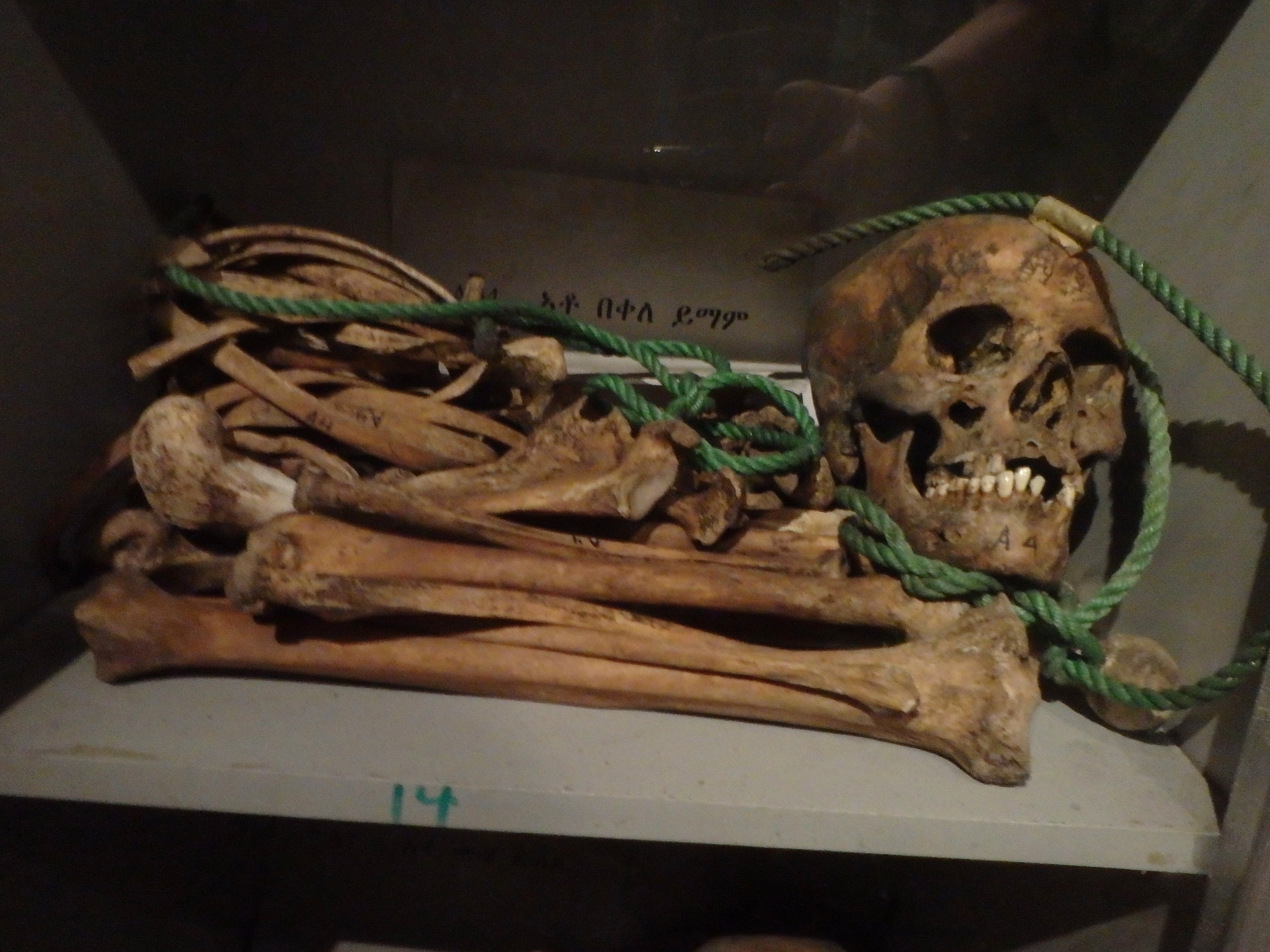
Skull remain of the Red Terror at "Red Terror" Martyrs' Memorial Museum in Addis Ababa

The Ethiopian Civil War left at least 1.4 million people dead, with 1 million casualties being related to famine and the remainder from violence and conflicts, which was one third of the population. It also had impacts on land and agriculture: the former feudal system under which peasants would lose up to 75% of their production to landlords was reversed by the implementation of nationalized reforms. Total forest cover in Wollo Province was approximately 2.2% of the total area in 1980, and in Tigray 0.5%, roughly 50% decline since 1960. Soil erosion could halt grain production by 120,000 tons per year in Wollo Province.

During the first six years, food production also increased by 6%. Crop production declined by 12.2% per year from 1982 to 1984. With the 1983–1985 famine, ten million people were affected five times of the 1973 drought.

== List of major battles ==
- 1974: Battle of Tirro
- 1977: First Battle of Massawa
- 1977: Siege of Barentu
- 1977–1978: Battle of Jijiga
- 1978: Battle of Harar
- 1982: Red Star Campaign
- 1988: Battle of Afabet, 17–20 March
- 1988: Battle of Shire (1989), 28 December 1988 – 19 February 1989
- 1990: Second Battle of Massawa, 8–10 February

== See also ==
- Neftenya
- Second Afar Insurgency

== Works cited ==
- De Waal, Alex (1991). De Waal, Alexander; Human Rights Watch (eds.). Evil days: thirty years of war and famine in Ethiopia. An Africa Watch report. New York: Human Rights Watch. ISBN 978-1-56432-038-4.
- Abdi, Mohamed Mohamud (2021). A History of the Ogaden (Western Somali) Struggle for Self-Determination: Part I (1300–2007) (2nd ed.). UK: Safis Publishing. ISBN 978-1-906342-39-5. OCLC 165059930.
- Kebede, Messay (2011). Ideology and elite conflicts: autopsy of the Ethiopian revolution. Lanham, Md: Lexington books. ISBN 978-0-7391-3796-3.
- Hammond, Jenny (1999). Fire from the ashes: a chronicle of the revolution in Tigray, Ethiopia, 1975 - 1991 (1. print ed.). Lawrenceville, NJ: Red Sea Press. ISBN 978-1-56902-086-9.
- Schmid, Alex Peter; Jongman, A. J. (2005). Political Terrorism: A New Guide to Actors, Authors, Concepts, Data Bases, Theories, & Literature. Vol. 3. Transaction. ISBN 9781412804691.
- Tareke, Gebru (2009). The Ethiopian Revolution: War in the Horn of Africa. Yale University Press. ISBN 978-0-300-15615-7.
- Young, John (1997). Peasant revolution in Ethiopia: the Tigray People's Liberation Front, 1975-1991. African studies series. Cambridge, U.K.; New York, NY, USA: Cambridge University Press. ISBN 978-0-521-59198-0.
