= Tesfaye Gebreab =

Eritrean diplomat (1968–2021)

- ተስፋዬ ገብረኣብ
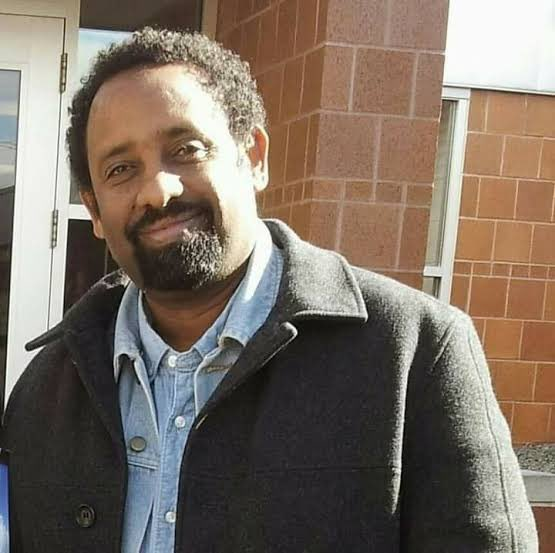
- Born: 28 August 1968; Bishoftu, Ethiopia
- Died: 24 December 2021 (aged 53); Nairobi, Kenya
- Citizenship: Eritrea
- Occupation: Author
- Writing career
- Pen name: Gadaa
- Genre: Non-fiction
- Subjects: Oromia, Eritrea
- Notable works: The Nurenebi File (የኑረነቢ ማህደር); Yederasiw Mastawesha; የቲራቮሎ ዋሻ

Tesfaye Gebreab (Tigrinya: ተስፋዬ ገብረኣብ, Amharic: ተስፋዬ ገብረአብ, 28 August 1968 – 24 December 2021) was an Eritrean writer and literary publisher. He was a journalist and editor in the Ethiopian printed press. In Eritrea, he was mainly known for his books and his attachment to the Oromo ethnic group.

His book የቡርቃ ዝምታ (The Silence of the Burqa) was a book that narrated history of Oromo resistance history and future hopes. Because of his contributions to Oromo literature, he was given an honorary name 'Gadaa'.

Gebreab worked as a journalist before becoming a full time writer. He penned eight books, including historical novels, true stories, short stories, and memoirs. One of his later books, የኑረነቢ ማህደር (The Nurenebi File), a hundred year long story of Eritrea and Ethiopia, received wide scale recognition locally and regionally. Gebreab wrote in Amharic.

== Personal life and death ==
Gebreab was born on 28 August 1968 in Ethiopia, in the town of Bishoftu. His parents were originally from the Province of Eritrea. In the 1950s they migrated from Mendefera to Ethiopia. Tesfaye served as the director of Ethiopia's ministry of information. He was also the editor in chief of a local magazine. He authored numerous articles and books. After he became Minister of Information, he relaxed censorship rules and made it possible for countless fellow authors and journalists to publish their works. He wrote all of his books in Amharic while a few of them were translated to Tigrinya and Afan Oromo.

He died in Nairobi, Kenya on 24 December 2021, at the age of 53.
