= First Battle of Massawa =

1977–1978 battle of the Eritrean War of Independence

- Part of the Eritrean War of Independence and Ethiopian Civil War
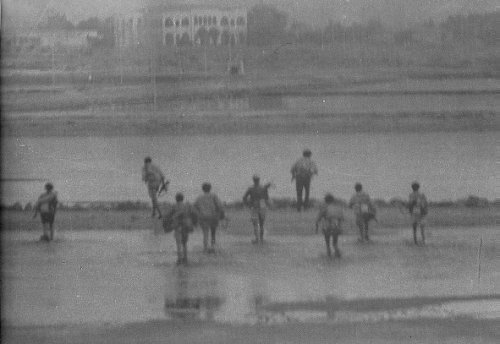
- EPLF fighters try to storm the city of Massawa
Date	1977–1978
Location	Massawa, Ethiopia
Result	Ethiopian victory

Belligerents
EPLF	Ethiopia

Commanders and leaders
Mesfin Hagos	Merid Negussie

Casualties and losses
At least 2,000 dead 400 wounded	Unknown

The First Battle of Massawa took place from 1977 to 1978 in and around the coastal city of Massawa. The port was besieged by the Eritrean People's Liberation Front (EPLF) against the forces of Ethiopia and was one of two battles in and around the city.

== The battle ==
On March 25, 1977, the EPLF overran the Ethiopian garrison at Nakfa. The fall of Nakfa highly demoralized other garrisons throughout the region. In the next few months, the EPLF controlled Afabet, Keren, Elabored, and Dekemhare and captured many weapons. Similarly, the ELF seized Omhajar, Teseney, Adordat, Mendefera, and Adi Kuala. Though they remained in government hands, Asmara, Barentu, Adi Keyeh, and Massawa were now besieged by the insurgents. By October 1977, EPLF fighters had besieged the town of Massawa. This included the main road used by the garrison for the transport of supplies from Asmara. Essentially the garrison was cut off by land and under siege.

On 9 December 1977, the Ethiopian garrison launched a strong counterattack against the EPLF positions on the coastal lowlands near Mai Antal, however this attack ended in failure and the Ethiopians were forced to retreat to Massawa, allowing the EPLF to take control of Dogali. On 21 December 1977, the EPLF managed to overrun the city's main defensive perimeter, forcing the Ethiopian defenders to pull back to the Abd-el Kader and Gherar peninsulas and the islands, where they were protected by naval support. On 23 December, the EPLF launched a massive frontal assault on the final Ethiopian positions on the peninsulas. When the EPLF fighters attempted to march through the evaporation ponds of the Salina saltworks, the Ethiopian naval artillery initiated a devastating barrage that killed over 2,000 EPLF fighters and wounded 400. The EPLF was forced to pull back for a long siege, before completely withdrawing to Semhar in July 1978.

== See also ==
- Battle of Massawa (1990)
- Eritrean War of Independence
