= Second Battle of Massawa =

1990 battle of the Eritrean War of Independence

- Part of Eritrean War of Independence
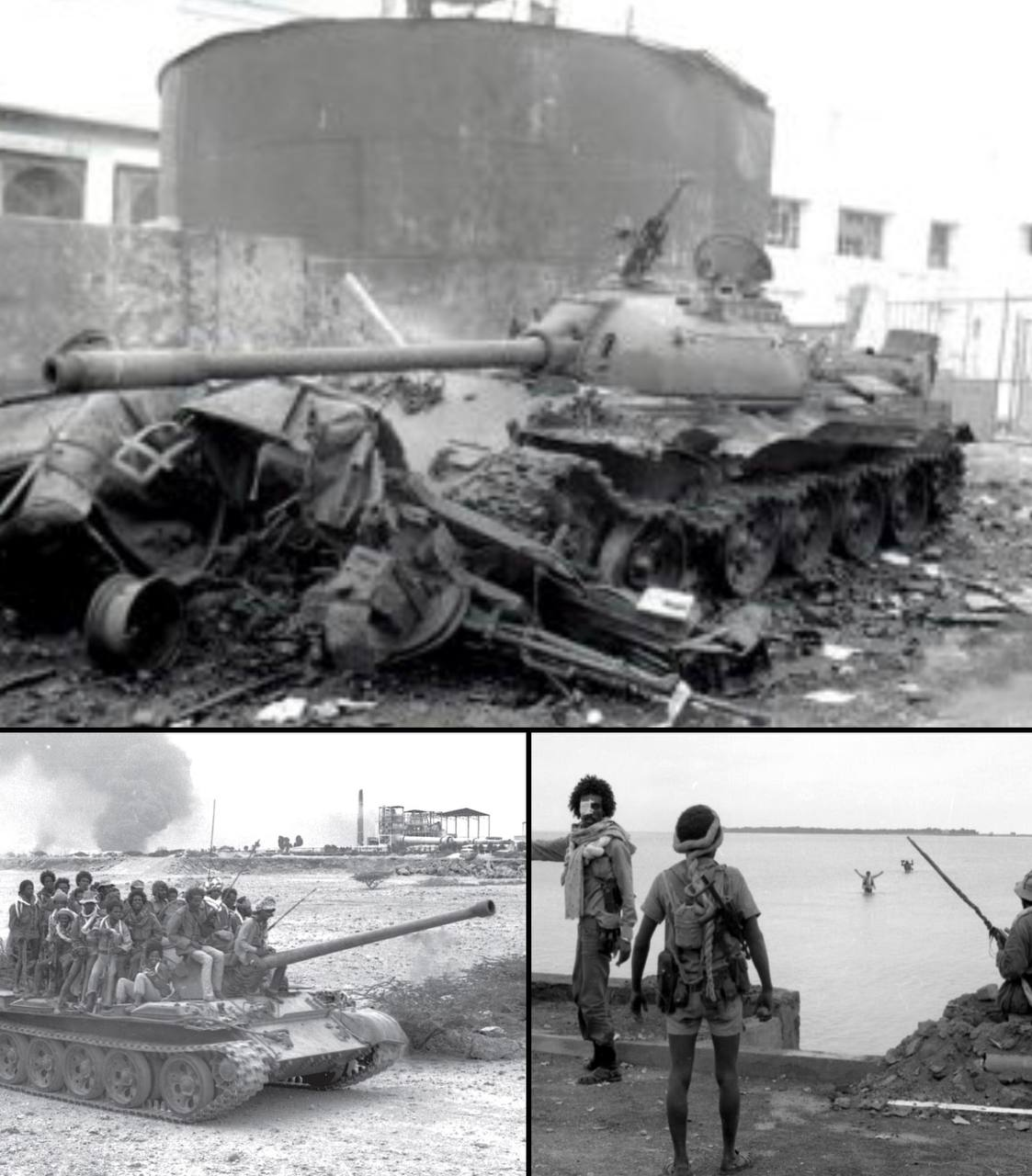
- Montage of the battle. Clockwise - a damaged and abandoned government tank; government soldiers surrender to EPLF fighters; EPLF militiamen on a tank.
Date	February 8–17, 1990
Location	Massawa, Ethiopia
Result	EPLF victory

Belligerents
EPLF	Ethiopia

Commanders and leaders
Petros Solomon	Teshome Tessema †

Strength
20,000	17,000

Casualties and losses
3,000 killed	9,000 killed 8,000 captured

The Second Battle of Massawa (also known as Operation Fenkil and as the Fenkil offensive) took place in 1990 in and around the coastal city of Massawa. The offensive was conducted by both land and sea units of the Eritrean People's Liberation Front (EPLF) against the Ethiopian Army and resulted in the destruction of the Ethiopian 606th Corps.

== Battle ==
Throughout 1980s fighting raged in Eritrea. A 1988 peace agreement between Somalia and Ethiopia allowed the Ethiopians to reorient the full force of their army to the northern front. During the Battle of Afabet that same year, large quantities of weaponry and munitions were captured from the Ethiopians, including dozens of tanks. In the months leading up to the capture of the strategic port city of Massawa, intense fighting was raging between the Eritrean insurgents and the Ethiopian army.

Operation Fenkil commenced during the night of February 8, 1990, when highly agile and effectively coordinated EPLF forces initiated their offensive from She'eb, overrunning the Ethiopian 6th Division's forward headquarters, situated eighty-six kilometers away from Massawa. The operation unfolded along two primary axes: wide outflanking maneuvers commenced along the ridges on both the western and eastern flanks. While one unit swiftly advanced towards Weqiro on the left, the main column surged towards Ghedghed, subsequently dividing into three sections. The right flank maneuvered towards Adi Ile with the aim of outflanking the Ethiopian 6th Infantry Division of the 606th Corps stationed at Adishum, while the left flank directed its course towards Sehatit. After five hours of fighting, the Ethiopian defense line was shattered, and the survivors fled to Dogali. The EPLF mechanized and armored units pursued them. The Ethiopian 18th Infantry Division and two mechanized brigades were dispatched from Asmara to rescue them, but the EPLF repulsed them and forced them to retreat to Ghinda. Two days later Dogali had fallen to the EPLF and the 606th Corps were now trapped in the city of Massawa.

The battle for Massawa began on February 10, what followed was the most destructive and violent engagements of the war. EPLF marines in speedboats attacked the naval base early in the morning as a diversion, causing confusion among the defenders. The main EPLF column then overran the Ethiopian defenses and were now storming the city, at this point the government forces were now split into two, one half led by General Kifle retreated to the naval base and the other half led by General Teshome Tessma fled to Tualud Island. The EPLF then moved to take over the naval base, using land and naval units to capture the base. On the early morning of February 12th, General Kifle and his men surrendered to the EPLF and the naval base had fallen under EPLF control. The commander of the Ethiopian 6th Division, General Teshome, refused to surrender, instead taking hundreds of civilians as hostages.

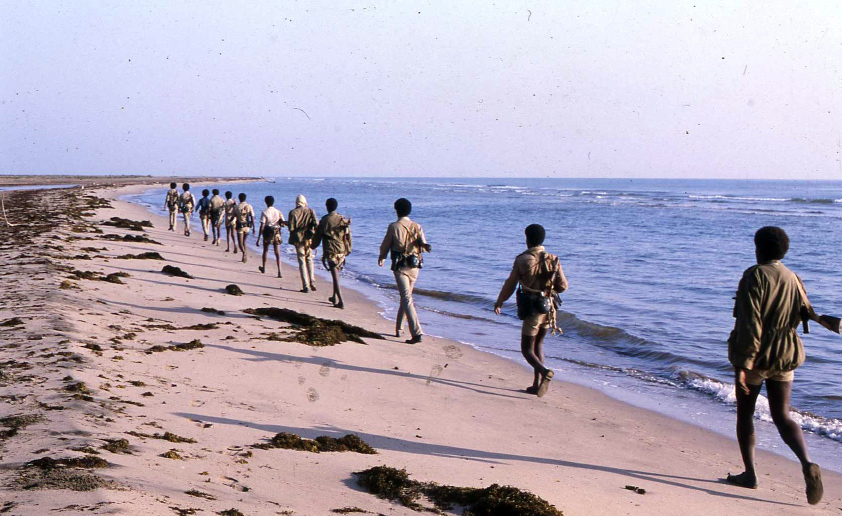
EPLF in Massawa, Red Sea Coast

On the 14th, to spare the city from more destruction, the EPLF delivered a message to General Teshome in Tualud via two prisoners of war sent as messengers. The letter, signed by General Kifle, told General Teshome to "surrender peacefully by February 15, 1990. Since no help can reach you by land or sea, you have no choice but to surrender. Surrender to the EPLF and we will arrange for you to go to whatever country you wish. The EPLF will take responsibility for your welfare. We urge you to release the inhabitants of Massawa." But General Teshome refused to surrender, tossing aside the letter and vowing to fight till the last man. The next day the EPLF launched a joint and coordinated assault on Tualud, the island was shelled by artillery, tanks and mortars. On the 17th, EPLF armored units was advancing along the causeway towards the island, but the Ethiopians were able to hit them with RPGs, destroying a number of T-55s. At the height of the battle, EPLF naval units on speed boats were able to land on the island, taking the Ethiopian defenders by surprise. Now attacked from two sides, the defenders began to crumble in the face of this ensuing onslaught. Realizing that the battle was finally lost, General Teshome and about 150 officers committed suicide.

The defeat was complete, catastrophic, and irreversible. Even the vengeful bombing, which persisted until the end of March and resulted in the destruction of numerous historic Islamic buildings, could not alter the disastrous outcome. Isaias Afewerki, leader of the EPLF, concurs, acknowledging the fall of Massawa as the greatest strategic victory during the struggle.

After the loss of Massawa, the Ethiopians continued their aerial bombardment of the city, the civilian population was hardest hit. Notable of this bombardment was that napalm and cluster bombs were used.

Out of the 17,000 Ethiopian soldiers in the city, more than 8,000 were captured and 9,000 were killed. Whereas only 3,000 EPLF fighters were killed during Operation Fenkil.

== Commemoration ==
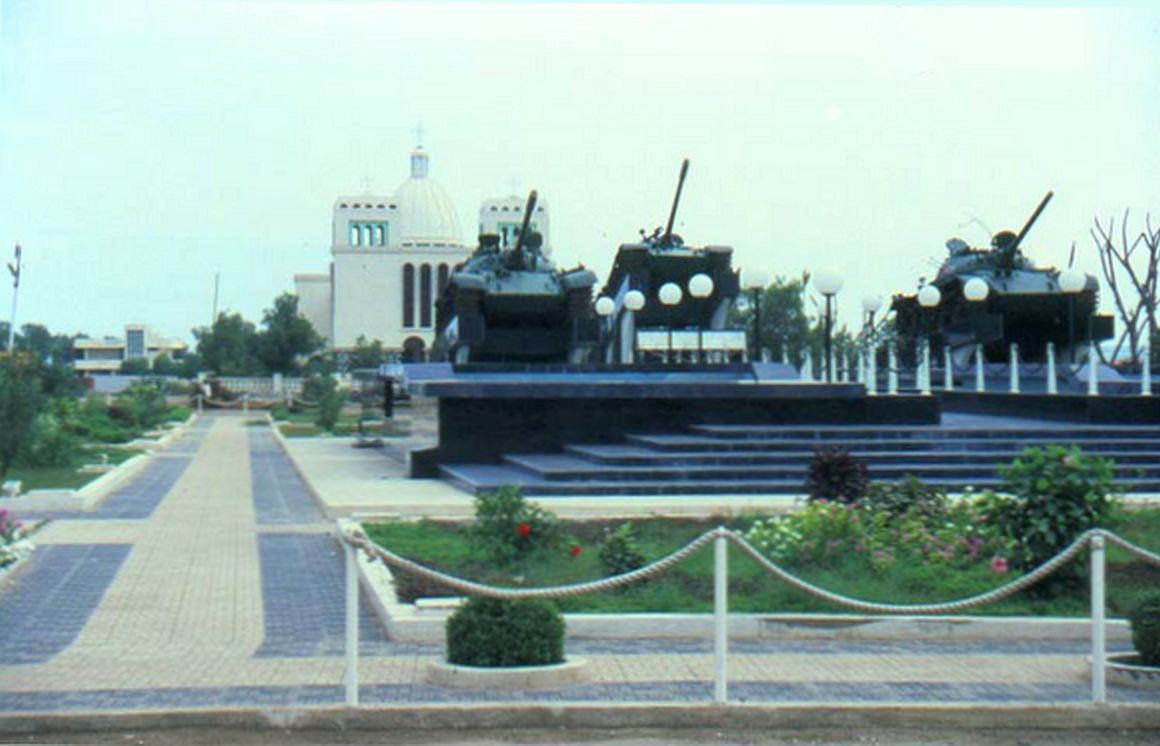
The War Memory Square in Massawa.

The battle was commemorated by a memorial of three tanks in War Memory Square near the Massawa city centre on Taulud Island by the entrance to the causeway to the mainland. In 2004 on the fourteenth anniversary of the battle, Eritrea issued a set of two stamps and a three-stamp minisheet honoring the "Liberation of Massawa". Pictured on the 40c was the tank memorial with fountain, on the 50c was a speedboat (gunboat) with soldiers.

== See also ==
- First Battle of Massawa
- Eritrean War of Independence
