= Battle of Afabet =

1988 battle of the Eritrean War of Independence

- Part of the Eritrean War of Independence and the Ethiopian Civil War
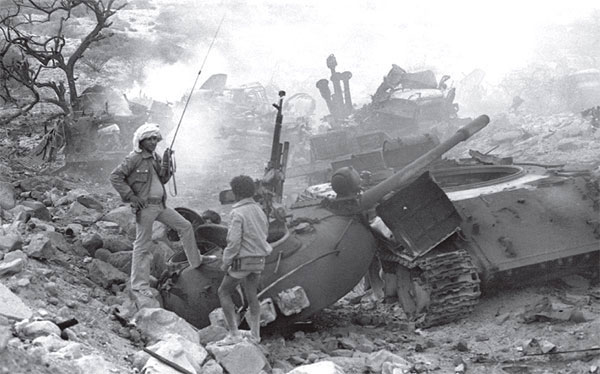
- Destroyed Ethiopian tanks after the battle
Date	17–20 March 1988
Location	Afabet, Ethiopia 16.183333°N 38.683333°E
Result	EPLF victory

Belligerents
EPLF	Ethiopia; Soviet Union (advisors)

Commanders and leaders
Mesfin Hagos; Gerezgiher Andemariam	(Ethiopia) Getaneh Haile (Ethiopia) Wubetu Tsegaye

Strength
15,000–20,000	15,223

Casualties and losses
4,000–5,000 killed 5,000 wounded	(Ethiopia); 8,000–9,000 killed 5,000 captured (Soviet Union); 1 killed 3 captured
- Location within Eritrea

The Battle of Afabet was a three-day battle fought from 17 March through 20 March 1988 in and around the town of Afabet, as part of the Eritrean War of Independence. The battle has been described as being the largest battle in Africa since the Second Battle of El Alamein. It has been described as the most significant battle in terms of military and political consequences since the Ethio-Somali War, alongside the 1989 Battle of Shire of the Ethiopian Civil War.

== Background ==
The Nadew Command was one of four commands, or army corps, of the Ethiopian Second Revolutionary Army. Led by Colonel Getaneh Haile, it was composed of three infantry divisions and accompanying support units, and some sources state it had between 20,000 and 22,000 soldiers. Gebru Tareke, noted that the morale of the soldiers was at an all-time low, and none of the divisions "had even half of the numbers that would normally constitute an Ethiopian division – ten to twelve thousand men", quotes Ministry of Defense reports to state that there were 15,223 men in the three divisions.

The Eritrean People's Liberation Front (EPLF) had attacked the Nadew Command a few months previously, with limited success. On 8 December 1987, the EPLF attacked one of the divisions of the Command, the 22nd Mountain Division, with a force that may have contained as many as five infantry brigades, one mechanized battalion, and three heavy-weapon battalions. On the second day of the assault, Eritrean infiltrators destroyed the divisional control center. It required the assistance of the Nineteenth Mountain Infantry Division and the 45th Infantry Brigade to halt further advances and repel the EPLF forces. Ethiopian losses in this preliminary engagement were 242 killed, 291 wounded, and 615 missings; Eritrean losses have been estimated at 125 killed and 269 wounded. However, the Ethiopian side suffered even graver losses in the aftermath: on Mengistu Haile Mariam's order twenty senior officers were transferred and the commander of the Nadew Command, General Tariku Ayne, who had been absent from Afabet for medical treatment, was executed outside of Asmara on 15 February 1988. The death of one of Ethiopia's most prominent generals surprised even the EPLF, whose Radio of the Masses broadcast that the Derg had "cut off its right hand with its left hand". The 22nd Division was moved to Keren, and replaced with the Fourteenth Infantry Division.

== Battle ==
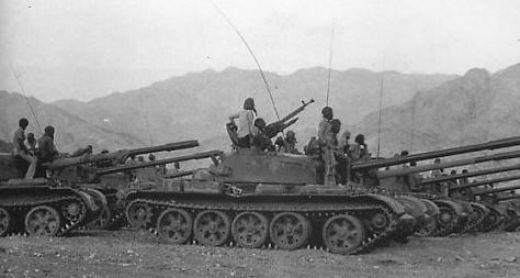
Eritrean rebels tanks, 1988.

On the morning of 17 March 1988, the EPLF deployed troops on three sides around Hedai Valley to encircle the Ethiopian garrison. The first unit attacked was the newly arrived Fourteenth Division. Upon their attack, the Ethiopian forces began to withdraw but were cut off. The battle continued while the Ethiopian garrison from Keren tried to reinforce their position, which was thwarted by the EPLF.

A stumbling block for the EPLF was on the left flank, where their Eighty-fifth Division was held up by the dogged resistance of the Ethiopian Twenty-ninth Mechanized Brigade. It fought without reinforcement for most of a day until its commander gambled on a retreat to Afabet. Lacking time for careful reconnaissance before its withdrawal, the brigade was halted when a tank and truck were disabled by Eritrean 100mm guns, the burning vehicles blocking the road. The Ethiopians were forced to destroy their weaponry to prevent them from falling into EPLF hands. Ethiopian aircraft even bombed their own troops. The commander of the Second Revolutionary Army came to the battlefield himself to supervise opening the road to Afabet "until he allegedly 'escaped on a camel' just before the fall of the garrison." Once the Ethiopian troops were routed in Hedai Valley, the EPLF stormed and captured Afabet. As the town was a major garrison the EPLF also captured a large cache of weapons in addition to those captured in the valley.

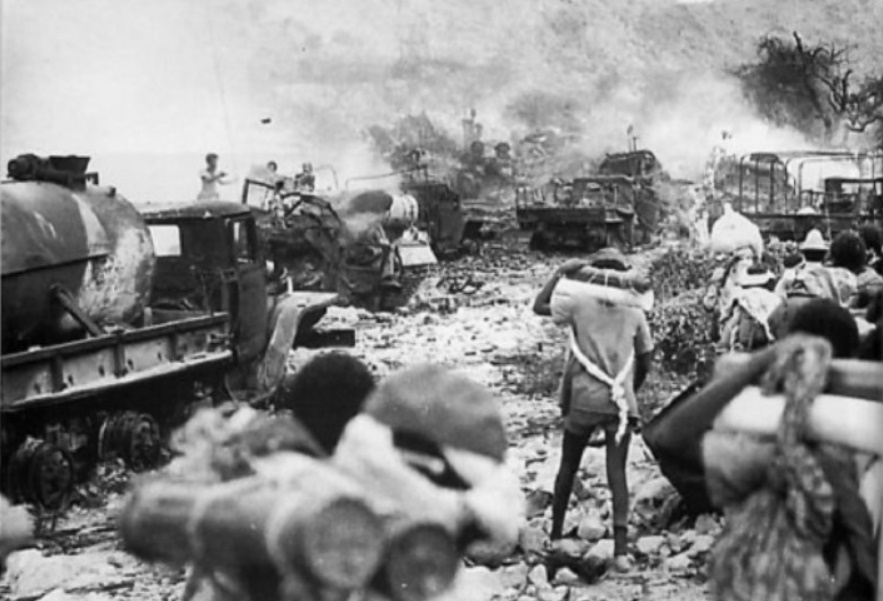
Destroyed Ethiopian armoured column.

Killion estimates that by the end of the three-day battle, the EPLF had killed over 8,000 Ethiopian soldiers. After losing Afabet, on the following days the Ethiopian troops abandoned the towns of Tesseneiei, Barentu and Agordat, since they thought they could not defend them any longer, and concentrated most of their forces on Keren.

== Aftermath ==
Shortly after the defeat, Berhane Woldemichael wrote in the Review of African Political Economy that the loss of Afabet had severely weakened the Ethiopian military. Ethiopian forces lost several divisions of experienced troops and abandoned a substantial stockpile of weapons intended for a planned offensive against the Eritrean People's Liberation Front (EPLF). According to Woldemichael, the offensive had been planned with the assistance of Soviet military advisers, and the EPLF's victory disrupted these preparations. The capture of three Soviet military personnel and the death of another during the battle also provided evidence of direct Soviet involvement, despite the Soviet Union's denials of such involvement in Eritrea.

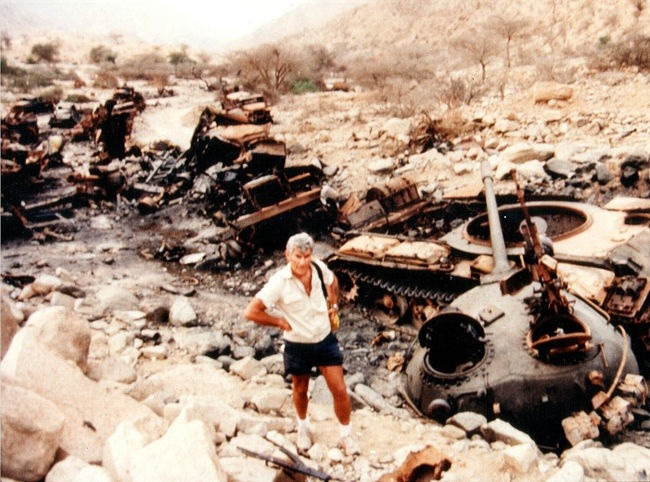
Destroyed Ethiopian tanks

Historian Basil Davidson regarded the EPLF's victory over the Nadew Command as one of the most significant victories achieved by a national liberation movement since the Vietnamese victory at Dien Bien Phu. The battle has also been described as the largest military engagement in Africa since the Second Battle of El Alamein. Historian Gebru Tareke, however, has questioned the comparison with Dien Bien Phu, noting that Davidson made his assessment while visiting the EPLF in the field and that Ethiopian forces continued to fight, sometimes vigorously, for another three years after the battle. Tareke summarized the distinction by concluding that, "From a global perspective, Afabet was an event whereas Dien Bien Phu was eventful."

The Battle of Afabet also had implications for the Somaliland War of Independence in neighbouring Somalia. The defeat of Ethiopian forces at the Nadew Command in March 1988 contributed to the Ethiopian government's decision to reduce its military commitments elsewhere and reach an agreement with the Somali government led by Siad Barre. On 3 April 1988, Ethiopian president Mengistu Haile Mariam and Barre signed an agreement under which both countries pledged to cease supporting each other's armed opposition movements. The agreement threatened the position of the Somali National Movement (SNM), a predominantly Isaaq movement that had used Ethiopian territory as a base for operations against the Somali government.

Concerned that the agreement would deprive it of its bases and supply routes in Ethiopia, the SNM launched a major offensive in northern Somalia in May 1988, targeting the cities of Burao and Hargeisa. The 1988 Hargeisa–Burao offensive marked a significant escalation in the Somaliland conflict, as the SNM shifted from operations conducted primarily from bases in Ethiopia to large-scale attacks inside Somalia. The offensive also contributed to the subsequent intensification of the conflict between the SNM and the Somali government. The relationship between the Battle of Afabet, the Ethiopian–Somali agreement and the SNM offensive illustrates how developments in the Eritrean war affected regional military and political dynamics, although the extent to which Afabet directly influenced the outbreak of the Somali Civil War remains a matter of historical interpretation.
