= Fall of the Derg regime =

1991 downfall of the People's Democratic Republic of Ethiopia

- Part of Ethiopian Civil War
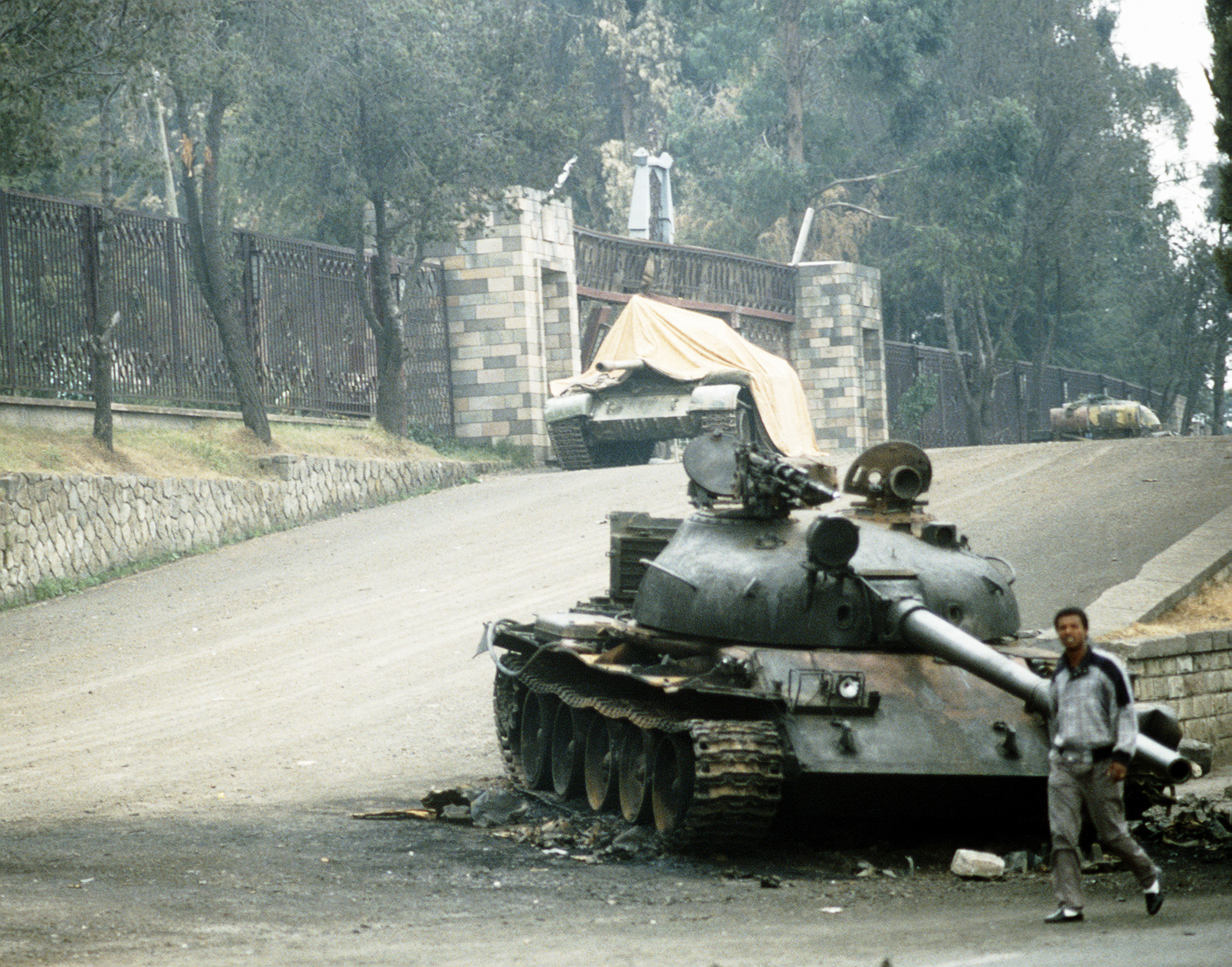
- A destroyed T-62 tank outside the Presidential Palace shortly after the fall
Date	28 May 1991; 35 years ago
Location	Addis Ababa, Ethiopia
Result	EPRDF victory: EPRDF took control of Addis Ababa; Mengistu Haile Mariam fled to Zimbabwe; Arrest of other Derg officials; EPRDF ordered 24-hour curfew; PDRE replaced with the Transitional Government of Ethiopia

Belligerents
Ethiopian People's Revolutionary Democratic Front	People's Democratic Republic of Ethiopia

The fall of the Derg regime was a military campaign that resulted in the defeat of the ruling Marxist–Leninist military junta, the Derg, by the rebel coalition Ethiopian People's Revolutionary Democratic Front (EPRDF) on 28 May 1991 in Addis Ababa, ending the Ethiopian Civil War.

The Derg in 1974 had taken power after deposing Emperor Haile Selassie and the Solomonic dynasty, an imperial dynasty of the Ethiopian Empire that began in 1270. The Derg suffered from insurgencies by different factions of separatist rebel groups since its early years, beginning with the Ethiopian Civil War. The 1983–1985 famine, the Red Terror, and resettlement and villagization made the Derg unpopular with the majority of Ethiopians tending to support insurgent groups like the Tigray People's Liberation Front (TPLF) and Eritrean People's Liberation Front (EPLF).

With the establishment of the People's Democratic Republic of Ethiopia in 1987, the Derg, led by Mengistu Haile Mariam, was subdued by rebel groups due in part to lack of support from the Soviet Union since 1990.

== Pre-Derg separation movement: 1958–1974 ==
In September 1962, Eritrea was federated with Ethiopia under Emperor Haile Selassie as the ninth province of the Ethiopian Empire after being ruled as Italy's colony and then put under British administration during the Second World War in 1941. As a result, the Eritrean Liberation Movement (ELM) was formed in Sudan in 1958 to fight for independence.

Haile Selassie's regime became more authoritarian; political parties were persecuted and freedom of speech and press generally suppressed, and the native languages of Eritrea were banned in favor of Amharic.

Although Eritrean resistance prevailed throughout the Emperor's reign, the turning point came in the formation of armed separatist groups and movements. Muslim herdsman lowlanders often cemented separatist movements while Christians in the highlands of Eritrea favored joining with Ethiopia. In July 1960, the ELM formed the Eritrean Liberation Front (ELF) in Cairo, and was majority-Muslim. The number of attacks toward the imperial Ethiopian government went from 4 in 1962 to 27 in 1966. The ELF then grew its armed wing, the Eritrean Liberation Army, in early 1967, forcing the Ethiopian government to deploy two brigades in a three-phase counterinsurgency operation codenamed "Wegaw" (lit. 'trash').

== Early to mid-civil war: 1974–1987 ==
Map during the Ethiopian Civil War showing insurgent strategic route in advance of Addis Ababa

The Provisional Military Administrative Committee, also known as the Derg, seized power following a coup d'état against Emperor Haile Selassie, ending the empire's administration and installing a military dictatorship in 1974. Upon neutralizing the ELM, three factions reorganized to establish the Eritrean People's Liberation Front (EPLF) in 1974, and its military wing the Eritrean Liberation Front Army (EPLA). In 1977, Ethiopia's central military committee elected Mengistu Haile Mariam as the chairman of the Derg while disengaging military posts in Eritrea. The EPLF and ELF launched a series of offensives to gain control of most parts of Eritrea other than Asmara, Massawa, Asseb, Barentu, and Senafe. In February 1975, another insurgency group, the Tigray People's Liberation Front (TPLF), was formed in response to the Derg's withdrawal from these areas.

The TPLF's first attacks took place in August 1975, and the organization steadily grew its support from local peasants and the Tigrayan populace as a whole. During the TPLF's early period of formation, the group fought with rivals in lieu of the central government. In 1978, the Derg countered a formal invasion of the eastern region of Ogaden by Somalia, which claimed the region as an integral part of Greater Somalia.

The EPLF and ELF were successful in seizing 80% of Eritrea, but the Derg soon diverted their attention to Eritrea after their victory against Somalia, fearing the loss of the Red Sea and the isolation of Ethiopia. In early 1978, they organized 90,000 men under the Second Revolutionary Army (SRA) and launched comprehensive attacks against the EPLF and ELF. The Derg achieved control of southern and central Eritrea after their June 1978 military operation, and resumed offensives in November 1978 to capture Agordat, Afabet and Keren.

The Derg secured the road connecting Massawa with Asmara, and heavily besieged EPLA fortifications by June 1983. Although the government made significant investments in infrastructure rehabilitation projects and villagization of rural population by the early 1980s, the Red Terror and 1983–1985 famine rendered the Derg unpopular among the whole Ethiopian population, and the rebel groups gained broad support. The Derg accused famine relief organizations of assisting the insurgent groups. By the end of 1984, the TPLF controlled most of the rural area of Tigray, while Adigrat and Shire were de facto under siege. The EPLF ceased its support for the TPLF by blockading their supply routes from Sudan in 1985. The Derg advanced its military to Eritrea, and the Tigrayan insurgents were emboldened as a potential threat.

The EPLF began their Stealth Offensive and Red Star campaigns in June 1982, and retook Teseney, and Aligider, thus capturing the land connection between Sahel Redoubt and Sudan in January 1984. Subsequently, they retook the Ethiopian military outpost in the Alghena area, on the coast of the Red Sea a week later. By May 1986, the Asmara–Massawa road was destroyed, while Ethiopian air bases and artillery were burned by the insurgents.

== From the PDR to the fall of Addis Ababa: 1987–1991 ==
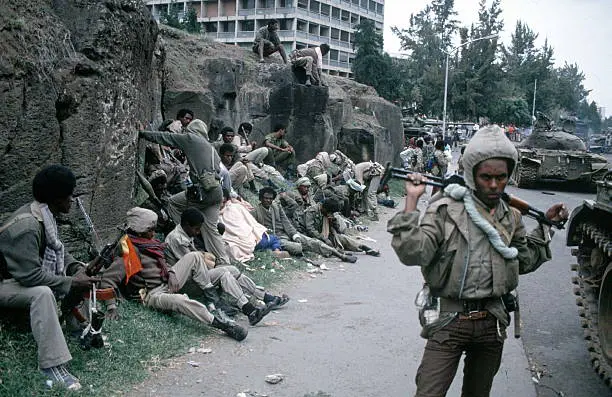
EPRDF fighters in Addis Ababa

In September 1987, Mengistu proclaimed Ethiopia as a communist state known as the People's Democratic Republic of Ethiopia. The Workers' Party, dominated by surviving Derg members, became the only legal party. The same year, the Amhara anti-government opposition group known as the Ethiopian People's Democratic Movement (EPDM) was formed. Together with the TPLF, they established a coalition known as the Ethiopian People's Revolutionary Democratic Front (EPDRF) in 1989, with Meles Zenawi serving as chairman of both the TPLF and EPDM. Mengistu banned the Ethiopian media from using the terms glasnost and perestroika, defying the Soviet president Mikhail Gorbachev, whom Mengistu is believed to have distrusted. Gorbachev sent hardline communist troops from Moscow along with 1 billion U.S. dollars in military aid in the next three consecutive years.

Gorbachev ultimately told Mengistu that he would cut off the flow of equipment to the Derg by 1990. By the end of the 1980s, the insurgents accepted the importance of mixed economy, multi-party democracy, and open society over socialist dogma in order to defeat the Derg, seeking approval from the United States and allies. In early February 1990, the EPLF successfully captured all of Massawa, de-linking the road and Mengistu's army from Asmara and central Eritrea.

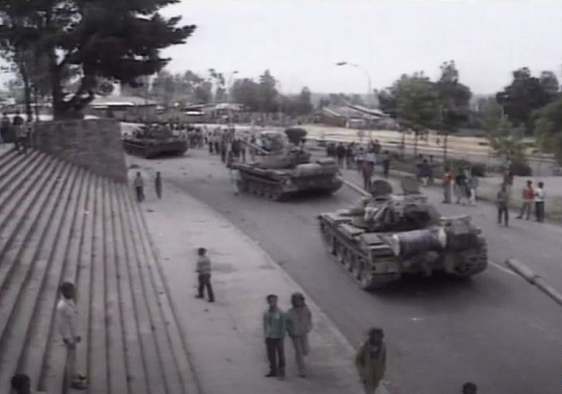
Tanks of the EPRDF in Addis Ababa, May 1991

In early 1990, Mengistu provided for Operation Solomon, the second round of Ethiopian Jewish emigrations to Israel. The Israeli lobbying campaign culminated in Mengistu's visit with the Israeli foreign minister Moshe Arens in Washington in February. Many Jewish organizations and leaders from the United States Congress credited Mengistu for his role in the lobbying effort.

On 5 March 1990, Mengistu delivered a lengthy speech to address threats in the country, and requested ideas for reform. From 17 to 21 January 1991, the EPRDF held its first congress in Tigray. The final report was published on 10 March, containing old-fashioned Marxist rhetoric: it advocated a "People's Republic" dominated by "workers and peasants" in repudiation of "capitalists with foreign sponsorships" and "feudals". Leader Meles was concerned about cooperation with the Oromo Liberation Front in the future of Ethiopia, as the OLF had a record of harassing settlers, abduction relief workers and Derg outposts.

At the end of January 1991, the EPRDF commenced Operation Tewedros to liberate the Amhara. In early March 1991, the Afar Liberation Front became an ally of the EPRDF without formally joining. In the same month, they captured Bahir Dar through Gojjam and the Blue Nile before crossing Wollo via its capital Dessie. By this time, the Derg had opted to resist. They marched to Shewa, Welega, and Addis Ababa; in April, they took Oromo including its capital of Welega, Nekemte, and moved to Gimbi, by which time the OLF and EPRDF were on the verge of agreement.

On 27 May, the rebels had almost controlled the southwest cities such as Jimma, Agaro and Gambela amid talks in London. The Derg immediately fell into disarray and evacuated from the area. On 28 May 1991, the EPRDF took control of Addis Ababa and called a summit to begin formation of the Transitional Government of Ethiopia. Mengistu and some other Derg officials fled the country and still more were arrested. Mengistu fled to Zimbabwe, where he still lives.
