= Eritrean People's Liberation Front =

Far-left paramilitary group of Eritrea (1973–1994)

- Tigrinya name: ህዝባዊ ግንባር ሓርነት ኤርትራ; Hizibawī Ginibari Harineti Ēritira
- Arabic name: الجبهة الشعبية لتحرير إريتريا; Al-Jabha al-Sha'bia li-Tahrir Iiritria
- Italian name: Fronte di Liberazione del Popolo Eritreo
- Abbreviation: EPLF
- Chairman: Romodan Mohammed Nur; Isaias Afwerki
- Founded: 1 August 1973 (53 years, 79 days)
- Dissolved: 16 February 1994 (32 years, 245 days)
- Split from: Eritrean Liberation Front
- Succeeded by: People's Front for Democracy and Justice
- Headquarters: Nakfa (1976–1991); Asmara (1991–1994)
- Newspaper: Vanguard, Sagem, and Adulis
- Youth wing: National Union of Eritrean Youth and Students
- Armed wing: Eritrean People's Liberation Army
- Ideology: Eritrean nationalism; Left-wing nationalism; Secularism; 1973–1987: Communism; Marxism–Leninism; Maoism; Socialism
- Political position: Left-wing; 1973–1987: Far-left

Party flag

The Eritrean People's Liberation Front (EPLF), colloquially known as Shabia, was an Eritrean separatist Marxist–Leninist paramilitary and political organization that sought Eritrea's secession from Ethiopia during the Eritrean War of Independence, which eventually led to the independence of Eritrea from Ethiopia in 1993.

A splinter group that split from the Eritrean Liberation Front (ELF) as a left-wing nationalist organization, it emerged in 1973 during the final years of Emperor Haile Selassie's rule. After the Ethiopian Revolution the following year, which brought the Derg regime to power, the EPLF and ELF continued their struggle for independence. By 1977, the EPLF overran the Ethiopian army in much of Eritrea. Following the Ogaden War, the Soviet Union began supporting the Derg against the Eritreans, which turned back their advance during the late 1970s.

Several major Ethiopian military offensives launched in the 1980s aimed at finally crushing the EPLF, such as the Red Star Campaign, failed persistently and emboldened the Eritrean resistance. During the Battle of Afabet in 1988, the EPLF inflicted a crushing blow to the Ethiopian government forces in Eritrea and went on the offensive. Another major victory was achieved during the Second Battle of Massawa in 1990, which marked the beginning of the end of Ethiopian rule in Eritrea.

In alliance with the Tigray People's Liberation Front (TPLF), the EPLF helped overthrow the Derg regime in May 1991. Following the 1993 independence referendum, the organization transformed into a political body in 1994, renaming itself the People's Front for Democracy and Justice (PFDJ), which remains the sole legal party in Eritrea.

== History ==
=== Origins ===
In 1967, thirty-three men underwent six months of training in China, including Isaias Afwerki, an engineering student who had left Haile Selassie I University (Addis Ababa University) in 1966 to join the Eritrean Liberation Front (ELF), and Romodan Mohammed Nur, who had become commissar of the Fourth Zone after military training in Syria. Cuba also received ten individuals, including Ibrahim Affa, a skilled former marine commando, in 1968. Upon their return, these men improved the combat capabilities of the front but also intensified internal conflicts and feuds.

=== 1970s ===
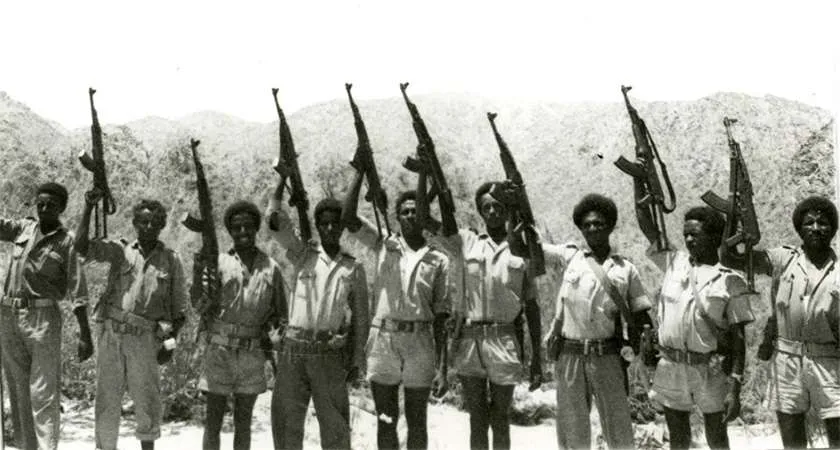
EPLF fighters.

Disillusioned with incompetent and feuding leaders, many young dissidents left the ELF, forming competing organizations. Political disputes began to destroy the ELF from the inside, and some dissidents who did not leave the organization were killed. Efforts at rectification and unity failed, leading to the emergence of the Eritrean People’s Liberation Front (EPLF) in August 1973, officially known as Shaabia ("popular" in its Arabic abbreviation) in 1977. Led by Isaias and Ramadan, the EPLF found refuge in the mountains of Sahel, successfully repelling repeated assaults from Nakfa, a garrison town on a high plateau. In order to avoid repeating ELF’s mistakes, they ensured members were not only being trained militarily but politically as well. All members received the same education, no matter their background, to maintain a sense of equality.

The EPLF faced immediate challenges, including a declaration of war by the ELF in mid-1972, leading to the "first civil war" ending inconclusively in 1974. Internal dissension within the EPLF, fueled by accusations of authoritarian practices and military shortcomings, was quelled by Isaias, resulting in the execution of eleven members in August 1974. This event contributed to the centralization and security focus of the EPLF. The Ethiopian Revolution shifted the balance in Eritrea, and a temporary truce allowed joint offensives by the fronts in 1976.

The First Congress of the EPLF occurred in January 1977 and formally set out the policies of this new organization. At this first meeting Romodan Mohammed Nur was elected Secretary-General and Isaias as Assistant Secretary-General. This program specifically targeted a liberalization of women's rights as well as a broad educational policy for maintaining every language and improving literacy. It was also set out that the boundaries of an Eritrean state would be based on the colonial treaties of Italy.

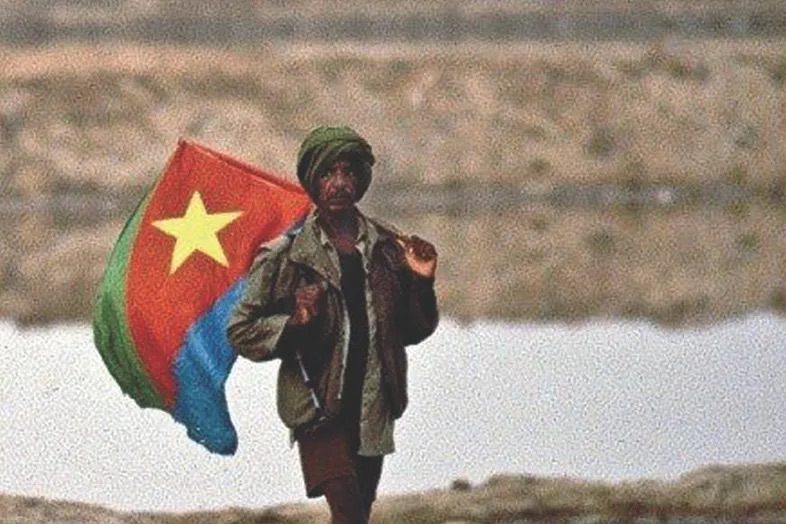
EPLF fighter.

From 1975 to 1977, the ELF and EPLF outnumbered the Ethiopian army and overran much of Eritrea. Only Asmara, Barentu, and the ports of Assab and Massawa remained under government control. With the road between them cut, however, Asmara and Massawa were effectively under siege. The hopes of a nationalist victory, raised by the insurgents’ achievements and fear of the Red Terror, drove thousands of young men and women to the fronts, principally to the EPLF. As most of the new recruits were Christian, highland society was no longer peripheral to the conflict. The success of the insurgents was due more to government weakness than their own strength. A counteroffensive in 1978 led to the EPLF's strategic withdrawal, establishing a defensive line in 1979.

Ethiopia had the advantage of Soviet support beginning in 1977, which totaled over $11 billion in military funding and arms by the end of the war. On the other hand, the EPLF was scraping by monetarily and militarily, with most of their funds coming from the Eritrean diaspora and most of their supplies from seizing Ethiopian weapons after battles.

=== 1980s ===
The fronts faced a lull in fighting in 1980–81, with the army engaged in operations against rebels. The uneasy peace between the fronts crumbled in August 1980, leading to the "second civil war," where the ELF was decisively defeated a year later with assistance from the Tigray People's Liberation Front (TPLF). Some ELF fighters joined the winning side, and those in Sudan were disarmed. The ELF ceased as an effective organization by the mid-1980s but continued sporadic operations in Eritrea. The EPLF emerged as the dominant force, defeating major operations in 1982 and 1983. In 1988, the EPLF achieved a historic victory, signaling the defeat of the military regime and the path to Eritrean independence. The organizational structure and guiding ideas played a crucial role in the EPLF's success.

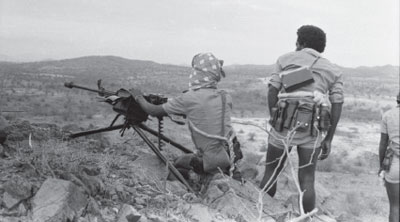
EPLF fights with Ethiopian forces.

One of these guiding ideas was the EPLF's focus on solving the problem politically. For example, in November 1980, the EPLF published their seven-point peace plan in an effort to create a focused political goal. At the top of the list was the need for a national referendum to allow the Eritrean people the right to self-determination. Another point called for a ceasefire to ensure the safety of the voters and the country. However, instead of accepting the plan, the Derg ignored the proposed plan and increased their attacks.

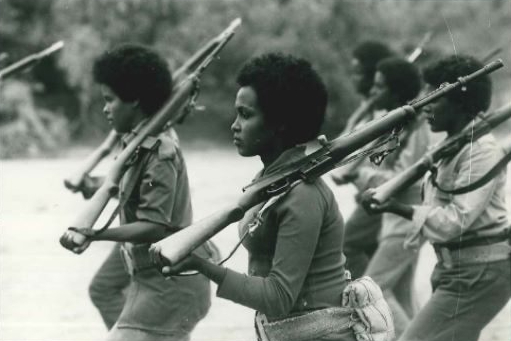
EPLF's women fighters.

Between February and June 1982, over 80,000 Ethiopian troops launched a series of offensives known as the Red Star Campaign in an attempt to crush the EPLF. Despite these efforts, the government forces were thwarted by the EPLF. Rather than crushing the EPLF, the unsuccessful operation had the opposite effect, strengthening it. This outcome led to an increased fervor among the Eritrean people, who rallied behind the EPLF.

Growing from around four hundred men organized in squads, the EPLA became a formidable force by the mid-1980s. The primary combat component was the strategic mobile forces, consisting of permanent units like brigades and divisions. The smallest operational unit was the mesre (squad), followed by ganta (platoon), hayli (company), and bottoloni (battalion). The brigade, comprising three battalions, was the largest unit until the mid-1980s when it was surpassed by the division. Remarkably, nearly a third of the EPLA's total force and 15 percent of its frontline combat units were women, challenging traditional gender roles. However, women remained underrepresented in leadership positions. Specialized units within the EPLA effectively employed guerrilla and conventional tactics. By the end of the 1980s, the EPLA consisted of six divisions, fourteen infantry brigades, four mechanized brigades, and various specialized units.

The EPLF, led by a general staff headed by Sebhat Ephrem after 1987, emphasized decentralization and local initiative during defensive guerrilla tactics. Command became more centralized during conventional offensives. The insurgents relied on light and portable equipment, with the AK-47 being the primary individual weapon. Leaving the EPLF was practically impossible, and instances of kidnapping and forcible conscription were reported. Child soldiers, drafted as young as ten, were used between 1979 and 1983 but this policy was abandoned due to internal and external criticism. While the EPLF had ties with Somalia it did not develop close ties to the Barre regime, though EPLF members like Isias Afwerki travelled abroad on Somali passports. In general, Somalia provided "very limited" material support to the Eritrean insurgents.

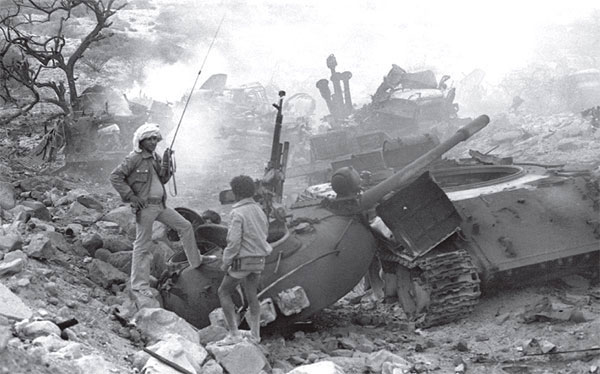
Destroyed Ethiopian tanks after battle of Afabet, where EPLF won, 1988.

The Second Congress in 1987, brought together the EPLF and the Eritrean Liberation Front/Central Leadership (also sometimes referred to as Central Command, CC) in what was called the Unity Congress. This was the culmination of negotiations over three years which had brought together the two fighting forces in October 1986, under a unified command. On this congress, Isaias Afewerki replaced secretary-general Ramadan Nur. Subsequently, the movement abandoned most of its formerly Marxist–Leninist ideology, in favour of an own revolutionary left-wing concept and a more comprehensive and pragmatic approach to unite all Eritrean nationalists. This approach was entitled the "National Democratic Program," and included objectives for the creation and development of Eritrea. It consisted of an 11-point plan, the first point of which was the forming of the nation. The following points emphasized protecting political, social, and religious rights, with the last being a call for a neutral position in foreign policy.

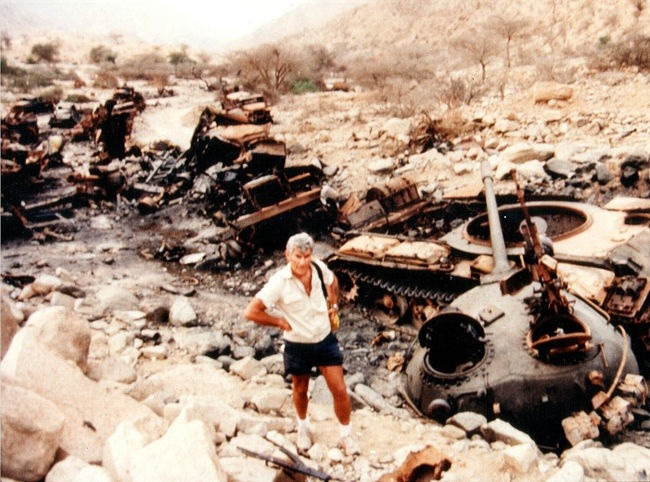
Destroyed Ethiopian tanks, 1988.

The EPLF won its most resounding victory in March 1988 at the Battle of Afabet. It destroyed the most formidable Ethiopian garrison in northern Eritrea and marked a pivotal moment, setting off a chain of events leading to total victory three years later. After Afabet the front became a virtually unstoppable insurgent force as it began its campaign aimed for the strategic port of Massawa. The Ethiopian army, caught in a long-simmering crisis and plagued by internal divisions, underestimated the resilience, skill, and adaptability of the rebels. Af Abet, one of the three crucial turning points in the Eritrean war, severely weakened the military's capacity to wage war and foreshadowed the downfall of the dictatorship, paving the way for Eritrean independence. The battle's strategic significance has been likened to the Vietnamese triumph against the French at Điện Biên Phủ. As its success grew the EPLF began attracting a wave of new support.

=== 1990s ===
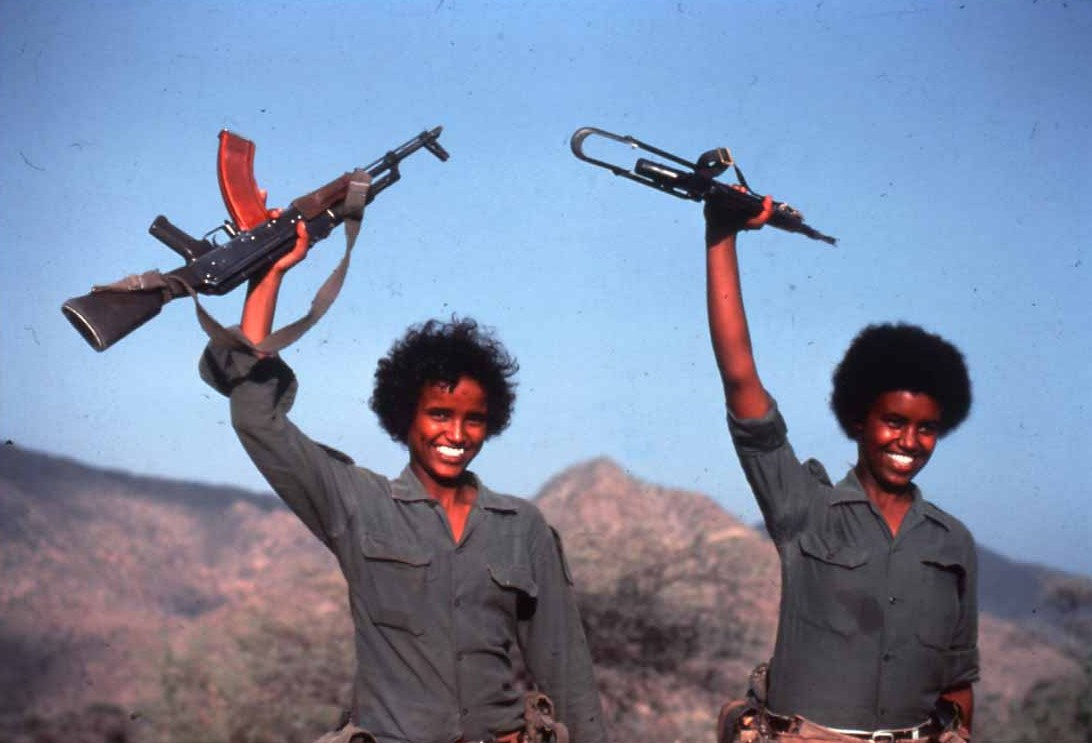
EPLF fighters celebrate fall of the Derg regime.

After another defeat at Shire in 1989, the EPLF went on the offensive in 1990 directed at Massawa. This offensive was known as Massawa and resulted in EPLF seizing the city and defeating the Ethiopian garrison. The defeat was complete, catastrophic, and irreversible. Even the vengeful bombing, which persisted until the end of March and resulted in the destruction of numerous historic Islamic buildings, could not alter the disastrous outcome. Isaias Afewerki, leader of the victorious army, concurs, acknowledging it as a victory of the greatest strategic value in the history of the struggle.

The Third and last Congress of the EPLF was held in 1994 in Asmara. It was important as it converted the Front from a military organization to a purely political movement. At the time, the organization had 95,000 members. At this Congress, the name of the organization was changed to the People's Front for Democracy and Justice (PFDJ).
