= Mensah (surname) =

Mensah is a Ghanaian surname. Notable people with the surname include:

- A. S. O. Mensah, Ghanaian politician 1969–1972
- Abena Durowaa Mensah (born 1977), Ghanaian politician
- Abraham Mensah (born 2003), Ghanaian boxer
- Agyenim Boateng Mensah (born 1996), Ghanaian footballer
- Akwetey Mensah (born 1983), Ghanaian footballer
- Albert Kobina Mensah (fl. from 2021), Ghanaian environmental scientist, researcher and author
- Alfred Mensah (born 1999), Ghanaian footballer
- Amewu Mensah (born 1977), German high jumper
- Andrew Kingsford Mensah (born 1955), Ghanaian politician
- Andrews Pomeyie Mensah (born 1983), Ghanaian footballer
- Anne Mensah, British broadcasting executive
- Anthony Mensah (born 1972), Ghanaian footballer
- Atto Mensah (born 1964), Dutch–Sierra Leonean football coach and player
- Baba Mensah (born 1994), Ghanaian footballer
- Barbara Mensah (fl. from 2005), British judge of Ghanaian descent
- Ben Mensah (Benjamin Mensah, born 1983), Ghanaian footballer
- Benard Kwaku Mensah (born 1924), Ghanaian politician
- Benjamin Mensah (born 2002), Italian footballer
- Bernard Mensah (disambiguation), the name of several people
- Betty Krosbi Mensah (born 1980), Ghanaian politician
- Brobbey Mensah (Owusu Mensah, born 1934), Ghanaian sprinter
- Cédric Mensah (born 1989), Togolese footballer
- Charles Mensah (1948–2009), Gabonese filmmaker
- Charles Nii Armah Mensah Jr., (born 1984), known by his stage name Shatta Wale, Ghanaian reggae-dancehall artist
- Charlotte Mensah (born 1970), British/Ghanaian hairstylist
- Collins Mensah (born 1961), Ghanaian sprinter
- Daniel Mensah (born 1968), also known as Hello, Ga carpenter and fantasy coffin artist
- D. K. Mensah (Daniel Ato Kwamina Mensah, 1953–2020), Ghanaian banker, economist and educator
- Darian Mensah (born n 2005), American football player
- David Yaw Mensah (born 1943), Ghanaian politician
- Davis Mensah (born 1991), Italian footballer
- Derrick Mensah (born 1995), Ghanaian footballer
- E. T. Mensah (Emmanuel Tettey Mensah, 1919–1996), Ghanaian musician
- Ekow Mensah (fl. from 2015), Ghanaian social entrepreneur and speaker
- Emmanuel (disambiguation), the name of several people
- Enoch Teye Mensah (1946–2023), Ghanaian politician
- Erica Ntiamoah Mensah (fl. from 2021), Ghanaian doctor
- Essul Badu Mensah (born 1944), Ghanaian footballer
- Evans Mensah (disambiguation), the name of several people
- George Owusu Mensah (1959 or 1960 – 2024), Ghanaian gospel musician and pastor
- Gideon Mensah (disambiguation), the name of several people
- Gifty Mensah (born 1998), Ghanaian badminton player
- Herbert Mensah (fl. from 1994), Ghanaian businessman and sports administrator
- Ibrahim Mensah (born 1995), Ghanaian footballer
- Isaac Mensah (disambiguation), the name of several people
- Ivan Anokye Mensah, (born 2004), Ghanaian footballer
- Jacob Mensah (born 2000), English-Ghanaian footballer
- Jeff Mensah, (born 1992) Danish footballer
- Jeremiah Mensah (born 2008), German footballer
- Joe Mensah (died 2003), Ghanaian singer and musician
- Joe Mensah (boxer) (born 1945), Nigerian boxer
- John Mensah (disambiguation), the name of several people
- Jonathan Mensah (born 1990), Ghanaian footballer
- Joseph Mensah (disambiguation), the name of several people
- Kent Mensah (fl. from 2009), Ghanaian online journalist
- Kevin Mensah (disambiguation), the name of several people
- King Mensah (born 1971), Togolese musician
- Kissiwaa Mensah (born 2005), British sprinter
- Kofi Mensah (born 1978), Dutch-Ghanaian footballer
- Kofi Mensah (footballer, born 1996), Ghanaian footballer
- Kofi Nahaje Sarkodie-Mensah, known as Kofi Kingston (born 1981), Ghanaian-American professional wrestler
- Kojo Mensah (born 1985), Ghanaian basketball player
- Krosbi Mensah (born 1947), Ghanaian politician
- Kwesi Adofo-Mensah (born 1981), American football general manager for the Minnesota Vikings
- Mads Mensah Larsen (born 1991), Danish handball player
- Maestro Mensah (fl. 2016), Ghanaian footballer
- Mary Mensah (born 1963), Ghanaian sprinter
- Mawuli Mensah (born 2003), Ghanaian footballer
- Maxwell Mensah (born 1997), Ghanaian footballer
- Michael Mensah (born 1981), Ghanaian footballer
- Mohammed Martin Mensah (born 1981), Ghanaian footballer
- Moïse Mensah (1934–2019), Beninese politician and international administrator
- Moses Mensah (born 1978), Ghanaian footballer
- Moses Mensah (footballer, born 1998), Ghanaian footballer
- Muzic Mensah (Lawrence Mensah, born 1978), Ghanaian highlife singer, farmer, trader and philanthropist
- Nana Mensah (fl. 2000s), Ghanaian American actress, writer, and director
- Nana Appiah Mensah (born 1986), Ghanaian businessman and fraudster
- Nathan Mensah (born 1998), Ghanaian basketball player
- Nelson Mensah (born 1973), Ghanaian footballer
- Nii Abbey Mensah (born 1973), Ghanaian media executive and publisher
- Nii Odoi Mensah (died 2016), Ghanaian actor
- Omenaa Mensah (born 1979), Ghanaian-Polish television presenter
- Oro Mensah (Oliver Sauter, born 1995), Nigerian wrestler
- Otis Mensah (fl. from 2015), British alternative hip-hop and spoken word artist
- Paul Mensah (born 1999), Ghanaian footballer
- Peter Mensah (born 1959), Ghanaian-Canadian actor
- Philip Bright Mensah (fl. from 2019), Ghanaian judge
- Philomena Mensah (born 1975), Ghanaian-Canadian sprinter
- Pops Mensah-Bonsu (born 1983), British basketball executive and former player
- Raphael Assibey-Mensah (born 1999), German footballer
- Richard Oteng Mensah (fl. 2000–01), Ghanaian footballer
- Richie Mensah (born 1986), Ghanaian singer-songwriter and record producer
- Robert Mensah (1939–1971), Ghanaian footballer who played as a goalkeeper
- Robert Kwame Mensah (born 1935), Ghanaian politician and teacher
- Ropapa Mensah (born 1997), Ghanaian footballer
- Rudolf Mensah (born 2001), Ghanaian footballer
- Samuel Mensah (disambiguation), the name of several people
- Solomon Mensah (born 1997), Ghanaian footballer
- Stephan Mensah (born 2000), German footballer
- Stephen Nuamah Mensah (1914–unknown), Ghanaian politician
- Steven Mensah (born 2003), German footballer who plays for the Togo national team
- Sylvester A. Mensah (fl. from 1996), Ghanaian politician, writer and technocrat
- Thomas Mensah (disambiguation), the name of several people
- Timothy Amihere Mensah (born 1916), Ghanaian politician
- Tina Gifty Mensah (born 1964), Ghanaian politician
- Vic Mensa (Victor Kwesi Mensah, born 1993), American rapper and activist
- Victor Mensah (born 1985), Ghanaian footballer
- Vincent Mensah (1924–2010), Beninese Roman Catholic bishop
- William Mensah (born 1982), Ghanaian footballer

== See also ==
- Mensa (name), given name and surname
