= Mensa =

Tigre-speaking ethnic group of Eritrea

Mensa may refer to:

- Mensa International, an organization for people with a high intelligence quotient (IQ)
- Mensa (name), a name and list of people with the given name or surname
- Mensa (constellation), a constellation in the southern sky
- Mensa (ecclesiastical), a portion of church property that is appropriated to defray the expenses of either the prelate or the community that serves the church
- Mensa (geology), an extraterrestrial area of raised land

The Mensa' (Tigre: መንሳዕ; Arabic: منسع), also spelled Mensa or Mänsa', are a Tigre-speaking people of Eritrea. They are related to the Marya and to the Hazo and Tora peoples. The Mensa' are known for being divided by religion, with both Muslim and Christian sections.

== Divisions ==
Two main sections of the Mensa' appear in the historical sources: the Bet Abrehe and the Bet Eshaqan (Bayt Esheqan). The leader of a section held the title kantibay.

== History ==
=== Relations with the Nayebs ===
In the 18th and early 19th centuries the Mensa' were among the largest groups paying tribute to the Nayebs, the Ottoman-appointed rulers of Hirgigo on the coast near Massawa. A caravan route ran from the market village of 'Aylat, west of Massawa, to the country of the Bet Eshaqan.

Mensa' traditions recorded by the Swedish missionary K. G. Rodén show how the Nayebs intervened in the succession of local chiefs. After the death of kantibay Tesfamikael of the Bet Abrehe, his grandson Tedros and a rival from the 'Ad 'Alai clan competed for the office by offering cattle to Nayeb Hasan Idris. Tedros made the larger offer and was installed with the regalia of office. When he later failed to send tribute, the Nayeb marched against him and held him at Hirgigo for two years, despite a promise not to arrest him. Tedros was restored only after a new Nayeb, Muhammad 'Abd al-Rahim, took power, and he confirmed the new relationship through a marriage alliance and a gift of cattle. Mensa' chiefs in turn played the Nayebs and the Tigrinya-speaking highland rulers off against each other. In the 1850s and 1860s the Nayebs, often with Ottoman troops, mounted expeditions into Mensa' territory.

=== Religion ===
Like the Bet Asgede, the Marya and the Bet Juk, the Mensa' previously followed local forms of Christianity. Between the 1820s and the 1850s many of them converted to Islam, under the influence of the Ad Shaykh holy family and agents of the Nayebs. The Ad Shaykh brought followers among the Mensa' and the Marya into the Qadiriyya Sufi order. The Italian Catholic missionary Giuseppe Sapeto described the Mensa' and neighbouring recently converted communities in an account published in 1857.

Part of the Mensa' remained Christian. From the late 19th century the Swedish Evangelical Mission (Evangeliska Fosterlands-Stiftelsen), which had arrived at Massawa in 1866, ran a school at Gheleb.

== See also ==
- Tigre people
- Marya
- Bilen people
