= Tigre people =

Eritrean ethnic group

Tigre
ትግሬ (Tigre)

Regions with significant populations
- Eritrea: 1.1–1.8 million
- Sudan: 132,000

Languages
- Tigre

Religion
- Majority: Sunni Islam ~95% Minority: Christianity ~5%

Related ethnic groups
- Habesha • Tigrinya people • Tigrayans • Amhara

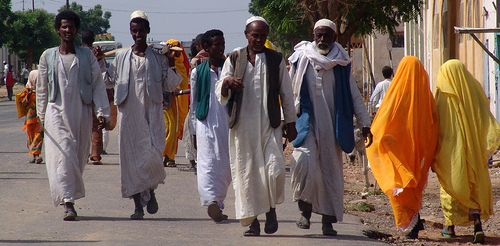
Tigre people

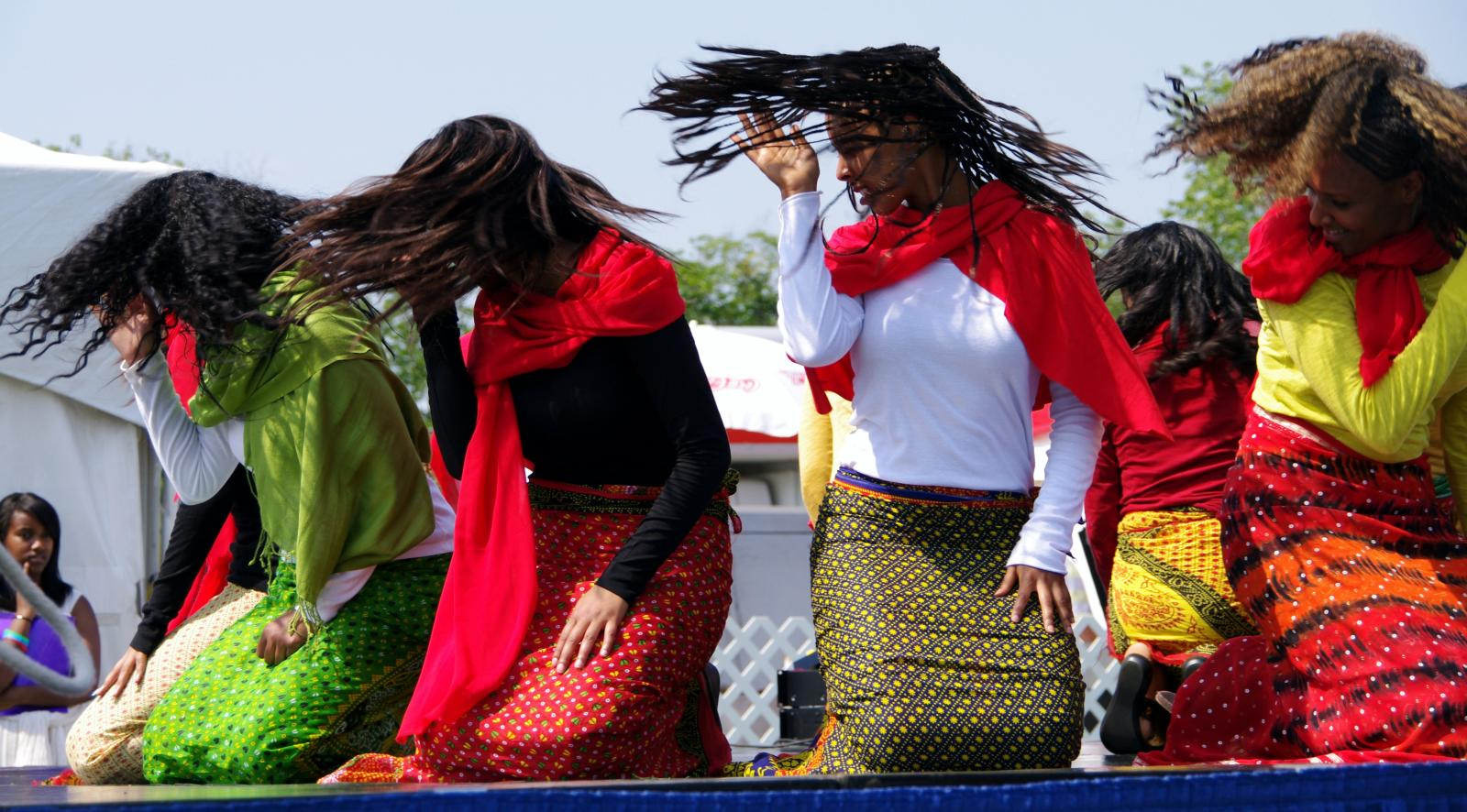
Traditional Tigre dancing

The Tigre people (Tigre: ትግሬ, romanized: tigrē) are the speakers of the Tigre language, a Semitic language. They live mainly in the lowlands and northern escarpments of Eritrea, with a smaller population in eastern Sudan. The name covers a number of groups of different origins that came to share the language, not a single descent group. Most Tigre are Sunni Muslims. In several Tigre-speaking societies the word tigre also named a subordinate serf class, as distinct from a ruling stratum, and this double meaning is a common source of confusion.

== History ==
The main Tigre-speaking groups include the Bet Asgede, the Mensa', the Marya, the Bet Juk and the Ad Shaykh, as well as many of the Beni-Amer. Part of the Beni-Amer speak Tigre, while others speak Beja.

=== Origins and migrations (to c. 1750) ===
Muslim influence reached the coast early. Arab Muslims occupied the Dahlak islands in the early 8th century, and a sultanate based there ruled in the 12th and 13th centuries.

Between the 16th and 19th centuries the Tigre-speaking lands formed a frontier zone contested by the highland Ethiopian state and the Funj Sultanate of Sennar, while the Ottoman presence was largely limited to the coast. The Bet Asgede moved from Akele Guzai to the Sahel, possibly during the wars of the 16th century. The Balaw, a Beja–Arab elite from the Suakin area, moved south at about the same time or earlier, and the emergence of the Beni-Amer is linked to their relationship with the Funj. Individual groups shifted between independence and paying tribute to neighbouring powers. Dependence was usually expressed through tribute, grazing rights and the appointment of chiefs.

=== Nā'ib dominance (c. 1750s–1840s) ===
The Nā'ibs, a Balaw-descended family that governed from Hergigo as Ottoman deputies, became the strongest power in the area in the second half of the 18th century. They held authority over all the pastoral Tigre-speaking groups of Semhar, the Sahel and the northern coast. The Nā'ibs controlled market villages such as 'Aylat, 'Asus and Gumhod, invested chiefs and settled disputes, and they were allied with the holy families of the Ad Shaykh, 'Ad Mu'allim and 'Ad Darqi. The historian Jonathan Miran dates the period of Nā'ib dominance from the 1760s to the 1840s.

=== Islamization (1820s–1880s) ===
Most Tigre-speaking groups became Muslim within a few decades in the mid-19th century. Between the 1820s and the 1850s the Bet Asgede (the Habab, 'Ad Takles and 'Ad Temariam), the Mensa', the Marya, the Bet Juk and parts of the Bilen, who had until then followed various local forms of Christian practice, converted to Islam. Historians connect the speed of this change to Egyptian expansion into the Sudan, the revival of Red Sea and Nile valley trade, and raids on lowland pastoralists by highland chiefs. In this setting, Islam gave converts a new identity and a source of political legitimacy. By the 1880s every lowland group except the Kunama and part of the Bilen was Muslim.

The main agents of conversion were holy families, agents of the Nā'ibs, and the Khatimya in Eritrea Sufi order. Tigre- and Saho-speaking holy clans such as the Bayt Shaykh Mahmud, 'Ad Darqi, 'Ad Mu'allim, 'Ad Zubayr and al-Kabiri provided judges and teachers to the wider groups they served.

The Ad Shaykh claimed descent from a sharif from Mecca and rose to prominence through Shaykh al-Amin b. Hamid b. Naf'utay. His descendant Shaykh Muhammad b. 'Ali b. al-Amin (c. 1795–1877) settled at Emberemi around 1840, which the French traveller Guillaume Lejean called a "little Mecca". An annual pilgrimage to Emberemi is held on 13 Safar.

The Khatimya in Eritrea spread through the tours of its founder, Muhammad 'Uthman al-Mirghani, from about 1817 into the 1830s, which brought in followers among the Halanqa, Sabderat, Algeden, Beni-Amer, Barya and Marya. The order absorbed existing holy lineages into its network, and under Sayyid al-Hasan the ruling class of the Habab came under its influence. The two movements worked differently. The Ad Shaykh recruited heavily among the subordinate tigre (serf) families and so weakened the master–serf order, whereas the Khatimya in Eritrea left existing hierarchies intact. Among the Marya, different classes were converted by different orders.

=== Trade and economy ===
Steam navigation on the Red Sea from the late 1820s and 1830s revived the caravan route linking Kassala, Keren and Massawa. Pastoralists exchanged hides, butter, camels and cattle for imported cloth and other goods. Money spread inland from Massawa, and new markets drew formerly separate spheres of exchange into a single market economy. A clan of 'Ad Temariam and Habab cameleers carried goods between Massawa, Keren and the Barka, and Keren grew into a regional centre.

=== Imperial competition (1840s–1880s) ===
Egypt took Kassala in 1840 and gradually extended its control over Tigre-speaking areas, an expansion closely tied to the Khatimya in Eritrea. In 1854 the British consul Walter Plowden likened the lowland nomads to "flying-fish", preyed on from every side. Competition among Egypt, Ethiopia and European powers turned what had been porous frontiers into harder borders. In the 1870s and 1880s raids and tribute demands by Ras Alula put heavy pressure on lowland groups.

=== The Mahdiyya (1880s) ===
The rise of the Mahdist movement in the Sudan divided lowland Muslims. The Beni-Amer remained opposed to the Mahdists, while sections of the Habab and 'Ad Temariam supported the Mahdist commander 'Uthman Diqna, as did the dominant branches of the Ad Shaykh. According to Miran, the anti-Muslim policies of Emperor Yohannes IV pushed some lowlanders toward the Mahdists. The Battle of Kufit on 23 September 1885 ended Mahdist ambitions on the coast.

=== Italian colonial period (1885–1941) ===
In January 1895 almost the entire Habab population crossed into the Sudan in protest against heavy taxation; most returned a few weeks later. Governor Ferdinando Martini favoured the Khatimya in Eritrea, and in 1903 Sayyid Ja'far al-Mirghani settled in Keren. In the same year the colonial authorities divided the branches of the Ad Shaykh between separate districts, and their exemption from tribute was ended in 1904–05. By the 1920s the 'Ad Takles, most of the 'Ad Temariam and the Marya had transferred their allegiance from the Ad Shaykh and the Qadiriyya to the Khatimya in Eritrea, a shift Miran interprets as politically motivated. Many Tigre men served in the Italian colonial army.

=== British administration and the Muslim League (1941–1952) ===
Under British administration a movement for the emancipation of the tigre serf class grew among Tigre-speaking groups, with Ibrahim Sultan Ali as a leading figure. The movement fed into the founding of the Muslim League at Keren, which brought together lowland groups seeking emancipation and urban Muslim intellectuals. Miran dates the founding to December 1946, while other accounts place the founding meeting in January 1947. The Khatimya in Eritrea leadership gave only lukewarm support to serf emancipation and withdrew from the nationalist movement.

=== Federation, armed struggle and independence (1952–present) ===
During the federation with Ethiopia and after annexation, Muslim institutions in Eritrea were curtailed, and many lowlanders went into exile in the Sudan. According to Miran, the Eritrean Liberation Front drew its main early support from the Beni-Amer. Since independence in 1991 the government has promoted vernacular languages, including Tigre, alongside Arabic. Scholars have also noted restrictions on religious institutions after 2001.

== Social structure ==
Several Tigre-speaking societies, among them the Bet Asgede, were divided between a ruling stratum, the shemagalle, and a subordinate serf class known as tigre. In the 19th century the Ad Shaykh, who drew many of their followers from tigre families, weakened this order, and it came to an end with the emancipation movement of the 1940s. Miran notes that the effect of Islamization on relations between the shemagalle and the tigre remains little studied.

== Religion ==
Most Tigre are Sunni Muslims. One reference work puts the Muslim share at about 95%, with the remainder Christian. Among the people of Semhar and the eastern Tigre-speaking groups, the Hanafi school of law predominates, while the Maliki school prevails in the western lowlands.

Sufi orders, above all the Khatmiyya and the Qadiriyya, and hereditary holy clans such as the Ad Shaykh have played a central part in religious life (see Islamization above). Regional pilgrimages include the visit to Emberemi on 13 Safar and to the shrine of Sayyid Hashim al-Mirghani at Hitumlo on 2 Jumada al-Thani.

Christian minorities remain among parts of the Mensa' and the Bilen, which are religiously divided as a result of Catholic and Lutheran missionary work in the 19th century. The Swedish Evangelical Mission, active in the area from 1866, ran a school at Gheleb in Mensa' country.

== Language ==
The Tigre language belongs to the Ethiopian Semitic group of the Afroasiatic family, alongside Tigrinya and Ge'ez. It has developed in contact with Arabic, Beja, Saho and Tigrinya, and some Saho-speaking groups, such as the Bayt Shaykh Mahmud, adopted Tigre. The language contains many Arabic loanwords.

In 1952 the British official G. K. N. Trevaskis estimated that Tigre speakers made up 31.9% of Eritrea's population. Tigre is the lingua franca of the multi-ethnic lowlands of western and northern Eritrea, including the northern coast.

Tigre has a written tradition going back to the late 19th century. The Swedish Evangelical Mission printed a Tigre New Testament and school textbooks at its press at Monkullo, near Massawa, and the orientalist Enno Littmann published collections of Tigre texts in 1910–1915. Because most speakers are Muslim, Tigre is also written in the Arabic alphabet, and speakers formerly used Arabic more widely as a lingua franca. The Eritrean government publishes documents in Tigre using the Ge'ez script.

The Tigre people, language and homeland should not be confused with the Tigrayans of northern Ethiopia or the Biher-Tigrinya of the central Eritrean highlands, both of whom speak dialects of Tigrinya, a closely related Semitic language.

=== Dialects ===
Tigre dialects include Mansa' (Mensa), Habab, Barka, Semhar, Algeden, Senhit (Ad-Tekleis, Ad-Temariam, Bet-Juk, Marya Kayah, Maria Tselam) and Dahalik, which is spoken in the Dahlak Archipelago. Intelligibility between the dialects is above 91%, except for Dahalik, whose intelligibility with the other dialects is between 24% and 51%.

== Notable Tigre people ==
- Ibrahim Sultan
- Hamid Idris Awate
