= Ad Shaykh =

Muslim holy family and tribal group in Eritrea

The 'Ad Shaykh (Tigre: ዐድ ሼኽ; Arabic: عد شيخ), also spelled Ad Sheikh, are a Muslim holy family of Eritrea that grew into a large and wealthy Tigre-speaking tribal group. In the first half of the 19th century they were among the most important agents in the conversion of the Tigre-speaking societies of the Eritrean lowlands to Islam. Their influence declined after the Khatmiyya Sufi order, backed by the Italian colonial government, displaced them in the early 20th century.

== Origins ==
The family traces its descent to a sharif named Husayn from Mecca. Like many holy clans of the region, the 'Ad Shaykh based their religious standing on claims of descent from the Prophet and on the possession of baraka, a spiritual power believed to be inherited. They first gained wide influence in the Sahel region of northern Eritrea in the early 19th century, mainly through the preaching and reputed miracles of Shaykh al-Amin b. Hamid b. Naf'utay.

== Expansion and conversions ==
Between the 1820s and the 1850s, the 'Ad Shaykh and agents of the Nayebs of Hirgigo converted to Islam the Bet Asgede (the Habab, 'Ad Takles and 'Ad Temariam), the Mensa', the Marya, the Bet Juk and parts of the Bilen, who had previously followed local forms of Christianity. The family worked closely with the Nayebs, to whom many of these groups paid tribute. They also drew followers into the Qadiriyya Sufi order, chiefly among the Marya and Mensa', although little is known about this aspect of their activity.

The Ad Shaykh attracted whole families from the subordinate tigre class, the serf-like stratum of Tigre-speaking pastoral societies. Conversion and intermarriage with the holy family weakened the dependence of these families on their aristocratic masters; among the Bet Asgede, the aristocracy itself followed after Shaykh al-Amin married the daughter of their kantibay (chief). Miran describes this as a form of social revolution that challenged traditional chiefs, including those of the Beni-Amer. The new adherents were absorbed into the family, which grew into an influential and wealthy independent group.

The family later divided and spread across the western, northern and eastern lowlands of Eritrea. Some branches settled in the Anseba and Barka valleys, others remained in the Sahel, and others moved north as far as Tokar in Sudan. (Note: Miran (2005) associates the dispersal with the sons of Shaykh al-Amin b. Hamid b. Naf'utay, while Miran (2010) suggests the split may have taken place in the 18th century.) Two of Shaykh al-Amin's sons settled among the Garabit and the Faydab under the patronage of the Beni-Amer.

== Emberemi branch ==
Shaykh Muhammad b. 'Ali b. al-Amin (c. 1795 – 27 February 1877), (Note: Other sources give his birth year as 1808.) a grandson of Shaykh al-Amin, lived for twelve years at Hirgigo before settling around 1840 at Emberemi, a village a few kilometres from Massawa, where he founded the Semhar branch of the family. He was one of the most influential religious figures of the coast and its hinterland from the 1840s until his death, converted many people, especially among the Habab, and attracted large numbers of pilgrims. The French traveller Guillaume Lejean called Emberemi a "little Mecca". An annual pilgrimage (ziyara) to his tomb at Emberemi, held on 13 Safar, drew worshippers from across the Tigre- and Saho-speaking lowlands.

== Rivalry with the Khatmiyya ==
The 'Ad Shaykh and the Khatmiyya spread Islam in contrasting ways. The 'Ad Shaykh drew converts out of existing social hierarchies and into their own following, while the Khatmiyya incorporated local religious leaders into a wider network and left existing social and political structures in place. After Egypt took over Massawa in 1865, the balance between the two shifted gradually in favour of the Khatmiyya.

During the Mahdist uprising of the 1880s, leading members of the 'Ad Shaykh supported the Mahdists and the envoys of 'Uthman Diqna, and may have helped rally Tigre-speaking groups to the Mahdist cause. The Khatmiyya, by contrast, was allied with the Egyptians. A 1928 Italian report stated that the 'Ad Shaykh had secretly allied with the Mahdists through a Shaykh Hajj Ya'qub Muhammad 'Ali, who held a senior position in 'Uthman Diqna's forces.

== Italian colonial period ==
Italian officials regarded the 'Ad Shaykh as Mahdist sympathisers and as a destabilising influence among the lowland Muslims. Governor Ferdinando Martini (in office 1897–1907) sought to replace their influence with that of the Khatmiyya, whose leader he persuaded to settle in Keren in 1903. Martini's administration placed the family's Barka branch and its Sahel and Semhar branches under separate administrative districts (commissariati) in 1903, grouped the scattered sections in the Sahel and Anseba under a single chief, and ended the family's traditional exemption from tribute in 1904–1905.

These measures, together with the Khatmiyya's establishment at Keren, hastened the family's decline. By the 1920s the 'Ad Shaykh had little authority outside the Habab, and even there the Khatmiyya was gaining ground. The 'Ad Takles had joined the Khatmiyya, most of the 'Ad Temariam were under its influence, and the Marya had also switched from the 'Ad Shaykh and the Qadiriyya to the Khatmiyya.

== Historiography ==
Italian colonial writing about the 'Ad Shaykh was consistently hostile, describing their influence in terms such as "subversion" and "plundering". Miran notes that the handbook of the colonial official Alberto Pollera (1935) repeats arguments and a tone typical of officials at the beginning of the century, so these sources should be read with caution.

== See also ==
- Tigre people
- Islam in Eritrea
- Khatmiyya in Eritrea
- Nayeb dynasty of Hergigo
