= Mensah =

Mensah may refer to:

- Mensah (surname), a Ghanaian surname
- DJ Mensah, Ghanaian DJ

== See also ==
- Asante-Mensah
- Azumah-Mensah
- Mensa (disambiguation)
- Mensah-Bonsu
- Mensah-Coker
- Nunoo-Mensah
- Tachie-Mensah
- Takyi-Mensah
