= Marya =

Tigre-speaking ethnic group of Eritrea

The Marya (Tigre: ማርያ; Arabic: ماريا) are a Tigre-speaking people of western Eritrea. They are mostly herders and farmers and live in the middle valley of the Anseba River in the Keren District. They are divided into two clans, the Marya Qeyih and the Marya Tselam. The Marya are related to the Mensa, the Hazo and the Tora, and form a subgroup of the Tigre people.

== History ==
=== Conversion to Islam ===
Like other Tigre-speaking groups such as the Bet Asgede, the Mensa' and the Bet Juk, the Marya followed local forms of Christianity before converting to Islam between the 1820s and the 1850s. Their conversion did not follow a single path. The subordinate tigre class was converted by the Ad Shaykh holy family, and some of them later joined it. Part of the Marya aristocracy was converted by shaykhs of the Khatmiyya Sufi order, and another part later by the Ad Shaykh. The founder of the Khatmiyya, Muhammad 'Uthman al-Mirghani, had initiated followers among the Marya during his tours of the region in the early 19th century, and the 'Ad Shaykh drew Marya followers into the Qadiriyya order.

=== Contacts with the coast ===
After Egyptian troops burned Hirgigo, the seat of the Nayebs, in 1847, about 80 Balaw from Hirgigo settled among the Marya. Many of these families returned to Hirgigo after the Italian occupation of Massawa in 1885.

=== Italian colonial period ===
By the 1920s the Marya had moved their religious allegiance from the 'Ad Shaykh and the Qadiriyya to the Khatmiyya, which the Italian colonial authorities supported. Miran suggests that this change was partly political, since the Ad Shaykh were regarded as pro-Mahdist and the Khatmiyya cooperated with the Italian government.
