= Ibrahim Afa =

Eritrean guerrilla commander (died 1985)

- ኢብራሂም ዓፋ / إبراهيم عافة
- Born: 1940; Hergigo
- Died: 1985 (aged 44–45); Near Mount Agamet, northeastern Sahel, Eritrea
- Other names: Ibrahim Affa, Ibrahim Aafa, Wedi Afa
- Military career
- Allegiance: (Ethiopia) Ethiopian Empire (until 1967); Eritrean Liberation Front (1967–c. 1970); Eritrean People's Liberation Front (c. 1970–1985)
- Branch: Ethiopian Navy; Eritrean People's Liberation Army
- Service years: –1985
- Commands: 5th Battalion, EPLF southern front Secretary of the EPLF Military Committee
- Conflicts: Eritrean War of Independence; Capture of Keren (1977); Ethiopian offensives of 1978–1985

Ibrahim Afa (also spelled Affa or Aafa; Tigrinya: ኢብራሂም ዓፋ; died 1985) was an Eritrean guerrilla commander during the Eritrean War of Independence. A former member of the Ethiopian Navy, he joined the Eritrean Liberation Front (ELF) in 1967 and later became one of the founders and senior military leaders of the Eritrean People's Liberation Front (EPLF). From 1977 he sat on the EPLF's politburo, where he headed the organisation's Military Committee. He was killed in 1985 near Mount Agamet in northern Eritrea; the EPLF did not announce his death until its Second Congress in 1987, and the circumstances of his death have remained a matter of dispute.

== Early life and naval service ==
Afa was born in Hergigo and served in the Ethiopian Navy at Massawa, where he was reported to have been a cadet. In 1967 he left the navy and joined the ELF.

== Eritrean Liberation Front ==
In 1968 Afa was one of about ten ELF fighters sent to Cuba for military training, at a time when other ELF members, including Isaias Afwerki, were being trained in China. Accounts of the EPLF's history describe him as a skilled former marine commando.

== Eritrean People's Liberation Front ==
In the early 1970s Afa was part of the dissident groups that broke away from the ELF and eventually formed the EPLF. He belonged to the faction known as the first wing of the Popular Liberation Forces. In April 1971 he was among the small group of militants, including Isaias Afwerki, Mesfin Hagos, Ali Said Abdella and Mahmoud Ahmed Sherifo, who founded a clandestine political party inside the movement, later known as the Eritrean People's Revolutionary Party.

Before the EPLF's First Congress, Afa commanded the 5th Battalion on the front's southern front. At the First Organisational Congress in January 1977 he was elected to the EPLF politburo and named head of military affairs, serving on its standing committee alongside Romodan Mohammed Nur (secretary-general), Isaias Afwerki (deputy secretary-general) and Haile Woldetensae (political affairs).

Afa is credited with a leading role in the EPLF's 1977 offensive, during which the front took a series of towns including Nakfa, Afabet, Dekemhare and Keren; the capture of Keren in July 1977 is the operation most often associated with his name. He also represented the EPLF on the Joint Supreme Political Leadership set up with the ELF in the late 1970s to coordinate the two fronts. After the Ethiopian counteroffensive of 1978 and the EPLF's strategic withdrawal, he was based in the Arag area of northern Sahel and was associated with the front's defence of its base area through the early 1980s and with operations against the Ethiopian Northern Command on the northeastern coastal plain in 1984.

Some former fighters and later writers have described tension between Afa and Isaias Afwerki over military strategy, unity with the ELF, and the role of the Military Committee; the historian David Pool characterised the relationship as a power struggle.

== Death ==
Afa was killed in 1985 near Mount Agamet in northeastern Sahel, during the period of the Ethiopian Bahri Negash (Red Sea) offensive. The EPLF's official account, announced at the front's Second Congress in 1987, was that he was killed in action by a small Ethiopian unit. The two-year delay in announcing his death, together with inconsistencies in accounts of the incident, has led some exiled former fighters and opposition writers to allege that he was killed on the orders of rivals within the EPLF leadership; these claims have not been independently verified, and Pool describes the death as controversial.

After his death the Military Committee he had led lost its importance, and it was abolished at the 1987 congress in favour of a general staff under the secretary-general.

== Legacy ==
Afa is officially honoured as a martyr in Eritrea. A military training centre at Sawa bears his name. The Eritrean scholar Bereket Habte Selassie wrote a poem dedicated to his widow, Nura Mohamed, and their daughter, Sara.

== See also ==
- Eritrean War of Independence
- Eritrean People's Liberation Front
- Eritrean Liberation Front
