= Osman Saleh Sabbe =

Eritrean revolutionary and nationalist (1932–1987)

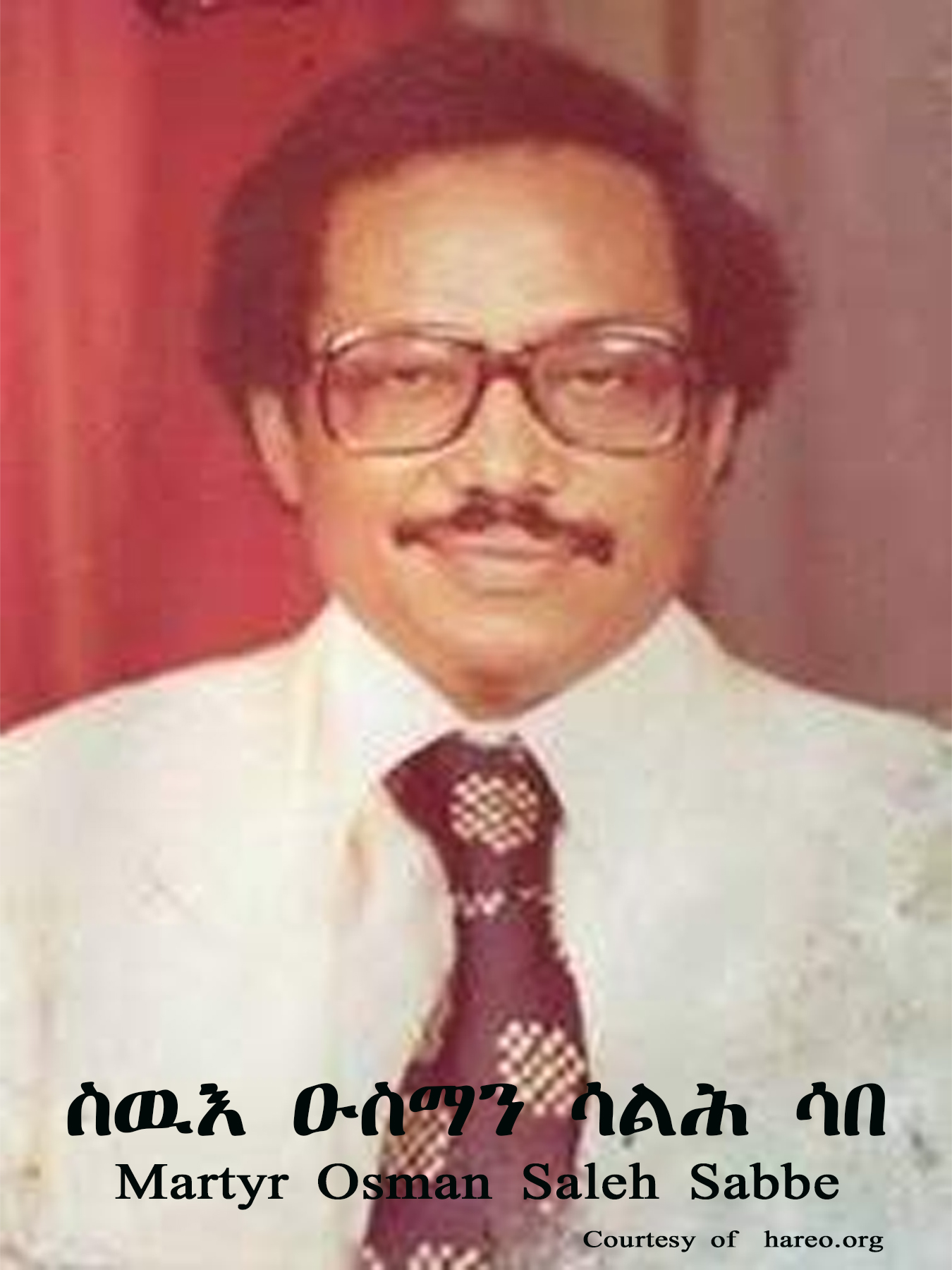
- Born: 1932; Hirgigo, Italian Eritrea
- Died: April 4, 1987 (aged 54–55); Cairo, Egypt
- Children: 6

Osman Saleh Sabbe (1932 – 4 April 1987) was an Eritrean revolutionary and nationalist leader who played a prominent role in the Eritrean War of Independence. After joining the Eritrean Liberation Front (ELF) in 1961, he became one of its leading ideologues and was placed in charge of its foreign relations. Historian Jonathan Miran describes Sabbe as the principal activist promoting the Eritrean liberation struggle within a pan-Arabist framework, through which he established relations and secured support from governments and organizations throughout the Arab world. Sabbe frequently presented the Eritrean revolution as a “Muslim-Arab cause”.

== Early life ==
Born in 1932 in a village of Hirgigo in the suburb of Massawa, he was fifth of eight siblings. After attending local Islamic school, he joined Hirgigo primary school which was founded by Pasha Saleh Ahmed Kekia in 1944. After finishing elementary and middle school he traveled to Addis Ababa, Ethiopia to complete his secondary school and attend teacher training college.

After graduating from teacher training college, he returned to Hirgigo and worked as a teacher and later a principal of the school. In 1956 he took the General Certificate of Education Exam of the University of London and pursued his education with distance learning and he obtained a bachelor's degree in history and political science. Osman understood the importance of education and the lack of proper education institutes in Eritrea and especially in the lowlands of Eritrea, therefore he used to encourage and send his students to Sudan and Egypt in pursuit of further education.

Osman had six children, including two sons and four daughters. His brother, Mahmoud Saleh Sabbe, was one of the ELF prisoners who was freed from Adi Quala prison during an ELF operation in February 1975.

== Exile ==
In the late 1940s and early 1950s during his time in Addis Ababa, Eritrean politics was at a crossroads because of the burgeoning Eritrean nationalist movement. Like many Eritrean patriots, Osman had a strong stand on the need for Eritrean independence. His activities were put under surveillance by the Ethiopian authorities and, in 1960, he was later forced into exile in Aden, Yemen.

Revolutionary leaders such as Romodan Mohammed Nur, Alamin Mohammed Said and Ibrahim Affa that made great contribution towards the struggle of Eritrean Independence were some of his students from Hirghigo School.

Osman Saleh Sabbe died of a sudden illness in 1987 in a hospital in Cairo, Egypt.

== Political life ==
Osman dedicated his life to the struggle of Eritrean independence and became the backbone of Eritrean revolution during the dark and desperate years. After his exile, Osman focused his activity in bringing fellow Eritreans in exile into strengthening the fight for independence. During this time Osman had participated in the Eritrean Liberation Front (ELF) leadership and was appointed as head of foreign affairs. He succeeded in raising awareness of the Eritrean struggle for independence across the Middle East and Africa in countries such as Yemen, Somalia, Saudi Arabia, Egypt, and Syria.

== Achievements ==
Some of Osman's achievements were

1. Creating awareness and sympathy to Eritreans and Eritrean cause across the world
2. Proving full military logistic supply to Eritrean Liberation Army from friendly countries across the world
3. Enabling Somalian government to issue Somali diplomatic passport to Eritrean revolutionary leaders
4. Enabling Eritrean refugees in the Mideast and North Africa to get residence permit
5. Enabling Eritrean refugees access to free school education in Mideast and North Africa
6. Enabling Eritrean or convert refugees access to free higher education scholarship Mideast and North Africa
7. Authoring Eritrean History and related books and publications

== Books ==
- Sabbe, Osman Saleh (1978). The roots of the Eritrean disagreements and how to solve them.
- Sabby, Othman Saleh (1970). The history of Eritrea. Translated by al-Azem, Muhamad Fawaz. Beirut: Dar al-Masirah.
- Speech of the Foreign Mission Delivered by Osman Saleh Sabbe, the Official Spokesman
- Objective Account on the Ethiopian Attitude Towards Eritrea: In the Light of Historical, Geographical and Political Realities
