= Khatmiyya in Eritrea =

Sufi order in Eritrea

The Khatmiyya (Arabic: الختمية; Tigre: ኸትሚያ) is the largest and most influential Sufi order in Eritrea. It spread into the region in the early 19th century and became closely tied to the Egyptian and later the Italian colonial administrations, before losing much of its influence in the second half of the 20th century.

== Spread in the 19th century ==
The founder of the order, Muhammad 'Uthman al-Mirghani, made three missionary tours that reached the Eritrean region between about 1817 and the 1830s. In western Eritrea he initiated followers among the Halanqa, Sabderat, Algeden, Beni-Amer, Barya and Marya, and in the Sahel and Semhar he appointed local representatives (khalifas and khalifat al-khulafa'). The order expanded by attaching existing local religious figures and holy lineages to its network, a method that allowed communities to keep their existing social and political structures. This contrasted with the methods of its main local rival, the Ad Shaykh holy family.

The order's growth in the region accompanied the Egyptian conquest of Sudan from 1820, and it kept good relations with the Egyptian administration, especially after Egypt took Kassala in 1840. After the founder's death in 1852, his son Muhammad al-Hasan al-Mirghani (1819–1869), who had established the order's headquarters at al-Saniyya near Kassala around 1840, led its northern and eastern Sudanese branch, and under him the ruling class of the Habab came under greater Khatmiyya influence. In the 1860s and 1870s Muhammad 'Uthman Taj al-Sirr al-Mirghani (1849/50–1903) lived among the Habab and later among Saho-speaking groups, and did more than any other family member to consolidate the order in the Sahel, Semhar and Akele Guzai. After Egypt took over Massawa in 1865, the order gradually overtook the 'Ad Shaykh in the region, and at least eight mosques in and around Massawa came to be associated with it.

== Mahdist period and Italian rule ==
The Khatmiyya opposed the Mahdist movement of the 1880s, while leading elements of the 'Ad Shaykh supported it. Contrary to an earlier view that Sayyid Hashim al-Mirghani established the order at Massawa in 1860, Italian archival sources indicate that he settled there permanently only in April 1885, after fleeing Kassala during the Mahdist uprising. The Italian authorities paid him a monthly stipend in exchange for his influence over the lowland Muslims and for intelligence on the Mahdists and the Ethiopians, but relations were often strained.

Governor Ferdinando Martini (1897–1907) set out to make the Khatmiyya the official representative of Eritrea's Muslims and to counter both the influence of Kassala, across the border, and that of the 'Ad Shaykh. After Sayyid Hashim's death in 1901, a plan to move his remains to Keren was dropped in the face of opposition in Massawa, and the government instead paid for his tomb at Hitumlo and for a mosque in Keren. In 1903 Sayyid Ja'far b. Bakri al-Mirghani (1871–1943) moved from Kassala to Keren as the order's official leader in the colony. Hashim's daughter, Sharifa 'Alawiya, who settled in Keren in the same year, disputed Ja'far's authority to appoint deputies in the Massawa area, and the rivalry divided the order's followers in Keren, Massawa and Asmara. By the 1920s many Tigre-speaking groups, including the 'Ad Takles, the 'Ad Temariam and the Marya, had moved from the 'Ad Shaykh and the Qadiriyya to the Khatmiyya. An annual pilgrimage to Sayyid Hashim's shrine at Hitumlo, held on 2 Jumada II, became one of the most important religious gatherings in the region.

== British administration and later ==
Under the British Military Administration (1941–1952), the order struggled to move from its role as an Italian-backed authority to a place in Eritrean nationalist politics. Its leaders' limited support for the emancipation of the tigre serf class among Tigre-speaking groups, and their eventual withdrawal from the nationalist movement, marked a decline in its influence. Sayyid Abu Bakr al-Mirghani, the order's khalifa in Keren, served as honorary president of the Muslim League founded in 1946. The order lost much of its remaining influence during the war of independence, and its leaders withdrew to Kassala in 1975.

== See also ==
- Khatmiyya
- Ad Shaykh
- Bet Asgede
- Islam in Eritrea
