= Romodan Osman Awliya =

Eritrean military officer and administrator

- Born: Hirgigo, Eritrea
- Other names: Ramadan Osman Awliya; Romedan Osman Aweliay; Romodan Osman Awelyay
- Military career
- Allegiance: Eritrea
- Branch: Eritrean Defence Forces
- Rank: Major general
- Commands: Central Command, Eritrean Defence Forces; Eritrean Defence Forces Training Center
- Other work: Commissioner of Sports; Governor of the Central Region

Romodan Osman Awliya (also spelled Ramadan Osman Awliya, Romedan Osman Aweliay or Romodan Osman Awelyay) is an Eritrean military officer with the rank of major general in the Eritrean Defence Forces (EDF). He has served as Commissioner of Sports, as Governor (administrator) of the Central Region, and as Commander of the EDF's Central Command. As of September 2026, he was Commander of the Eritrean Defence Forces Training Center.

== Early life ==
Awliya was born in Hirgigo, a town near Massawa in what is now the Northern Red Sea Region of Eritrea.

== Career ==
=== Commissioner of sports ===
Awliya succeeded Alamin Siraj, a veteran of the armed struggle, as head of Eritrea's sports commission. He was later succeeded in the post by former ambassador to Italy Zemede Tekle Woldetatios, who was reported as Commissioner of Sports in 2015.

=== Governor of the Central Region ===
After leaving the sports commission, Awliya became administrator of the Central Region (Zoba Maekel), which includes the capital, Asmara. Eritrean state media referred to him as Governor of the Central Region in October 2018, when he attended a workshop on strengthening community magistrates, and in June 2019, when he attended a Martyrs' Day cultural event in the region.

=== Central Command and military delegations ===
By July 2020, Awliya was Commander of the EDF's Central Command. In that capacity he was part of a high-level EDF delegation led by Chief of Staff General Filipos Woldeyohannes that visited Sudan on 20–21 July 2020, delivering a message from President Isaias Afwerki to Abdel Fattah al-Burhan, chairman of the Transitional Sovereignty Council. The delegation also held talks with Mohamed Hamdan Dagalo and Sudanese military leaders on defence and security cooperation.

In April 2023, he was a member of a senior Eritrean military delegation, led by Brigadier General Abraha Kasa, head of Eritrea's National Security Agency, that made an official visit to Ethiopia at the invitation of the Ethiopian National Defense Force. The delegation visited Asosa and the Grand Ethiopian Renaissance Dam in the Benishangul-Gumuz Region.

=== EDF Training Center ===
On 26 September 2026, as Commander of the Eritrean Defence Forces Training Center, Awliya inaugurated a new dam in the Adi-Hawosha administrative area of the Gala-Nefhi sub-zone of the Central Region. The dam was built jointly by residents, the government and an EDF unit, at a reported cost of about 11 million nakfa, with a storage capacity of 180,000 cubic metres.
