= Bet Asgede =

Tigre-speaking confederation in Eritrea

The Bet Asgede (Tigre: ቤት ኣስገዴ; Arabic: بيت أسقدي), also spelled Bayt Asgade or Bet Asgäde, are a confederation of Tigre-speaking groups in northern Eritrea, made up of three branches: the Habab, the 'Ad Takles (also 'Ad Tekles) and the 'Ad Temariam (also 'Ad Tamaryam). They are traditionally associated with the Sahel region of northern Eritrea. Historically they were pastoralists, and their society was divided between a ruling aristocracy and a subordinate tigre class.

== Origins ==
According to their traditions, the Bet Asgede migrated to the Sahel from Akkele Guzay in the Eritrean highlands, perhaps in the 16th century, when the region was devastated by the religious wars of that period (see Ethiopian–Adal war). Miran cites them as an example of groups whose very formation was linked to migration into the contested borderland between the Ethiopian state and the Funj Sultanate.

== Relations with the Nayebs ==
The Habab were among the largest and wealthiest groups under the authority of the Nayebs of Hirgigo, and their submission made tribute a more important source of Nayeb revenue. The Nayebs confirmed the Habab chief, the kantibay; on one occasion a newly elected kantibay gave the Nayeb 100 camels, 100 cows, 100 goats and 100 woollen blankets in return for confirmation. After the Ottomans reasserted control over the coast in 1849, the old flexible arrangements were replaced in the early 1850s by fixed annual cash payments. The Habab were assessed at 3,000 thalers, and the 'Ad Takles and 'Ad Temariam at 1,000 each. In June 1850 a combined force of Ottoman soldiers and Nayeb militia met stiff resistance in Habab territory.

== Conversion to Islam ==
The Bet Asgede had followed local forms of Christianity before converting to Islam between the 1820s and the 1850s. The main agents of the change were the Ad Shaykh holy family and agents of the Nayebs. The preaching of the 'Ad Shaykh leader Shaykh al-Amin b. Hamid b. Naf'utay first attracted the subordinate tigre class, whose conversion and intermarriage with the holy family undermined their dependence on the Bet Asgede aristocracy. The aristocracy followed after al-Amin married the daughter of their kantibay. His grandson Shaykh Muhammad b. 'Ali b. al-Amin (d. 1877), based at Emberemi near Massawa, converted many Habab. The 'Ad Mu'allim holy clan served especially among the 'Ad Temariam, and the 'Ad Darqi among the Habab. Miran notes that how these nominally Christian communities converted remains an open question for research.

The Khatmiyya Sufi order also gained ground. Under Sayyid al-Hasan al-Mirghani (1819–1869), the ruling class of the Habab came increasingly under Khatmiyya influence, and in the 1860s Muhammad 'Uthman Taj al-Sirr al-Mirghani (1849/50–1903) lived among the Habab.

== Trade ==
During the 19th-century expansion of trade through Massawa, a clan of the 'Ad Temariam and Habab camel drivers provided transport between Massawa, Keren and the Barka region.

== Mahdist period ==
During the Mahdist uprising of the 1880s, sections of the Habab and the 'Ad Temariam supported the Mahdist cause and cooperated with the envoys of the Mahdist commander 'Uthman Diqna, possibly under the influence of the 'Ad Shaykh. According to a British report, the principal chief of the Habab, Shaykh 'Umar b. Muhammad, claimed to have joined the Mahdist holy war.

== Italian colonial period ==
In January 1895 almost the entire Habab population left north-western Eritrea and crossed into Anglo-Egyptian Sudan, in protest against Italian rule and to escape the heavy taxes imposed by the colonial government. Most returned to Eritrea after several weeks. The episode, known as the "Habab defection", has been studied in detail by Marco Lenci.

Under Italian rule the Bet Asgede gradually changed their religious affiliation. By the 1920s the 'Ad Takles had all been initiated into the Khatmiyya, and the 'Ad Temariam were more under Khatmiyya influence than that of the 'Ad Shaykh. The 'Ad Shaykh kept some authority mainly among the Habab, but even there the Khatmiyya was spreading. Miran suggests that the switch from the 'Ad Shaykh, regarded as pro-Mahdist, to the Khatmiyya, which cooperated with the Italian authorities, was partly politically motivated.

== See also ==
- Tigre people
- Ad Shaykh
- Nayeb dynasty of Hergigo
