= Balaw =

Arab ethnic group in Eritrea and Sudan

Regions with significant populations
- Sudan and Eritrea

Languages
- Arabic

Religion
- Sunni Islam

Related ethnic groups
- Arabs and Beja

Balaw (also spelled Belew or Bellou) are an Arab group consisting of Arab Bedouin and Beja components, historically associated with eastern Sudan and the western, southern and coastal lowlands of Eritrea.

They are described as an ancient “Beja-ized Arab group”, reflecting their Arab origins and their subsequent interaction and intermarriage with neighbouring Beja populations.

Although some Balaw groups followed nomadic and pastoral ways of life, others formed an urban, commercial and political elite centred on Arkiko and Massawa. The Balaw played an important role in the history of the Eritrean lowlands and formerly constituted a ruling stratum among the Beni Amer. From the 16th century onward, members of a Balaw family held the hereditary office of na'ib in the region surrounding Massawa.

The Balaw na'ibs acted as intermediaries between the Red Sea coast, the Ottoman Empire, local pastoral communities and the rulers of the Eritrean and Ethiopian highlands. Balaw families also contributed to the spread and consolidation of Islam in Eritrea.

== Name ==
The ethnonym appears in a number of forms, including Balaw, Balau, Belu, Bellou, Bellow, Belliyun and Bellawiyun. The linguist Leo Reinisch recorded the Beja term beláawi as a designation for an Arab, while beláawye could refer to Arabic customs or the Arabic language, in contrast to Beja customs and language. Didier Morin likewise notes that the Beja word baláwi could mean “an Arab”. He also records Sudanese traditions according to which the Balaw emerged following an influx of Arab groups, including the Balli or Billi, who were said to have originated in the Hejaz. The anthropologists C. G. Seligman and Brenda Z. Seligman similarly reported that the Hadendoa used Belawi to denote an Arab and called the Arabic language Belawye, distinguishing both from Beja identity and the Beja language.

== History ==
=== Origins and migration ===
The Balaw are traditionally associated with the region around Suakin in eastern Sudan. They are generally described as having emerged through the interaction and intermarriage of Beja populations with Arab and Bedouin migrants along the western coast of the Red Sea.

During a later wave of Beja migration into Eritrea, groups identified as Balaw or Belew entered the territories of present-day Eritrea between approximately the 12th and 15th centuries.

Some Balaw groups continued southward along the coast toward Zeila, where they became involved in local political and social structures and attained positions of political prominence.

=== Political role ===
The Balaw became an influential population in the western and coastal lowlands of Eritrea. They were formerly the ruling class of the Beni Amer, before their authority was replaced by a ruling family of Ja'alin origin from eastern Sudan.

Balaw communities were dispersed across Eritrea and became incorporated into a number of neighbouring tribes and local populations. Their principal political centre eventually developed at Arkiko, on the mainland opposite Massawa.

From the 16th century onward, the Balaw family of Arkiko exercised authority over the surrounding Semhar region. Following the establishment of the Habesh Eyalet, the Ottoman authorities recognised the family's local influence and appointed its chief as na'ib, or deputy, of the territory surrounding Massawa.

The Balaw na'ibs acted as intermediaries between the Ottoman administration, the inhabitants of Massawa, the pastoral peoples of the lowlands and the rulers of the highlands. Their representatives travelled throughout the region collecting tribute and commercial dues, while the family maintained influence over the trade routes linking Massawa with the Eritrean interior.

During the period of Egyptian rule, a member of the na'ib family was appointed sirdar, or commander, of the troops stationed at Massawa. Although the family's political autonomy declined under more direct Egyptian and later colonial administration, it continued to retain local prestige and influence.

=== Role in the spread of Islam ===
The Balaw of Semhar contributed to the spread and consolidation of Islam in Eritrea. Their control of routes between Massawa and the highlands allowed them to support Muslim scholars, religious families and centres of Islamic learning.

Balaw families were granted land in the highlands by the ras of Tigray. Some of these estates subsequently became centres of Islamic teaching and religious activity. Through their political agents, trade connections and religious patronage, the Balaw helped strengthen links between Muslim communities of the Red Sea coast and those of the Eritrean interior.
