= Joseph Mensah =

Joseph Mensah may refer to:

- Joseph Mensah (footballer) (born 1994), Ghanaian footballer
- Joseph Mensah (police officer) Involved in the Shooting of Alvin Cole
- Joseph Mensah (politician) (born 1957), Ghanaian politician
- Joseph Henry Mensah (1928–2018), Ghanaian politician and economist

== See also ==
- Joe Mensah (died 2003), Ghanaian musician
