= Bernard Mensah =

Bernard Mensah may refer to:

- Bernard Mensah (footballer, born October 1994), Ghanaian football attacking midfielder for Kayserispor
- Bernard Mensah (footballer, born December 1994), English football striker for Gloucester City
