= Erica Ntiamoah Mensah =

Ghanaian medical doctor

Erica Maame Abena Pomaa Ntiamoah Mensah is a Ghanaian medical doctor in obstetrics and gynaecology resident who gained national recognition in 2021 as the youngest female medical doctor in Ghana at the age of 21. She is known for her advocacy for women's health and assisted reproductive technology.

== Early life and education ==
Dr. Erica was born to Dr. Eric Ntiamoah Mensah, a prominent women's health advocate and founder of the CPF Medical Unit. She began her early education at CPF Baby College in Achimota and further went to Mary Mother of Good Counsel School at West Airport, Accra. She completed her junior high school education at the Ridge Church School in Accra.

She attended Achimota School for her secondary education, a well known institution in Accra, before gaining admission to the Accra College of Medicine, a private medical school.

In 2021, at the age of 21, she graduated from medical school, making her the youngest female medical doctor in Ghana at that time. She was ushered into the medical profession with a congratulatory message from the eminent pediatric surgeon, Professor Afua Hesse.

== Career ==
After her graduation, Dr. Ntiamoah Mensah pursued to specialize in obstetrics and gynaecology. She is currently a resident at the Ghana College of Physicians and Surgeons.

== Women's Health Advocacy ==
Dr. Ntiamoah Mensah has expressed a strong interest in women's health and assisted reproductive technology, where she followed her father's footsteps, Dr. Eric Ntiamoah Mensah, who is widely known for his television program The Complete Woman, which focuses on women's healthcare and reproductive health issues.

In a 2021 interview with The Mirror, she stated: "Women suffer from myraid of peculiar ailments and need attention and care. It is my aim to build on the foundation which my father, who is also a medical doctor, has laid when it comes to Women's Health Advocacy."

== Family legacy ==
Dr. Erica Ntiamoah Mensah comes from a family of medical doctors. Her father, Dr. Eric Ntiamoah Mensah, is the founder of the CPF Medical Unit, a private healthcare organization in Achimota, Accra. Her younger brother, Dr. Pedro Ntiamoah Mensah, graduated from medical school at the age of 23, continuing the family's medical legacy. Together, the three form a notable family of Ghanaian doctors.
