= Gideon Mensah =

Gideon Mensah is the name of:

- Gideon Mensah (footballer, born 1998), Ghanaian footballer
- Gideon Mensah (footballer, born 2000), Ghanaian footballer
