= John Mensah (disambiguation) =

John Mensah (born 1982) is a Ghanaian footballer.

John Mensah is also the name of:

- John Attu Mensah (died 2021), father of John, Ghanaian footballer
- John Frederick Mensah, Ghanaian football administrator

== See also ==
- Jonathan Mensah (born 1990), Ghanaian footballer
- John Mensah Sarbah (1864–1910), lawyer and political leader in the Gold Coast (now Ghana)
