= Muzic Mensah =

Ghanaian highlife musician (born 1978)

- Born: Lawrence Mensah; 17 July 1978 (age 48); Accra, Ghana
- Occupation: Musician
- Years active: 2004–present
- Awards: Best Highlife Artiste of the Year, Ghana Music Awards USA (2024)

Lawrence Mensah (born 17 July 1978), known professionally as Muzic Mensah, is a Ghanaian highlife singer and songwriter. He won Best Highlife Artiste of the Year at the 2024 Ghana Music Awards USA, and has also been nominated at the Ghana Music Awards Europe. His songs include "Joohami", "Babe" (featuring Strongman), "Lady in Red", "Ankwanoma" (featuring Kwame Yogot), "Logo Ligi" and "All Correct". among others.

== Early life ==
Mensah was born on 17 July 1978 in Accra, Ghana, to Moses and Bernice Mensah. He finished his secondary education at the Modern College of Commerce in the 1990s.

== Career ==
Mensah began his career in 2004 as a gospel singer, recording and performing Christian worship songs. He later stepped away from music, and returned in 2021 as a highlife and Afrobeat artist with Triple M Records.

== Personal life ==
Mensah is married to Melissa Mensah.

== Discography ==
- "Joohami"
- "Babe" (featuring Strongman)
- "Ankwanoma" (featuring Kwame Yogot)
- "All Correct"
- "Lady in Red"
- "Logo Ligi"
- "Obi B3 Su" (featuring J Blak)
- "My Heart's Desire"

== Awards and nominations ==
In 2024, Mensah won Best Highlife Artiste of the Year at the Ghana Music Awards USA. He received four nominations at the 2026 Ghana Music Awards USA.

== Recognition ==
In 2026, Mensah was selected for Boomplay's first Next Wave programme, along with 17 other new artists from Africa.

== Philanthropy ==
In 2024, Mensah donated school uniforms, shoes, exercise books and other learning materials to pupils at Abutia Sebekofe D/A Primary School in the Volta Region.
