= Romodan Mohammed Nur =

Eritrean politician (1941–2021)

Leader of the Eritrean People's Liberation Front
- In office 1977–1987
- Preceded by: Position established
- Succeeded by: Isaias Afwerki

Personal details
- Born: 8 August 1938 Hargigo, Italian East Africa
- Died: 30 December 2021 (aged 83) Khartoum, Sudan
- Party: Eritrean People's Liberation Front

Romodan Mohammed Nur (Arabic: رمضان محمد نور); 8 August 1938 – 30 December 2021) was an Eritrean politician who was the first chairman of the Eritrean People's Liberation Front and a key figure during the Eritrean War of Independence.

== Early and personal life ==
Romodan was born in Hirghigo (now Arkiko in Eritrea's Northern Red Sea Region) in Italian East Africa in 1938. He came from a Tigre-speaking merchant family. He attended Kekiya School, and in 1957 went to Cairo to attend secondary school.

== Rebel fighter ==
In 1961 he joined the Eritrean Liberation Forces, and in 1963 Romodan went to receive military training in Syria. He rose to become political commissar of Zone 4 in 1965, and was one of the original group of five sent for training in China in 1967.

In 1970, Romodan was among the founders of the People's Liberation Forces (PLF) at Sudoha Ila, and in 1971 he was elected to lead the PLF, after which he developed close links to the Ala group led by his colleague, Isaias Afwerki. Together with Isaias and others, Romodan created the nucleus of what was to become the EPLF within the Eritrean Liberation Forces – People's Liberation Forces (ELF-PLF).

At the EPLF's First Congress in 1977, he was elected secretary general, a position he held until 1987. In 1987, he became vice secretary-general as Isaias Afwerki assumed public leadership.

== Later life ==
In 1994, Romodan suddenly resigned as vice secretary general of the EPLF. He then lived a quiet civilian life and died in Khartoum on December 30, 2021. He had six children.
