= Albert Kobina Mensah =

Albert Kobina Mensah is a Ghanaian environmental scientist, researcher and author. His academic work centers on soil pollution, mining-induced land degradation, phytoremediation, and environmental risk assessment. He is a Research Scientist at the Council for Scientific and Industrial Research – Soil Research Institute (CSIR-SRI) in Kumasi, and an Adjunct Lecturer at the University of Mines and Technology (UMaT), Tarkwa.

== Early life and education ==
Albert Kobina Mensah grew up in Prestea, a gold-mining town in Ghana's Western Region, where early exposure to environmental degradation from mining activities shaped his academic and professional trajectory. He attended Prestea Senior Secondary Technical School. He earned a Bachelor of Science in Agricultural Science from the University of Cape Coast. He then pursued a Master of Science in Water Resources and Watershed Management at Kenyatta University in Nairobi, Kenya, before his PhD in Natural Sciences at the Department of Soil Science and Soil Ecology at Ruhr University Bochum in Germany.

== Authorship ==
Albert Kobina Mensah has published about 50 peer-reviewed articles.

He is also the author of the books listed below.

1. Soil Pollution and Remediation: Risk Assessment, Phytoremediation, Revegetation — De Gruyter, 2025
2. Environmental Safety: Techniques for Identifying Soil-Human Health Risks in Mining Site Reclamation - 2024
3. Returning to Ghana — After a PhD — 2023
4. The Scholar's Journey: A Practical Guide to Entering Graduate School and Securing Master's and PhD Funding - 2022
5. I Speak of a Better Society — 2021.
