= Evans Mensah =

Evans Mensah may refer to:

- Evans Mensah (footballer, born 1988), Ghanaian former football striker
- Evans Mensah (footballer, born 1998), Ghanaian football winger for Helsingin Jalkapalloklubi and Ghana national football team
