= Mensa (name) =

Mensa may refer to the following people:

Given name

- Mensa Bonsu (c. 1840 – c. 1896), tenth king of the Kingdom of Ashanti in present-day Ghana
- Mensa Otabil (born 1959), Ghanaian theologian, philanthropist, motivational speaker and entrepreneur

Surname

- Josep Pascó i Mensa (1855–1910), Spanish painter, illustrator and designer
- Lucas Mensa (born 1996), Argentine rugby union player
- Vic Mensa (born 1993), American hip hop recording artist

== See also ==
- Winston Mensa-Wood, Ghanaian retired lieutenant general and former Chief of Defence Staff of the Ghana Armed Forces (1990–1992)
- Mensah (surname)
