= Mohammed Martin Mensah =

Ghanaian footballer

Mohammed Mensah
Personal information
- Full name: Mohammed Martin Mensah
- Date of birth: July 3, 1981 (age 45)
- Place of birth: Ghana
- Position: Midfielder

Senior career*
| Years | Team | Apps | (Gls) |
| 2006–2007 | Liberty Professionals | | |
| 2007–2008 | Zob Ahan | 12 | (0) |

International career
- Ghana U23
- * Club domestic league appearances and goals as of 28 June 2008

Mohammed Martin Mensah (born 3 July 1981) is a Ghanaian football midfielder who played for F.C. Zob Ahan in Iran's Premier Football League.

== Career ==
He previously played for Liberty Professionals FC.

== International ==
Mensah attracted interest from Iranian clubs following a friendly between the Ghana under-23 side and Iran played on June 28, 2007, in Tehran.
