= Nii Abbey Mensah =

Ghanaian businessman

Anthony Nii Abbey Mensah
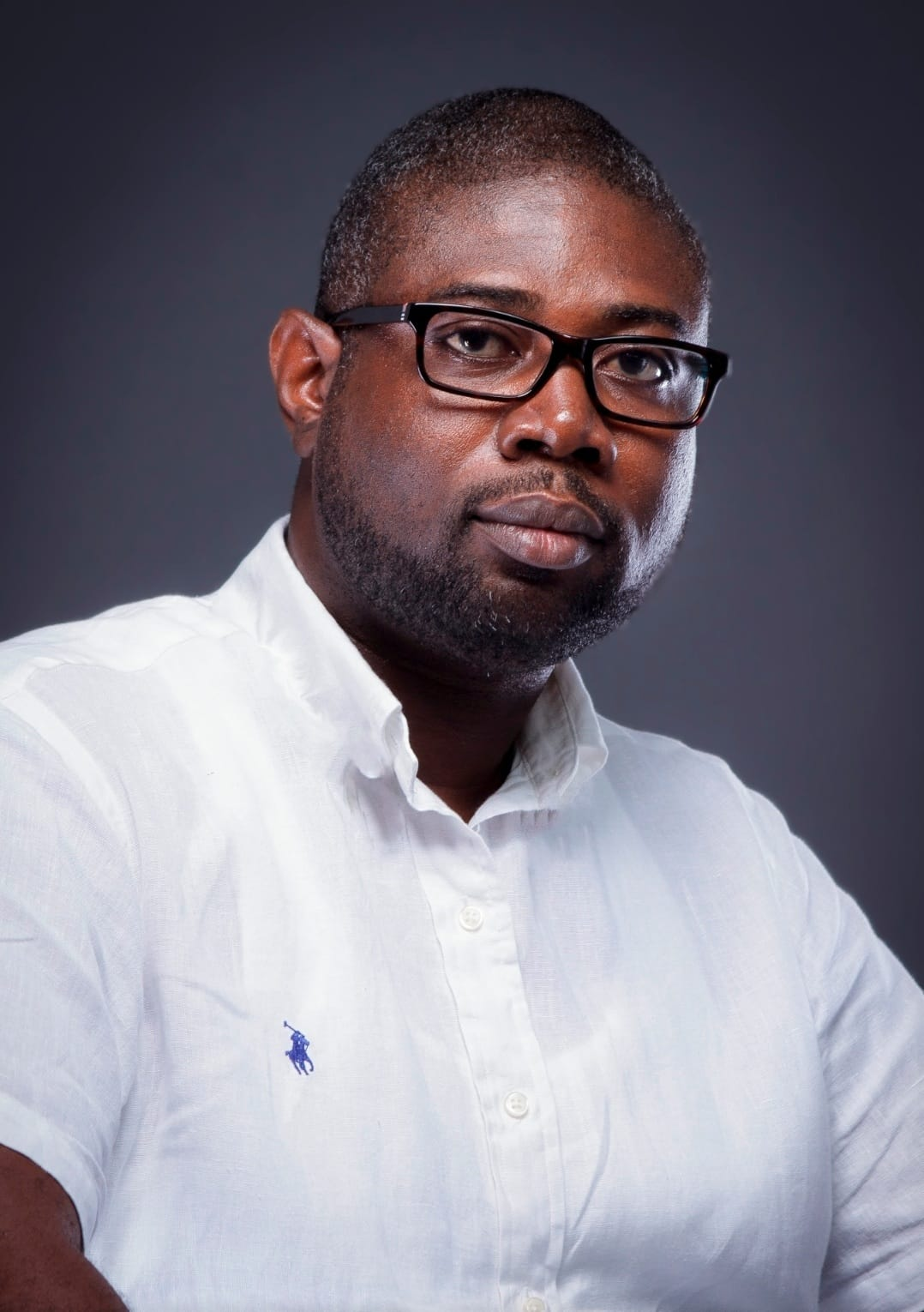
- Ghanaian media executive, entrepreneur, and digital publisher
- Born: 17 September 1973 (age 52); Accra, Greater Accra Region, Ghana
- Education: Labone Senior High School
- Alma mater: University of Ghana
- Occupation: Ghanaian media executive
- Organization(s): Ghana Music, Style Afrique, and MiPROMO
- Known for: www.ghanamusic.com

Anthony Nii Abbey Mensah (often professionally known as Nii Abbey Mensah) is a Ghanaian media executive, entrepreneur, and digital publisher born on September 17, 1973, in Accra, Ghana. He is the founder and chief executive officer of MiPROMO Limited, a digital music distribution and content monetization company. He is also the founder of Ghana Music, one of the continent's longest-running online platforms for Ghanaian music news and reviews, and the lifestyle platform Style Afrique.

Nii Abbey Mensah is recognized for his pioneering role in the digitization of the Ghanaian music industry, particularly in helping artists monetize content through YouTube and other digital streaming platforms. He has become a key figure in shaping the country's digital music ecosystem and mentoring entertainment bloggers and entertainment personalities like George Britton, AJ Sarpong, Nii Atakora Mensah, and many others.

== Early life and education ==
Nii Abbey grew up in Accra, where he developed an early interest in music, particularly hiplife. He attended Bolgatanga Secondary School in Bolgatanga, Adonten Secondary School, and later Labone Secondary School for both O’Level and A’Level, completing his studies in 1992. He proceeded to the University of Ghana and graduated with a BA Hons in Economics in 1997. While still a student, together with his friends, he began organising fanfairs, food fairs, and jams on campus under Mi Promotions, which he later registered as a limited liability company upon graduation. He also holds an MBA from the Business School, University of Ghana, which he obtained in 2001. For his project work, he successfully designed the first website for the School of Administration, honing the skills that would later underpin his first digital venture – the Ghana Music website.

== Career beginnings ==
After completing his first degree, Nii Abbey formalized Mi Promotions and incorporated it as MiPROMO Limited in 1998 with Kweku Akuamoah. MiPROMO formed a partnership with Guido Sohne of Webstar Internet and successfully created the first websites for the Ghana Civil Aviation Authority, the Ghana Trade Fair Authority, the Media Commission, and the Divestiture Implementation Committee, amongst others.

Nii Abbey identified the lack of info on the Ghanaian music scene online, especially at the time hiplife had gained popularity. He started the Ghana Music website initially as a hobby, but later formalized it under MiPROMO.

Ghana Music: Nii Abbey Mensah founded Ghana Music in August 2001. Established during the early stages of internet adoption in Ghana, the website became a premier destination for news, interviews, and media regarding the Ghanaian music industry. The platform played a significant role in documenting the rise of the Hiplife genre and exporting Ghanaian music culture to the diaspora.

In 2011, the platform celebrated its 10th anniversary, marking a decade of influence in the West African digital media landscape. By 2015, the site was averaging over 500,000 monthly visitors and had become a primary source for international media looking for Ghanaian music stories. Mensah's editorial direction has emphasized authentic storytelling, artist empowerment, and cultural preservation, helping to bring Ghanaian sounds to a wider African and diaspora audience.

Style Afrique: In addition to his music ventures, Mensah founded Style Afrique, a digital platform focused on African fashion, lifestyle, and culture, showcasing trends and designers from the continent.

MiPROMO: Nii Abbey Mensah serves as the CEO of MiPROMO, a neo-media company specializing in digital music distribution, YouTube monetization, and social media marketing. Under his leadership, the company became a key partner for Ghanaian musicians and managed the YouTube channels and digital rights for numerous top-tier artists, including Shatta Wale, Sarkodie, and Stonebwoy. It currently manages the digital rights for other top-tier artists and content creators such as McBrown, Strongman, Empress Gifty, Hammer of the Last Two, and Esther Piesie, among many others.

In 2025, Nii Abbey Mensah led MiPROMO into a strategic partnership with Virgin Music Group, aiming to expand the global reach of Ghanaian artists further.

== Awards and Recognition ==
Nii Abbey Mensah's work in the digital space has received industry recognition:

- The President's Lifetime Achievement Awards (2024): The award recognized Nii Abbey's lifetime commitment to building a stronger nation through volunteer service.
- Ghana Business Awards (2020): Nii Abbey Mensah and MiPROMO were nominated for “Promising CEO of the Year” and “Promising Company of the Year” respectively.

== Personal life ==
Nii Abbey Mensah is married with three children.
