= Joe Mensah =

Ghanaian highlife musician

- Origin: Ghana
- Died: 2003
- Genres: Highlife
- Occupation(s): Singer, musician

Joe Mensah (died 2003) was a Ghanaian singer and musician. Described as a music icon of Ghana, he is one of the progenitors of the highlife music genre and among the more renowned highlife musicians of the 1950s and 1960s. His hit songs include "Bonsue" and "Rokpokpo" from his 1977 album The Afrikan Hustle.

Mensah played an essential role in the creation of the Ghana Musicians Union and served as its first president. While in the United States he studied music at the Juilliard School and founded a radio show on WKCR at Columbia University featuring African music, which continues today.
