= Guillaume Lejean =

French explorer (1828–1871)

Guillaume Marie Lejean
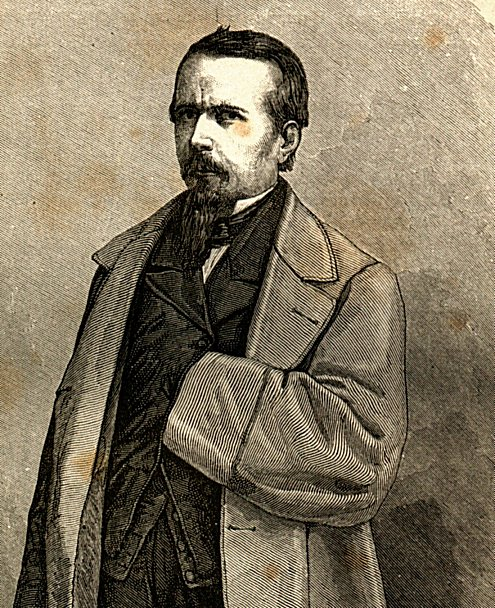
- Born: February 1, 1828; Plouégat-Guérand
- Died: February 2, 1871 (aged 43); Plouégat-Guérand
- Occupation(s): Explorer, ethnographer

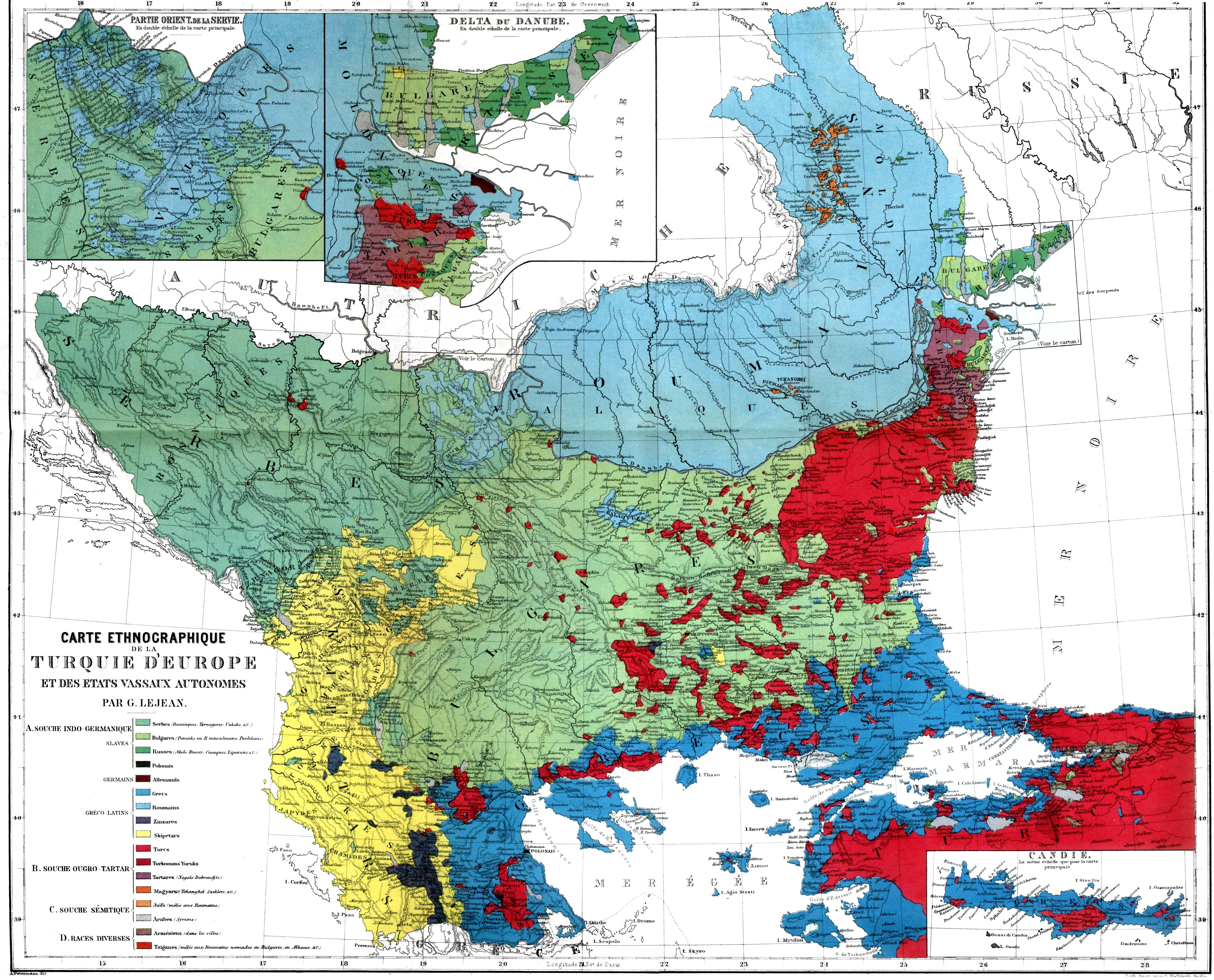
Ethnographic map of European Turkey and its vassal states. Guillaume Lejean, 1861.

Guillaume Lejean (1 February, 1828 in Plouégat-Guérand – 2 February, 1871 in Plouégat-Guérand) was a Breton of French citizenship who was an explorer and ethnographer.

== Works ==
- Ethnographie de la Turquie d'Europe (French for "Ethnography of Turkey of Europe."). Gotha: Justus Perthes, 1861
- Voyage aux deux Nils (French for "Travel to the two Niles"). Paris, 1865–68
- Théodore II, le nouvel empire d'Abyssinie et les intérèts francais (French for "Theodore II, the new empire of Abyssinia and the French interests"). Paris, 1865
