= Beni-Amer people =

Ethnic group in Sudan and Eritrea

Beni-Amer (of Beja people)
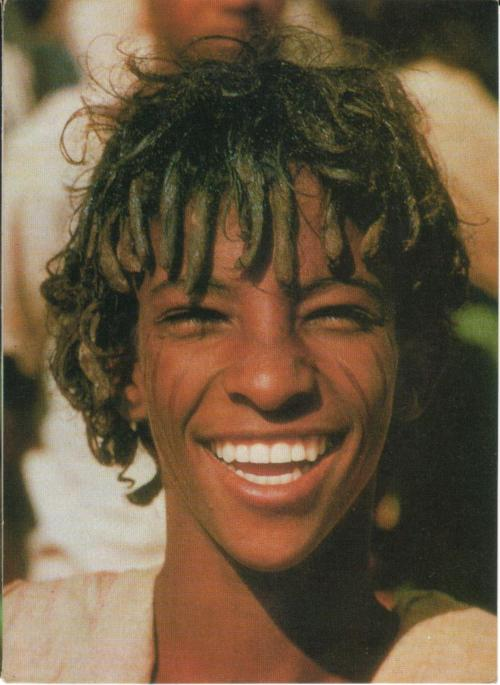
- Beni-Amer Boy, National Geographic, Eritrea, 1965.

Total population
- 442,000

Regions with significant populations
- Eritrea: Unknown
- Sudan: 235,389 (1993)

Languages
- Tigre, Arabic, Beja

Religion
- Islam

Related ethnic groups
- other Beja people

The Beni-Amer, also written as Beni-Amir (Tigrinya: በን ዓምር, Arabic: بني عامر, romanized: Banī ʿĀmir) (sometimes simply as Amer or Nabtab), are a population inhabiting northeast Africa. They are considered by some to comprise a subgroup of the Beja people. They live in Sudan and Eritrea. They are mostly Muslim and constitute the largest tribal confederation in Eritrea.

== Demographics and distribution ==
Some 300,000 people in northeastern Africa belong to the Beni-Amer ethnic group. They live near the Red Sea around the borders of Eritrea and Sudan. The majority having settled permanently in Sudan or mixed into the larger pastoralist communities of Eritrea.

The Beni-Amer people probably emerged in the fourteenth century AD from the intermixing of the Beja and the Tigre. The Beni-Amer occupy the borders between much of Eritrea's Barka valley, Port Sudan, Tokar, and the Kassala areas of eastern Sudan.

== History ==
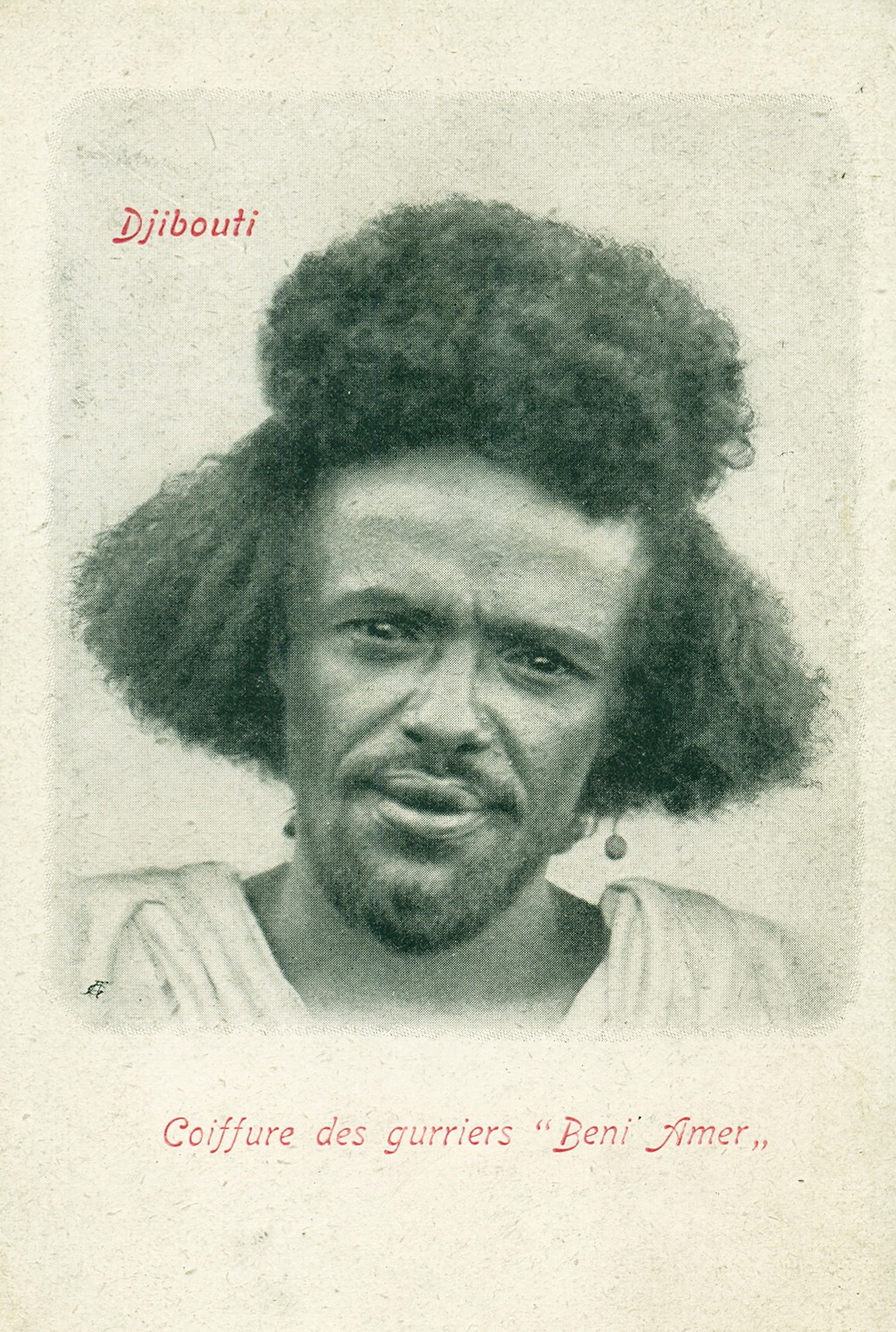
French Postcard from beginning of 20th century: Hairstyle of the warriors "Beni Amer"

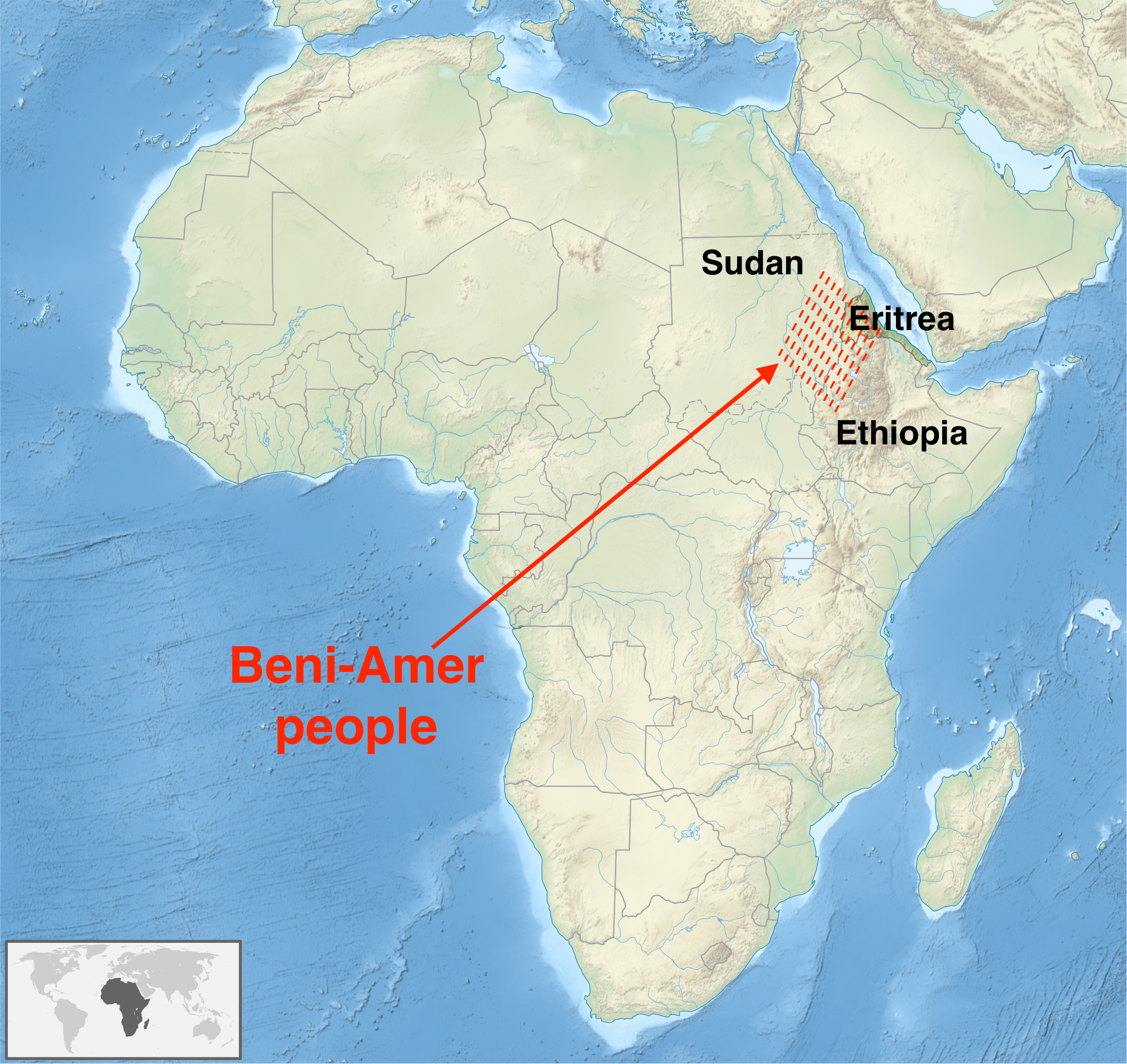
Distribution of the Beni-Amer people (approx)

The Beni-Amer people became politically significant in the 16th century when their founder Amer Kunu – the son of a Muslim holy man named Ali Nabit – joined forces with the Funj and the Ja'alin to defeat the Belew rulers of Eritrea and the surrounding region. Amer's descendants, or Beni-Amer in Arabic, became the new ruling class called Nabtabs who allied themselves with Diglal as the paramount chief ruler. A confederation of many subtribes accepted the new rule, and these therefrom have been the Beni-Amer people.

The Beni Amer remained aligned to the Funj, and paid annual tribute to them until 1821. They became a party to the Italian colonialism when they partnered with the Italians to defeat the Sudanese Mahdiyya in the 1880s. During World War II, the Beni Amer ruling class supported the Italians. The defeat of Italy led to a regional power shake up and reduction in the military powers of the Beni Amer.

== Social stratification ==
The Beni Amer people have a highly stratified social structure. The ruling caste, that consider themselves to be true descendants of Amer or Nabtab, have controlled the economic and political decisions. They constitute less than 10% of their total population. The others members of the Nabtab family belong to the Hedarab, Hadendowa, and Tigre. During the British occupation, author James C. Olson claimed the other descendants of the Nabtab line played a subservient role to the Beni Amir and were relegated to a serf caste. Major subdivisions of Tigre, which at 35%, are the second largest group in Eritrea were occupationally isolated, such as the Almada and Asfada could produce and supply milk, but Hamasein, Abhasheila and Wilinnoho were not allowed to. The Nabtabs also levied taxes and collected periodic tributes from his serfs.

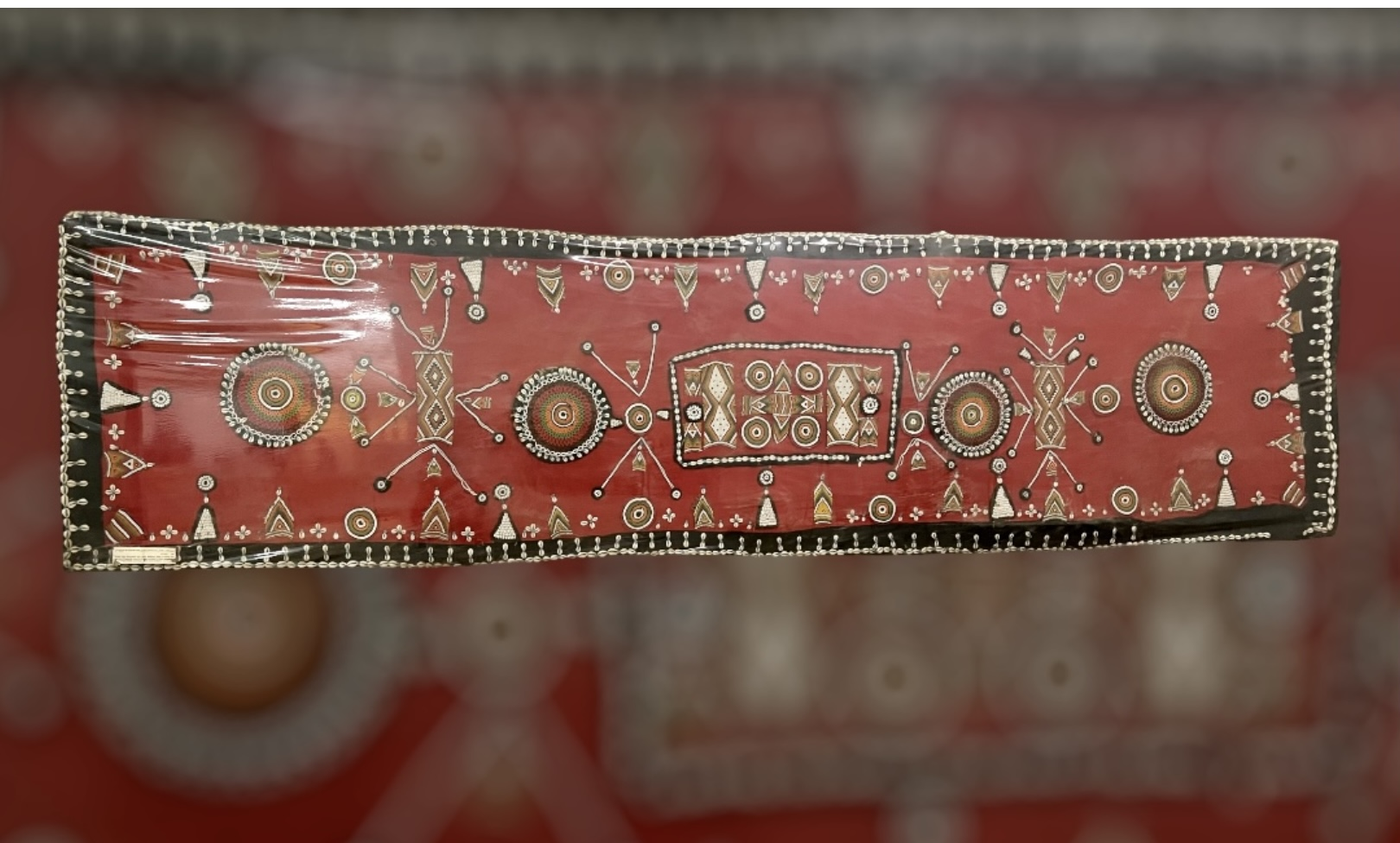
Beni-Amer Bridal mat, Sudan Ethnographic Museum, 2022

According to Paul, ever since Amer Kunu came to power, intermarriage between Nabtab and Tigre castes were forbidden and the caste distinctions were strictly enforced. This was successfully accomplished by the small elite, states Paul, through the "force of arms".

== Livelihood ==
They lead a tribal pastoral life, with those in the northern territories raising camels, and the southerners raising cattle. In contemporary era, many have adopted a farming lifestyle and become migrant wage labor providers.
