= Hergigo =

Hergigo Hirg-Higo حرقيقو
- Town
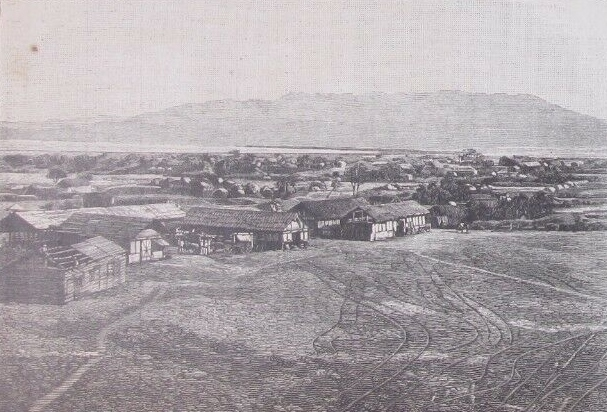
- Hergigo in 1888

- Location in Eritrea.
- Coordinates: 15°32′N 39°27′E
- Country: Eritrea
- Region: Northern Red Sea
- Time zone: UTC+3 (EAT)

Hergigo (Tigre: ሕርጊጎ; Arabic: حرقيقو;, Afar and Saho: Hirg-Higo, alternately Archigo, Arqiqo, Ercoco, Hirgigo, Hargigo, Hergigo or Harkiko) historically known as Dokono is a town in the Northern Red Sea region of Eritrea. Situated on the Red Sea, it lies on the mainland across from the city of Massawa.

== Etymology ==
Hergigo or known by the locals Saho tribe; the clans of Dasamo, as Hirg-Higo. The clan of Dasamo are the inhabitant of this area, it is also known by the name Dakhano, from either the Saho or Afar word for "elephant". The meaning of Higo is legend of legends in Saho language. Richard Pankhurst explains this etymology to the importance of the ivory trade to Hirg-Higo or known as Hergigo.

== History ==
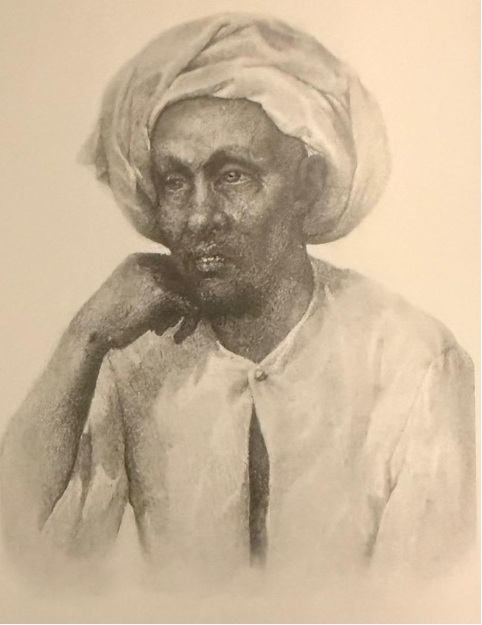
Ruler of Hergigo, Naib Hassan in the nineteenth century

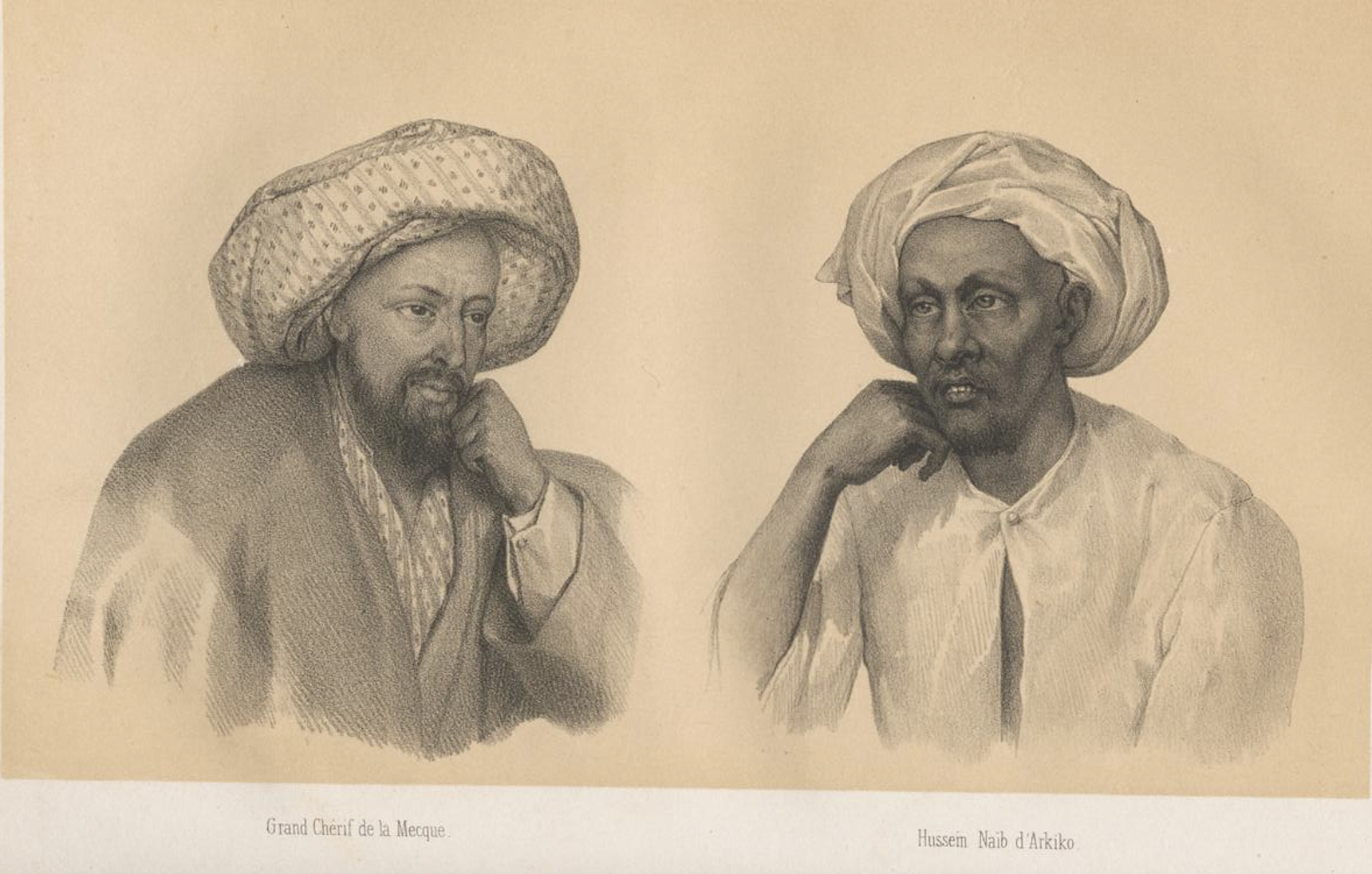
"Hussem Naib" with a sharif from Mecca on the Red Sea coast near Massawa, a member of the nayeb family of Hirgigo; the name is given as in the plate. Engraving from the atlas of Théophile Lefebvre's expedition (1839–1843), Voyage en Abyssinie (Paris: Arthus Bertrand, 1845–1851).

Hergigo and the nearby island port of Massawa handled most of northern Ethiopia's foreign trade at this time. According to the Portuguese, exports in the early 16th century consisted of gold and ivory, as well as honey, wax, and slaves. Despite their economic interdependence, politically the two ports were often divided. In the 1520s, Hergigo was under the control of the Christian Bahr Negash, whereas Massawa belonged to the Muslim ruler of Dahlak.

Hergigo, as a mainland port with easy access from the interior, was under Christian Abyssinian control for many centuries. Francisco Álvares, who visited the town in 1520, recorded that the port's two thousand inhabitants, upon learning that their visitors were Christians like them, rushed down to the water's edge and with "great delight", all jumped into the sea attempting to drag the vessel ashore. As for Massawa, Álvares recalled that the port, which enjoyed local autonomy, was situated on an offshore island and unlike Hergigo was entirely inhabited by Muslims. In the sixteenth century, Sherif Nur ibn Ibrahim, an adherent of Ahmed ibn Ibrahim al-Ghazi, served as the Adal governor overseeing the port city.

Later, in 1557, both ports fell under the control of the Ottoman Empire, which established a fort at Hergigo and stationed a garrison there. In the late 1579, Emperor Sarsa Dengel, unwilling to accept the Turkish presence, led an Ethiopian force to the coast, aiming to secure access to the sea. According to Ottoman records, the force—composed of Christians and local Muslims referred to as "Arabs"—captured Hergigo, destroyed its fort, and looted the settlement. They then advanced to Massawa, where they reportedly killed forty of the hundred-strong Ottoman garrison.

In 1589, Emperor Sarsa Dengel launched another bold assault on Hergigo to counter Turkish expansion but failed to capture the fort. Despite this, the Jesuits in the region remained hopeful for Portuguese intervention to expel the Turks from the coast, with Francesco Lopes writing in 1591, "We await a fleet which will drive out the Turks and restore Massawa to the Emperor." Meanwhile, the Ottomans, unable to advance further into northern Ethiopia, began losing interest in the region. While maintaining a small garrison at Massawa, they handed control of Hergigo to a local Balaw chieftain from Samhar, granting him the title of naib, or "deputy"—a position that would persist among his successors for over two centuries. The Ottomans recognised their power their influence and control over the Samhar region, the Balaw played a major role in local history. During the Egyptian occupation, a member of the Na'ib family was made the Sirdar of the troops in Massawa. The Balaw of Samhar also helped spread Islam in Eritrea. They were granted land in the highlands by the Ras of Tigray, which became centres for Islamic teaching. Their agents traveled widely, collecting tribute and trade dues.

Hergigo was the seat of the Nayebs (from Arabic: نائب, romanized: nāʾib, lit. 'deputy'), a hereditary line of rulers from the Balaw lineage. The Ottomans appointed them, probably around the middle of the seventeenth century, to govern the mainland opposite Massawa. By 1673 the traveller Evliya Çelebi described Hergigo as ruled by a Balaw nayeb with a Turkish garrison. From Hergigo, the nayebs controlled the caravan routes to the highlands and levied duties on trade entering Massawa. By the mid-eighteenth century they had become the most powerful rulers between the Red Sea coast and the highland plateau. The Scottish traveller James Bruce, in the late 18th century, wrote that Hergigo had "about 400 houses", Bruce also noted that the Ottoman fort had decayed to no more than "a small clay hut", and had only one swivel-gun which was not mounted, but lay on the ground, and was "fired always with great trepidation and some danger". The town suffered during the struggles of the 1840s. Egyptian forces burned it and destroyed the nayeb's houses in 1847, and the army of Wube Haile Maryam raided it in 1849. The family's two branches, the Bayt Hasan and the Bayt 'Uthman, continued to hold office under Egyptian and Italian rule.

Hergigo had owed its importance due to its intermediary position between the island port of Massawa and the mainland, but this was destroyed when the Egyptians, in the 1870s, constructed a causeway linking island and mainland, which caused Hergigo to rapidly decline. The place was described by the Guida dell'Africa Orientale Italiana in 1938 as no more than a "large village", albeit one with a 370-metre-long landing- stage and some warehouses.

On April 6, 1975, and December 31, 1976, the Ethiopian army carried out twin massacres in Hergigo, slaughtering roughly 300 civilians in each incident, burning homes, and forcing the surviving population into displacement and exile. Executed as collective punishment for alleged civilian support to liberation fighters, the Ethiopian military intended these atrocities to terrorize the local population and deter youth from joining the independence movement. Instead of pacifying the region, the brutality backfired completely. The grief and rage ignited by the destruction drove hundreds of surviving youth and displaced residents into the ranks of the liberation movement. This surge in recruits strengthened the resistance across the Red Sea coast, directly contributing to the military momentum that led to the eventual defeat of the same army responsible for the massacres.

Also located in this town is Eritrea's largest power generation facility. This facility was partially destroyed during the Eritrean-Ethiopian War, but has now been fully repaired.

== Climate and habitat ==
The region is reputedly one of the hottest inhabited places on earth, with temperatures soaring well above 40°C (104°F) for much of the year, combined with an average annual rainfall of less than two centimetres (an inch).

Formerly covering significant portions of the Eritrean coast, original mangrove forest was destroyed by overgrazing by camels or cutting for firewood or the building of homes and boats.

== Economy ==
Today, Hergigo is the site of the artificial planting on mangrove trees with the help of low-cost slow-release fertilizer packs of nitrogen, phosphorus and iron, allowing the plant growth in areas previously uninhabited by trees. It is supported by the Eritrean Ministry of Fisheries, in the hope to restore mangrove coastline boosting the numbers of livestock, fish and seafood.

== Notable people ==
- Nayeb dynasty of Hergigo rulers, who governed the Samhar region and mainland coast from Hergigo during the Ottoman and Egyptian periods.
- Sheikh Saleh Kekia (1893–1975), businessman, philanthropist, and prominent political figure in Eritrea's independence movement.
- Osman Saleh Sabbe (1938–1996), political leader, diplomat, and author who played a foundational role in the Eritrean liberation movement.
- Ibrahim Afa was an Eritrean guerrilla commander during the Eritrean War of Independence.
- Romodan Mohammed Nur (1938–2021), co-founder and first General Secretary of the EPLF.
- Ali Said Abdella (1949–2005), military commander, diplomat, and former Minister of Foreign Affairs.
- Alamin Mohammed Seid (1947–2021), veteran freedom fighter and long-time Secretary of the PFDJ.
- Ahmed Baduri, diplomat and former Permanent Representative of Eritrea to the United Nations.
- Dr. Muhammad Osman Abubaker, historian, author, and politician who wrote extensively on Eritrean history and the Red Sea region.
- Fozia Hashim, jurist and Minister of Justice of Eritrea.
- Romodan Osman Awliya, military officer with the rank of major general in the Eritrean Defence Forces (EDF).
