= Tigre language =

Semitic language spoken in the Horn of Africa

Tigre
- ትግሬ (Təgré), ትግራይት (Tigrayit)
- Native to: Eritrea, Sudan
- Region: Anseba, Gash-Barka, Northern Red Sea, Red Sea State
- Ethnicity: Tigre
- Native speakers: 1 million (2022–2024)
- Language family: Afro-Asiatic: Semitic; West Semitic; South Semitic; Ethio-Semitic; North; Dahalik–Tigre; Tigre
- Dialects: Mansa (Mensa), Habab, Beni-Amir, Semhar, Algeden, Senhit (Ad-Tekleis, Ad-Temariam, Bet-Juk, Marya Kayah)
- Writing system: Geʽez script (Tigre abugida); Arabic script

Official status
- Recognised minority language in: Eritrea; Sudan

Language codes
- ISO 639-2: tig
- ISO 639-3: tig
- Glottolog: tigr1270

Tigre (ትግሬ, Təgré), also known as Tigrayit (ትግራይት), is an Ethio-Semitic language of the Afroasiatic language family spoken in the Horn of Africa, primarily by the Tigre people of Eritrea. It is believed to be the most closely related living language to Ge'ez, which is still in use as the liturgical language of the Eritrean Orthodox Tewahedo Church. Tigre has a lexical similarity of 71% with Ge’ez and of 64% with Tigrinya. As of 1997, Tigre was spoken by approximately 800,000 Tigre people in Eritrea. The Tigre mainly inhabit western Eritrea, though they also reside in the northern highlands of Eritrea and its extension into the adjacent parts of Sudan, as well as Eritrea's Red Sea coast north of Zula. There is a small number of Tigre speakers in Sudan, as well as communities of speakers found in the diaspora.

The Tigre language is not to be confused with the Tigrinya language of Ethiopia and Eritrea, which is quite distinct from Tigre despite the similarity in name.

== History ==
=== Origins and classification ===
Tigre is usually placed in the same group as Ge'ez and Tigrinya, known as North Ethio-Semitic. However, researchers do not agree that the three languages come from a single shared ancestor. Some specialists argue that they look alike because they all kept many old features and because they were spoken in neighboring areas, not because they split from one parent language. Certain verb forms that exist only in Tigre suggest it may have been the first language to break away from the rest of the Ethio-Semitic family, although the evidence is mixed.

=== Aksumite period ===
Tigre is believed to have been one of several languages spoken in the Kingdom of Aksum, along with Ge'ez, an early form of Tigrinya, and the Agaw languages. It was probably the main language of the people living around the port city of Adulis. Researchers often link Tigre speakers to a people called the Tigrētai, mentioned by the 6th-century traveler Cosmas Indicopleustes, though some have suggested these may have been Tigrinya speakers instead. In Aksum, Ge'ez was the language of writing and official use. Neither early Tigre nor early Tigrinya was written down, either during the Aksumite period or for many centuries after it.

=== Medieval records ===
After Aksum declined, Muslim traders along the Red Sea coast, many of them from the Dahlak Archipelago, wrote in Arabic. These traders were most likely Arabs who had settled in the region and mixed with local Tigre or Tigrinya speakers who had converted to Islam. One of the earliest written records of Tigre is a 14th-century word list of Arabic and Ethiopian languages, made for the Rasulid ruler of Yemen, al-Malik al-Afḍal.

== Dialects ==
There are several dialects of Tigre, including Mansa’ (Mensa), Habab, Barka, Semhar, Algeden, Senhit (Ad-Tekleis, Ad-Temariam, Bet-Juk, Marya Kayah), and Dahalik, which is spoken in the Dahlak Archipelago. Intelligibility between the dialects is above 91% (except Dahalik), where intelligibility between Dahalik and the other dialects is between 24% and 51%.

Tigre speakers in Sudan also call the language "hāsā". However the term 'Hasa', and other variations of the term such as 'Xasa' or 'Khasa', is considered pejorative by the Tigre.

== Vocabulary ==
=== Numerals ===
The cardinal and ordinal numbers in Tigre are as follows:

Number	Cardinal		Ordinal		
Number	Masculine	Feminine	Neutral	Masculine	Feminine
1	አሮ, ’aro	ሐቴ, ḥate or ሐንቴ, ḥante	አወል, ’awel	አወላይ, ’awelay	አወላይት, ’awelayit
1	አሮ, ’aro	ሐቴ, ḥate or ሐንቴ, ḥante	ቀዳም, q’edam	ቀዳማይ, q’edamay	ቀዳሚት, q’edamit
2	ክልኤ, kili’ē		ከልእ, kel’	ከለኣይ, kele’ay	ከለኣይት, kele’ayt
3	ሰለአስ, sel’ās		ሰልስ, sals		
4	አርበዕ, ’arbaʽe		ረብዕ, rabʽe		
5	ሐምስ, ḥams or ሐሙስ, ḥamus		ሐምስ, ḥams		
6	ስእስ, si’es or ሱስ, sus		ሰድስ, sads		
7	ሰቡዕ, sebuʽi		ሰብዕ, sabʽe		
8	ሰመን, seman		ሰምን, samn		
9	ሰዕ, siʽe		ተስዕ, tasʽe		
10	ዐስር, ʽasr		ዐስር, ʽasr		
11	ዐስር-ሐተ, ʽasr-hatte				
20	ዕስረ, ʽisra				
21	ዕስረ ወሐተ, ʽisra w ḥate				
30	ሰለሰ, selasa				
40	አርበዐ, arbaʽa				
50	ሐምሰ, ḥamsa				
100	ምእት, mi’et				
200	ክልኤ ምእት, kil’e mi’et				
300	ሰለአስ ምእት, seles mi’et				
1000	አልፍ, ’alf				

Ordinal numbers have both feminine and masculine form. To specify the masculine form, -ay is added to the end of the word, while the feminine form is specified by the ending -ayt.

== Phonology ==
Tigre has preserved the two pharyngeal consonants of Ge'ez. The Ge'ez vowel inventory has almost been preserved except that the two vowels which are phonetically close to [ɐ] and [a] seem to have evolved into a pair of phonemes which have the same quality (the same articulation) but differ in length; [a] vs. [aː]. The original phonemic distinction according to quality survives in Tigrinya. The vowel [ɐ], traditionally named "first order vowel", is most commonly transcribed ä in Semitic linguistics.

The phonemes of Tigre are displayed below in both International Phonetic Alphabet (IPA) symbols (indicated by the IPA brackets) and the symbols common (though not universal) among linguists who work on Ethiopian Semitic languages. For the long vowel /aː/, the symbol 'ā' is used per Raz (1983). Three consonants, /p, p', x/, occur only in a small number of loanwords, hence they are written in parentheses.

As in other Ethiopian Semitic languages, the phonemic status of /ə/ is questionable; it may be possible to treat it as an epenthetic vowel that is introduced to break up consonant clusters.

Consonants
		Labial	Dental	Palatal	Velar	Pharyngeal	Glottal
Nasal		m	n				
Stop	voiceless	(p)	t	tʃ ⟨č⟩	k		ʔ
Stop	voiced	b	d	dʒ ⟨ǧ⟩	ɡ		ʔ
Stop	ejective	(pʼ)	tʼ	tʃʼ ⟨č'⟩	kʼ		ʔ
Fricative	voiceless	f	s	ʃ ⟨š⟩	(x)	ħ	h
Fricative	voiced		z	ʒ ⟨ž⟩		ʕ	
Fricative	ejective		sʼ				
Approximant			l	j ⟨y⟩	w		
Rhotic			r				

Vowels
	Front	Central	Back
Close	i	ɨ ⟨ə⟩	u
Mid	e		o
Open		a, aː ⟨ā⟩	

=== Consonant length ===
Consonant length is phonemic in Tigre (that is, a pair of words can be distinct by consonant length alone), although there are few such minimal pairs. Some consonants do not occur long; these include the pharyngeal consonants, the glottal consonants, /w/, and /j/. In this language, long consonants arise almost solely by gemination as a morphological process; there are few, if any, long consonants in word roots. Gemination is especially prominent in verb morphology.

== Grammar ==
Nouns are of two genders, masculine and feminine.

- Indefinite article: masculine woro አሮ e.g. woro enas አሮ እናስ – a man; feminine hatte ሐቴ e.g. hatte sit ሐቴ እሲት – a woman.
- The definite article, "the", when expressed, is la ለ e.g. ለጸሓይ ወ ለወርሕ – the sun and the moon.

As with other Semitic languages, specifically feminine forms, where they exist, are often formed of an element with an affix:

- masculine: አድግ ʼadəg- donkey, ass; feminine: እድግት ʼədgət – she-ass;
- masculine: ከልብ kalb – dog; feminine: ከልበት kalbat – bitch;
- masculine: ከድመይ kadmay – serving man; ከድመይት kadmayt – serving-woman;
- masculine: መምበ mamba – lord, master; መምበይት mambayt – lady, mistress.

In a similar way, sound-changes can also mark the difference between singular and plural:

- ንጉስ nəgus – king; negüs – kings;
- በሐር bäḥär – sea; አብሑር ʼäbhur – seas;
- እሲት ʼəsit – woman; አንስ ʼäns – women;
- ወለት wälät – girl; አዋልድ ʼäwaləd – girls;
- መሆር mähor – foal, colt; አምሁር ʼämhur – foals, colts;
- ነቢ näbi – prophet; ነቢያት näbiyat – prophets;
- ብጉዕ bəgu – one sheep; አባግዕ äbagəʼʽ – sheep, plural;
- አርዌ ʼärwē – Snake; አረዊት ʼärawit – snakes, plural;
- ሖግ ḥog – foot; ሐነግ ḥanag – feet; plural
- እገር ʼəgər – foot; አእጋር ʼä’əgār feet; plural
- እዝን ʼəzin – ear; አእዛን ʼäʼəzān – ears;
- ሰዐት säʽät – hour; ሰዓታትsäʽatat – hours;
- አንፍ ʼänəf – nose; አንፎታት ʼänfotāt – noses;
- ህዳይ həday – wedding; ህድያት hədyat – weddings;
- አብ ʼāb – father; አበች ʼābatʃ – fathers;
- እም ʼəm – mother; እማት ʼəmawat – mothers;
- ኮከብ kokeb – star;ከዋክብ kawākəb – stars;
- ጓነ gʷāna – foreigner;ጓኖታት gʷānotāt – foreigners;
- ረአስ raʼas – head; አርእስ ʼarʼəs – heads;
- ጸፍር ṣəfər – paw, hoof; አጸፍር ʼāṣäfər – claws, hooves;
- ከብድ kabəd – belly; አክቡድ ʼākbud – bellies.
- ልባስ ləbbas- ለበብሰ lababbəs clothes

Personal pronouns distinguish "you, masculine" and "you, feminine" in both singular and plural:

- አነ ʼana – I, me
- እንተ ʼənta – you, singular, masculine
- እንቲ ʼənti – you, singular, feminine
- ህቱ hətu – he, him, it (masc.)
- ህተ həta – she, her, it (fem.)
- ሕነ ḥənna – we, us
- እንቱም ʼəntum – you, plural, masculine
- እንትን ʼəntən – you, plural, feminine
- ህቶም hətom – they, them, masculine
- ህተን həten – they, them, feminine

The possessive pronouns appear (a) suffixed to the noun, (b) as separate words:

- my – (a) -ya የ example: kətābya ክታብየ- my book; (b) nāy ናየ with masculine nouns; nāya ናየ with feminine nouns;
- your (sing. mas. & fem.) – (a) -ka ካ example: kətābka ክታብካ- your book; (b) with masc. nāyka ናይካ, with fem. nāyki ናይኪ;
- his – (a) -u -ኡ example kətābu ክታቡ – his book; (b) with masc. nāyu ናዩ, with fem. nāya ናያ;
- our – (a) -na ና example kətābna ክታብና – our book; (b) with masc. nāyna ናይና, with fem. nāyna ናይና;
- your (pl. masc. & fem.) – (a) -kum ኩም (a) -kən ክን example kətabkum ክታብኩም/ክታብክን- your book; (b) with masc. nāykum ናይኩም, with fem. nāykən ናይክን;
- their – -om -ኦም example kətābom ክታቦም- their book; (b) with masc. nāyom,ናዮም with fem. nāyan ናየን.

The verb "to be":

- ana halleko (o) tu – አና ሀለኮ I am; negative: ihalleko ኢሀለኮ- I'm not;
- enta halleko (o) tu – እንታ ህሌካ you (sing. masc.) are; neg. ihalleko ኢሀለኮ- you're not;
- enti halleki tu – እንቲ ሀሌኪ you (sing. fem.) are; neg. ihalleko ኢሀለኮ;
- hətu halla tu ህቱ ሀላ- he is; neg. ihalla ኢሀላ;
- həta hallet tu ህታ ሀሌት – she is; neg. ihallet ኢሀሌት;
- henna hallena tu ሕና ሀሌና – we are; neg. ihallena ኢሀሌና;
- entum hallekum tu እንቱም ሀሌኩም- you (pl. masc.) are; neg. ihallekum ኢሀሌኩም;
- entim halleken tu እንትን ሀሌክን- you (pl. fem.) are; neg. ihallekum ኢሀሌክን;
- hətən hallaa tom ህተን ሀሌያ- they (masc.) are; neg. ihallao ኢሀሌያ;
- hətən halleia ten ህተን ሀሌያ – they (fem.) are; neg. ihallao ኢሀሌያ.

The verb "to be", past tense:

- ...ʿalko ዐልኮ- I was; negative: iʿalko ኢዐልኮ- I wasn't;
- ...ʿalka ዐልካ- you (sing. masc.) were; neg. iʿalka ኢዐልካ;
- ...ʿalki ዐልኪ- you (sing. fem.) were; neg. iʿalka ኢዐልኪ;
- ...ʿala ዐላ- he was; neg. iʿala ኢዐላ;
- ...ʿalet ዐለት- she was; neg. iʿallet ኢዐለት;
- ...ʿalna ዐልና- we were; neg. iʿalna ኢዐልና;
- ...ʿalkum ዐልኩም- you (pl. masc.) were; neg. iʿalkum ኢዐልኩም;
- ...ʿalken ዐልክን- you (pl. fem.) were; neg. iʿalkum ኢዐልክን;
- ...ʿalou ዐለው- they (masc.) were; neg. iʿalou ኢዐለው;
- ...ʿalaia ዐለያ- they (fem.) were; neg. iʿaleia ኢዐለያ.

The verb "to have":

- woro kitab bye ዎሮ ኪታብ ብየ – I have a book
- woro kitab bəka ዎሮ ክታብ ብካ- You (sing. masc.) have a book,

and so on, with the last word in each case:

- ...bəki ብኪ – you (sing. fem.), etc.
- ...bu ቡ – he...
- ...ba በ – she...
- ...bəna ብና- we...
- ...bəkum ብኩም- you (pl. masc.)...
- ...bəkin ብክን- you (pl.fem.) ...
- ...bom ቦም- they (masc.)...
- ...ben በን- they (fem.)...

The verb "to have": past tense, using a feminine noun as an example:

- ḥätte bet ʿalet ilu ሐተ ቤት ዐልት እሉ – He had a house
- ḥätte bet ʿalet ilka ሐተ ቤት ዐልት እልካ- You (sing. masc.) you had a house,

and so on, with the last word in each case:

- ...ʿalet əlki ዐለት እልኪ – you (sing. fem.) had a house,
- ...ʿalet əllu ዐለት እሉ- he had, etc.
- ...ʿalet əlla ዐለት እላ- she had...
- ...ʿalet əlna ዐለት እልና- we had...
- ...ʿalet əlkum ዐለት እልኩም- you pl. masc.) had ...
- ...ʿalet əlkən ዐለት እልክን- you (pl. fem.) had ...
- ...ʿalet əlom ዐለት እሎም- they (masc.) had ...
- ...ʿalet əllen ዐለት እለን- they (fem.) had ...

== Writing system ==
Since around 1889, the Geʽez script (Ethiopic script) has been used to write the Tigre language. Tigre speakers formerly used Arabic more widely as a lingua franca. The Bible has been translated into the Tigre language.

=== Ge'ez script ===
The Ge'ez script is an abugida, with each character representing a consonant and vowel combination. Ge'ez and its script are also called Ethiopic. The script has been modified slightly to write Tigre and is mainly employed by the Eritrean government and Christian speakers.

Tigre Ge'ez script
	ä	u	i	a	e	ə	o	wä	wi	wa	we	wə
h	ሀ	ሁ	ሂ	ሃ	ሄ	ህ	ሆ					
l	ለ	ሉ	ሊ	ላ	ሌ	ል	ሎ					
ḥ	ሐ	ሑ	ሒ	ሓ	ሔ	ሕ	ሖ					
m	መ	ሙ	ሚ	ማ	ሜ	ም	ሞ					
r	ረ	ሩ	ሪ	ራ	ሬ	ር	ሮ					
s	ሰ	ሱ	ሲ	ሳ	ሴ	ስ	ሶ					
š	ሸ	ሹ	ሺ	ሻ	ሼ	ሽ	ሾ					
ḳ	ቀ	ቁ	ቂ	ቃ	ቄ	ቅ	ቆ	ቈ	ቊ	ቋ	ቌ	ቍ
b	በ	ቡ	ቢ	ባ	ቤ	ብ	ቦ					
t	ተ	ቱ	ቲ	ታ	ቴ	ት	ቶ					
č	ቸ	ቹ	ቺ	ቻ	ቼ	ች	ቾ					
ḫ	ኀ	ኁ	ኂ	ኃ	ኄ	ኅ	ኆ	ኈ	ኊ	ኋ	ኌ	ኍ
n	ነ	ኑ	ኒ	ና	ኔ	ን	ኖ					
ʾ	አ	ኡ	ኢ	ኣ	ኤ	እ	ኦ					
k	ከ	ኩ	ኪ	ካ	ኬ	ክ	ኮ	ኰ	ኲ	ኳ	ኴ	ኵ
w	ወ	ዉ	ዊ	ዋ	ዌ	ው	ዎ					
ʿ	ዐ	ዑ	ዒ	ዓ	ዔ	ዕ	ዖ					
z	ዘ	ዙ	ዚ	ዛ	ዜ	ዝ	ዞ					
ž	ዠ	ዡ	ዢ	ዣ	ዤ	ዥ	ዦ					
y	የ	ዩ	ዪ	ያ	ዬ	ይ	ዮ					
d	ደ	ዱ	ዲ	ዳ	ዴ	ድ	ዶ					
ǧ	ጀ	ጁ	ጂ	ጃ	ጄ	ጅ	ጆ					
g	ገ	ጉ	ጊ	ጋ	ጌ	ግ	ጎ	ጐ	ጒ	ጓ	ጔ	ጕ
ṭ	ጠ	ጡ	ጢ	ጣ	ጤ	ጥ	ጦ					
č̣	ጨ	ጩ	ጪ	ጫ	ጬ	ጭ	ጮ					
p̣	ጰ	ጱ	ጲ	ጳ	ጴ	ጵ	ጶ					
ṣ	ጸ	ጹ	ጺ	ጻ	ጼ	ጽ	ጾ					
f	ፈ	ፉ	ፊ	ፋ	ፌ	ፍ	ፎ					
p	ፐ	ፑ	ፒ	ፓ	ፔ	ፕ	ፖ					
	ä	u	i	a	e	ə	o	wä	wi	wa	we	wə

=== Arabic script ===
The Arabic script is an abjad, meaning only consonants are represented by each character, and diacritics are used for vowels. This script is used more commonly by Muslim speakers.

Tigre Arabic script
Isolated	IPA	Transcription
ا	none or /ʔ/	
ب	/b/	b
پ	/p/	p
ت	/t/	t
ث	/s/	s
ج	/dʒ/	j
ح	/ħ/	ḥ
خ	/x/	x
د	/d/	d
ذ	/z/	z
ر	/r/	r
ز	/z/	z
ژ	/ʒ/	ž
س	/s/	s
ش	/ʃ/	š
ڛ	/tʃ/	c
ص	/s’/	s’
ض	/d/	d
ط	/t’/	t’
ظ	/z/	z
ڟ	/tʃ’/	c’
ع	/ʕ/	ʕ
غ	/g/	g
ف	/f/	f
ڥ	/p’/	p’
ق	/k’/	q
ك	/k/	k
ل	/l/	l
م	/m/	m
ن	/n/	n
ه	/h/	h
و	/w/	w
ي	/j/	y

Tigre Arabic script (vowels)
Diacritic/Letter	IPA	Transcription
َ	/ɐ/	a
ِ	/i/	i
ُ	/u/	u
ْ	none or /ɨ/	none or ə
آ, اَ	/aː/	a
ِـي	/e/	e
ُـو	/o/	o

== Sample text ==
Article 1 of the Universal Declaration of Human Rights:

Tigre text	English text
ክሎም ውላድ ሚንኣደም ምን አምዕል ተውሊደቶም እንዴ አንበተው ሑር ወአክልሕድቶም። አክልሕድ ላቱ ሕቁቅ ወሕሽመት ቦም። ደሚር ወእህትማም ለትሀየበው ኽሉቃም ሰበት ቶም ኖስ-ኖሶም አድሕድ እግል ለሐሽሞ ወልርሐሞ ወጅቦም።	All human beings are born free and equal in dignity and rights. They are endowed with reason and conscience and should act towards one another in a spirit of brotherhood.
kəlom wəlad minəʼadäm mən ʼäməʻəl täwəlidätom ʼənədē ʼänəbätäw ḥur waʼäkələḥədətom. ʼäkələḥəd latu ḥəquq waḥəšəmät bom. dämir waʼəhətəmam lätəhäyäbäw xəluqam säbät tom nosə-nosom ʼädəḥəd ʼəgəl läḥäšəmo walərəḥämo waǧəbom.	All human beings are born free and equal in dignity and rights. They are endowed with reason and conscience and should act towards one another in a spirit of brotherhood.

Basic sentences:

Tigre text	Translation
ሐየት እት ልርእው፣ እብ አሰሩ ሐዙው	When they see a lion, they seek it through its tracks.
ህኩይ ድራሩ ንኩይ	Lazy's dinner is less
ህግየ ፍ’ደት ምን ገብእ። አዚም ደሀብ ቱ	When speaking is an obligation, silence is golden
ምህሮ ኖርቱ ወቅዌት ጽልመት፣	Knowledge is brightness and ignorance darkness.

Other samples:

Tigre text
ሐል ክም እም ኢትገብእ ወጸሓይ ወርሕ ክም አምዕል
ለኢልትሐሜ ኢልትሐመድ፣
ለቤለ ለአሰምዕ ወለዘብጠ ለአደምዕ፣
ሐሊብ መ ውላዱ ሔሰዩ፣
ሐምቅ ሐምቁ ምን ረክብ ዜነት ለአፈግር፣
ምስል ብርድ አከይ ፍርድ

== See also ==
- Beni-Amer people
- Tigre people

== Bibliography ==
- Camperio, Manfredo. Manuale Pratico della Lingua Tigrè, Hoepli, Milano, 1936.
- Beaton, A.C. & A. Paul (1954). A grammar and vocabulary of the Tigre language (as spoken by the Beni Amer). Khartoum: Publications Bureau.
- Elias, David L. (2005). Tigre of Habab: Short Grammar and Texts from the Rigbat People. Ph.D dissertation. Harvard University.
- Elias, David L. (2014). The Tigre Language of Gindaˁ, Eritrea: Short Grammar and Texts. (Studies in Semitic Languages and Linguistics, 75.) Brill.
- Leslau, Wolf. (1945) Short Grammar of Tigré. Publications of the American Oriental Society, Offprint Series, No. 18. New Haven: American Oriental Society.
- Leslau, Wolf. (1945), "The Verb in Tigré", in: Journal of the American Oriental Society 65/1, pp. 1–26.
- Leslau, Wolf. (1945), "Grammatical Sketches in Tigré (North Ethiopic): Dialect of Mensa", in: Journal of the American Oriental Society 65/3, pp. 164–203.
- Leslau, Wolf. (1948), "Supplementary observations on Tigré grammar", in: Journal of the American Oriental Society 68/3, pp. 127–139.
- Littmann, E. (1897), "Die Pronomina in Tigré", in: Zeitschrift für Assyriologie 12, pp. 188–230, 291–316.
- Littmann, Enno. (1898), "Das Verbum der Tigre-Sprache", in: Zeitschrift für Assyrologie 13, pp. 133–178; 14, pp. 1–102.
- Littmann, Enno. (1910–15). Publications of the Princeton expedition to Abyssinia, 4 vols. in 4, Leyden.
- Littmann, Enno. and Höfner, Maria. (1962) Wörterbuch der Tigrē-Sprache: Tigrē-Deutsch-Englisch. Wiesbaden: Franz Steiner Verlag.
- Nakano, Aki'o & Yoichi Tsuge (1982). A Vocabulary of Beni Amer Dialect of Tigre. Tokyo: Institute for the Study of Languages and Cultures of Asia and Africa.
- Palmer, F.R. (1956). "'Openness' in Tigre: a problem in prosodic statement", in: Bulletin of the School of Oriental and African Studies 18/3, pp. 561–577.
- Palmer, F.R. (1961). "Relative clauses in Tigre", in: Word 17/1, pp. 23–33.
- Palmer, F.R. (1962). The morphology of the Tigre noun. London: Oxford University Press.
- Raz, Shlomo. (1980). "Tigre syntax and Semitic Ethiopian", in: Bulletin of the School of Oriental and African Studies 43/2, pp. 235–250.
- Raz, Shlomo. (1980). "The morphology of the Tigre verb (Mansaʿ dialect)", in: Journal of Semitic Studies 25/1, pp. 66–84; 25/2, pp. 205–238.
- Raz, Shlomo. (1983). Tigre grammar and texts. Malibu, California, USA: Undena Publications.
- SALEH MAHMUD IDRIS. (2015). A Comparative Study of the Tigre Dialects, Semitica et Semitohamitica Berolinensia, 18 (Aachen: Shaker Verlag, 2015)
- Sundström, R. (1914). "Some Tigre texts", in: Le Monde Orientale 8, pp. 1–15.
- Voigt, Rainer (2008), "Zum Tigre", in: Aethiopica (International Journal of Ethiopian and Eritrean Studies), volume 11, Wiesbaden: Harrasowitz Verlag 2008, pp. 173–193.
- Voigt, Rainer and Saleh Mahmud Idris. Zu einer neuen Grammatik des Tigre. Aethiopica 19 (2016, pub. 2017), 245–263.
