= 19th Army =

Nineteenth Army or 19th Army may refer to:

== Germany ==
- 19th Army (German Empire), a World War I field Army
- 19th Army (Wehrmacht), a World War II field army

== Others ==
- 19th Route Army, Republic of China
- Nineteenth Army (Japan)
- 19th Army (Soviet Union)

== See also ==
- List of armies by number
- XIX Corps (disambiguation)
- 19th Division (disambiguation)
- 19th Brigade (disambiguation)
- 19th Regiment (disambiguation)
- 19th Battalion (disambiguation)
- 19th Squadron (disambiguation)
- 19th (disambiguation)
