= Nineteenth =

Nineteenth is the ordinal form of the number 19 (number).

Nineteenth or 19th may also refer to:

- A fraction, 1/19th, equal to one of 19 equal parts
- 19th of the month, a recurring calendar date
- 19th birthday, the age of majority in a several countries
- The 19th, nonprofit independent news organization established in Austin, Texas, in 2020

== Geography ==
- 19th meridian east, a line of longitude
- 19th meridian west, a line of longitude
- 19th parallel north, a circle of latitude
- 19th parallel south, a circle of latitude
- 19th Avenue (disambiguation)
- 19th Street (disambiguation)

== Military ==
- 19th Army (disambiguation)
- 19th Battalion (disambiguation)
- 19th Brigade (disambiguation)
- 19th Division (disambiguation)
- 19th Regiment (disambiguation)
- 19th Squadron (disambiguation)

== Other ==
- Nineteenth Amendment (disambiguation)
  - Nineteenth Amendment to the United States Constitution, concerning women's suffrage
- 19th century
- 19th century BC
- Nineteenth United States Congress

== See also ==
- 19 (disambiguation)
