= 19th Cavalry =

19th Cavalry may refer to:

== Regiments and battalions ==
- 19th Alberta Dragoons
- 19th Cavalry Regiment (United States)
- 19th Corps Cavalry Regiment
- 19th Royal Hussars
- 19th (Lothians and Berwickshire) Company, Imperial Yeomanry

=== American Civil War units ===
==== Union Army ====
- 19th New York Cavalry Regiment
- 19th Pennsylvania Cavalry Regiment

==== Confederate Army ====
- 19th Mississippi Cavalry Battalion
- 19th Texas Cavalry Regiment
- 19th Virginia Cavalry Regiment

== See also ==
- 19th Regiment (disambiguation)
- 19th (disambiguation)
