= Five Power Defence Arrangements =

Series of Commonwealth defence relationships from 1971

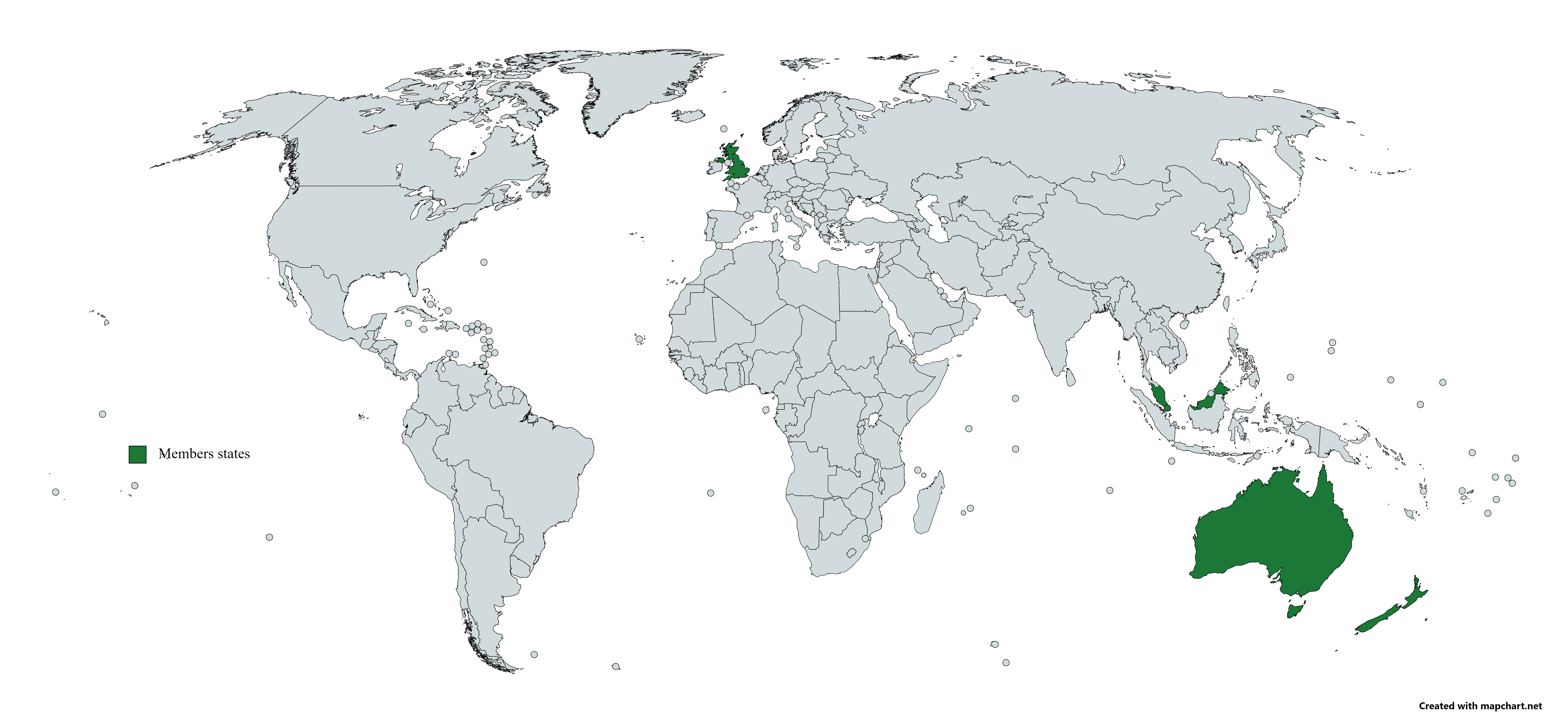
- Member states shown in dark green
- Abbreviation: FPDA
- Founded: 1 November 1971; 54 years ago
- Type: Military alliance
- Headquarters: RMAF Butterworth Air Base; Sembawang Air Base
- Members: Australia; Malaysia; New Zealand; Singapore; United Kingdom

The Five Power Defence Arrangements (FPDA) are a series of bilateral defence relationships established by a series of multi-lateral agreements between the Commonwealth countries Australia, Malaysia, New Zealand, Singapore, and the United Kingdom.

Signed in 1971, the FPDA consists of the five powers consulting each other "immediately" in the event of threat or an armed attack on any of the FPDA members for the purpose of deciding what measures should be taken, jointly or separately in response.

There is no specific commitment to intervene militarily, and the agreement is merely consultative. The Five Powers Defence Arrangements do not refer to exclusive economic zones (EEZ), and the enforcement of a state's EEZ rights is a matter for that state, which may request the assistance of other states in so doing.

== Foundations & principles ==
The FPDA’s founding principles continue to form the bedrock of activities and exercises. First, as a defensive arrangement, the FPDA should maintain a non-threatening posture to avoid rousing sensitivities in the region. Second, as a multilateral security arrangement, the FPDA should proceed at a pace comfortable to all, cognisant of multilateral, bilateral and national sensitivities. Third, given the constantly changing strategic environment, the FPDA should continually develop and evolve to remain relevant as a security arrangement.

At the 10th FPDA Defence Ministers’ Meeting in 2017, the founding principles were contemporised to the ‘3Rs’. The 3Rs complement the founding principles and together they continue to guide the FPDA decision making and activity.

First, the FPDA should not deviate from its Remit in contributing to the external defence of Malaysia and Singapore. Second, the FPDA should develop and evolve to ensure its Relevance as a regional security arrangement at a pace comfortable to all. Third, the FPDA should maintain its purpose and portrayal as a defensive arrangement to provide Reassurance to the region.

== History ==
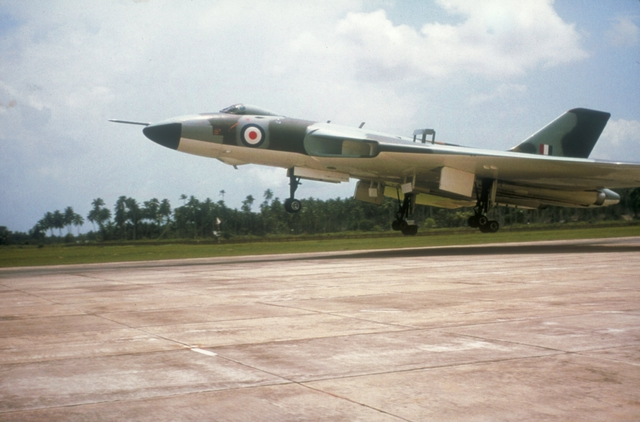
An Avro Vulcan strategic bomber of the Royal Air Force at RMAF Butterworth.

The FPDA was set up following the termination of the United Kingdom's defence guarantees of Malaya under the Anglo-Malayan Defence Agreement, as a result of the UK's decision in 1967 to withdraw its armed forces east of Suez on 1 November 1971. Under the Five Powers Defence Arrangements, the five member-nations of Australia, Malaysia, New Zealand, Singapore and the United Kingdom agreed to consult one another in the event of armed aggression against Malaysia and Singapore. The 1971 Joint Communiqué states:

In the event of any form of armed attack externally organised or supported or the threat of such attack against Malaysia and Singapore, their governments would immediately consult together for the purpose of deciding what measures should be taken jointly or separately in relation to such attack or threat.

In line with the FPDA Joint Communiqué of 16 April 1971, two councils, the Joint Consultative Council and the Air Defence Council, were established. The Joint Consultative Council provided a forum for regular consultations at the senior official-level on matters relating to the defence arrangements. The Air Defence Council was responsible for the functioning of the Headquarters Integrated Air Defence System (HQIADS).

With the expansion and complexity of FPDA exercises and the move towards joint and combined exercises over the years, the two councils were amalgamated in terms of their functions and tasks as well as memberships to improve the management and coordination of FPDA activities. The merged Council was named the FPDA Consultative Council (FCC).

=== Air defence ===
During the early years of FPDA, the arrangements were focused on the air defence of Malaysia and Singapore. Commander IADS held the responsibility and authority for operational air defence. By 1990, Malaysia and Singapore’s military capacity progressed, and the FPDA’s focus shifted towards training and support.

The FPDA based at RMAF Butterworth under the command of an Australian Air Vice-Marshal (2-star). RMAF Butterworth, was under the control of the Royal Australian Air Force until 1988, and is now run by the Royal Malaysian Air Force but hosts rotating detachments of aircraft and personnel from all five countries.

=== Area defence system ===
In 1981, the five powers organised the first annual land and naval exercises. Since 1997, the naval and air exercises have been combined.

In the 1990s, land exercises were added to the exercise programme and by 2000 the FPDA was actively pursuing the development of a capability for joint and combined operations in which air defence would contribute only as part of broader air, land, and maritime operations.

In 2001, HQ IADS was redesignated Headquarters Integrated "Area" Defence System. It now has personnel from all three branches of the armed services, and co-ordinates the annual five-power naval and air exercises, while moving towards the fuller integration of land elements. An annual FPDA Defence Chiefs' Conference (FDCC) is hosted by either Malaysia or Singapore, and is the highest military professional forum of the FPDA and serves as an important platform for dialogue and exchange of views among the Defence Chiefs. There is also a Five Powers Defence Arrangements Ministerial Meeting (FDMM).

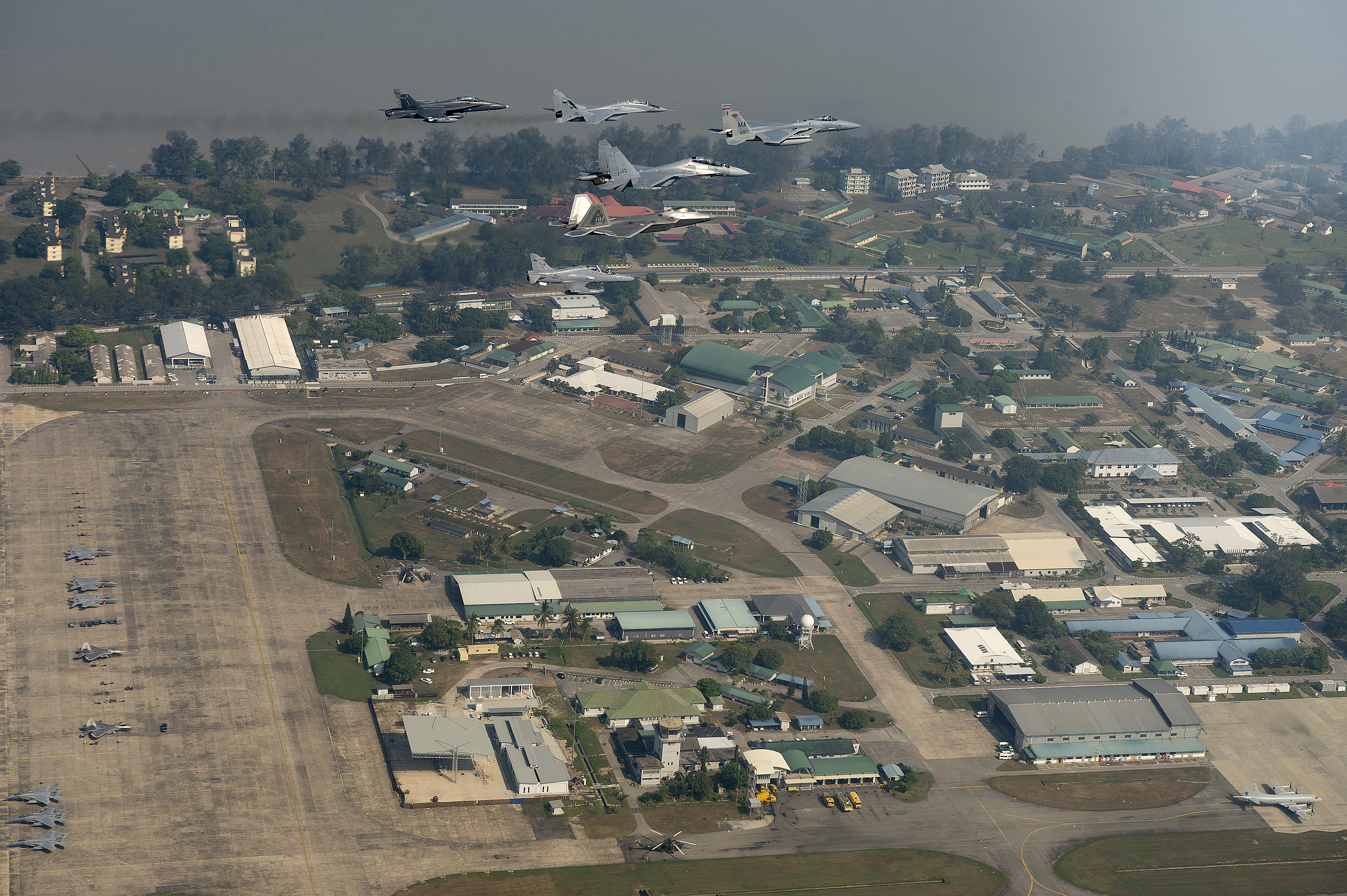
RMAF Butterworth in Penang, Malaysia.

John Moore, then Minister of Defence of Australia said, "As an established multilateral security framework, the FPDA has a unique role in Asia. It is of strategic benefit to all member nations and, in Australia's view, to the wider Asia-Pacific region." Malaysia's CDF, former General (GEN) Tan Sri Dato' Sri Zulkifeli Bin Mohd Zin concurred: "We can help each other... and cooperate with one another."

In the June 2016 New Zealand defence White Paper, it was outlined that given New Zealand was a longstanding member of the Five Power Defence Arrangements, it would, "meet its commitments should Malaysia or Singapore be subject to a military attack."

=== 40th anniversary ===
On 1 November 2011, Singapore hosted FPDA's 40th anniversary celebrations, with the defence ministers, aircraft and servicemen from all five signatory countries converging on Changi Air Base (East) to participate in the event. Later, a gala dinner was hosted by Singaporean Defence Minister Ng Eng Hen at Singapore's Istana whereupon they called on Prime Minister of Singapore Lee Hsien Loong to discuss a multitude of issues. Codenamed Exercise Bersama Lima, the three days joint exercise tested the readiness and co-operation between all participating countries and concluded on 4 November 2011.

=== 50th anniversary ===
On 18 October 2021, FPDA celebrated its 50th anniversary with joint air and naval displays involving the ships and aircraft of the member countries. These were observed by Singaporean Defence Minister Ng Eng Hen and the High Commissioners of Australia, Malaysia, New Zealand and the United Kingdom. Prior to this, a two-week joint exercise had taken place, known as Exercise Bersama Gold in honour of the FPDA's golden jubilee. It was the first FPDA exercise held since the start of the COVID-19 pandemic and involved 2,600 military personnel, air and maritime sea training exercises, and a virtual jungle warfare workshop. Participating ships included the Australian amphibious assault ship HMAS Canberra and New Zealand's HMNZS Aotearoa replenishment tanker. The British destroyer HMS Diamond also took part in the exercise but missed the final days due to technical issues. Whilst in the region at the time, HMS Queen Elizabeth did not participate in the exercise, likely due to the presence of United States Marine Corps on the aircraft carrier.

=== 50 years and beyond ===
The five member-nations continue to contribute to combined and joint exercises, and training opportunities that focus on high-end conventional warfighting, while also being flexible in responding to the changing security landscape. This includes expanding maritime security, counter-terrorism, HADR, and non-combatant evacuation operations.

Additionally, new and emerging capabilities will become more prevalent over the next decade, such as cybersecurity and unmanned aircraft systems. Progress on developing capacity in these areas will continue to be made.

=== FPDA website ===
Minister for Defence Dr Ng Eng Hen hosted the 12th FPDA Defence Ministers' Meeting [FDMM] in Singapore on 31 May 2024. The meeting was attended by Australian Deputy Prime Minister and Defence Minister Richard Marles, Malaysian Defence Minister Dato' Seri Mohamed Khaled Nordin, New Zealand Defence Minister Judith Collins KC, and the United Kingdom's Director General (Security Policy) Paul Wyatt.

The official FPDA website, https://www.fivepowerdefencearrangements.org/ was also launched on the FDMM, that seeks to give additional insight to the public on how the FPDA functions as a defensive arrangement aimed at building trust and confidence in the region.

The FPDA Website serves to promote the FPDA as an authoritative source on its history, supporting the guiding principles of; Remit; Relevance; and Reassurance. It seeks to demonstrate the FPDA’s relevance as a security arrangement, with accurate information.

== Personnel and facilities ==
=== Australia ===
Australia maintains the following personnel and facilities at RMAF Butterworth in Malaysia:

- No. 19 Squadron (19SQN) – A ground support squadron.
- No. 92 Wing Detachment Alpha (92WG Det A) with Boeing P-8 Poseidon
- 2nd/30th Training Group, Australian Army
- Australian Defence Force Investigative Service (Joint Investigation Office Butterworth)
- Joint Health Command (Butterworth Clinic)
- Land Command Liaison Section, Australian Army (as at May 2007)
- Rifle Company Butterworth, Australian Army

=== United Kingdom ===
The United Kingdom has the following personnel and facilities based in Malaysia and Singapore in support of the FPDA:

- British Defence Singapore Support Unit – A naval support facility at Sembawang in Singapore operated by Strategic Command (previously Joint Forces Command) Staff at Sembawang total three Ministry of Defence civil servants, one Chief Petty Officer and one Petty officer (RN). The present UK Defence Adviser to Singapore as of 2015 is a Royal Navy Commander. In May 2021, the Royal Navy announced that two River-class offshore patrol vessels, HMS Tamar and HMS Spey, would be permanently based in the Indo-Pacific region. As of 2026, the ships use the BDSSU as their primary logistics hub.
- Staff in the Integrated Area Defence System Headquarters (HQ IADS) at RMAF Butterworth in Penang, Malaysia consisting of one Wing Commander, one Squadron Leader, one Lieutenant Commander, one Major and one Flight Sergeant.

== Exercises ==
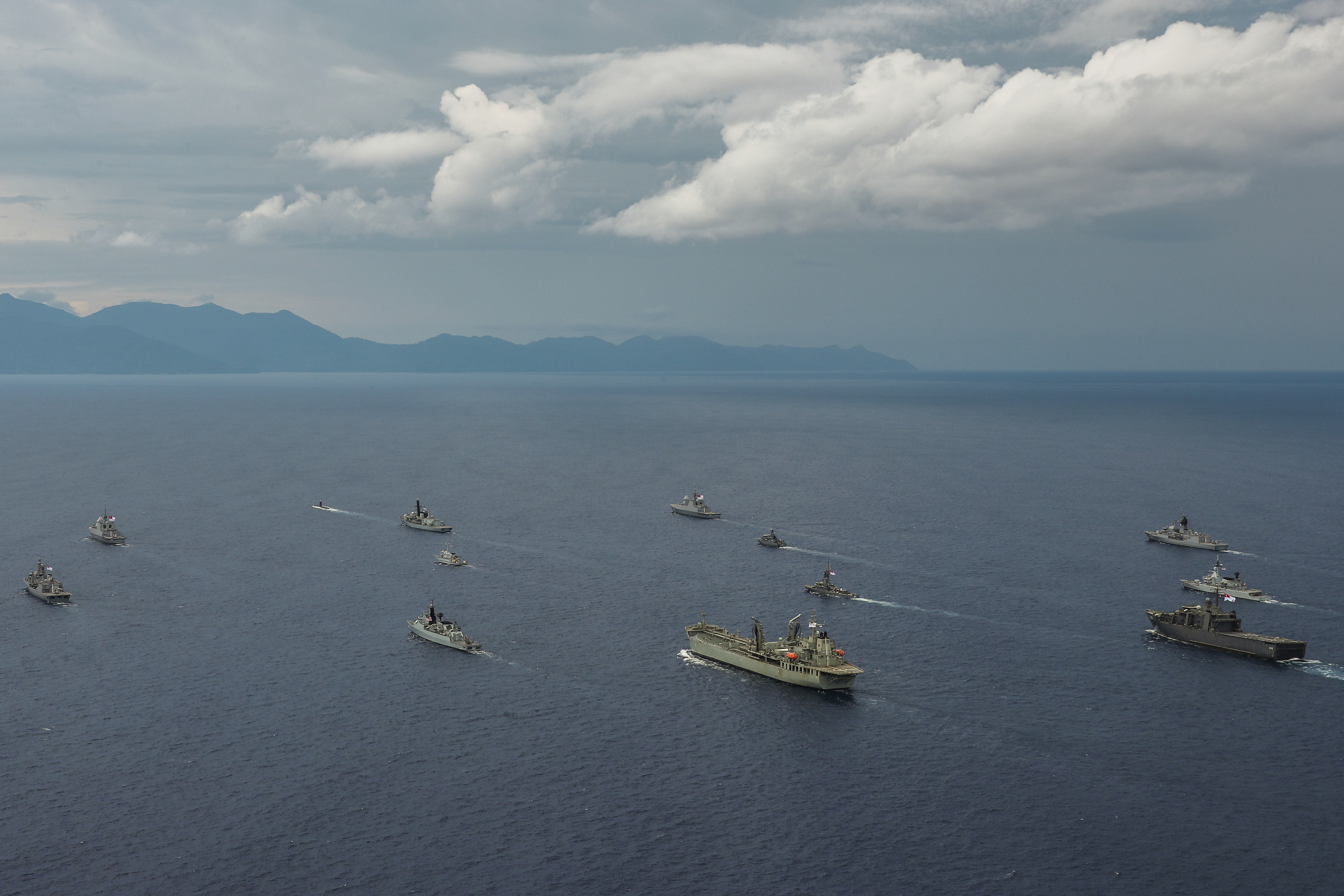
18 FPDA warships in formation for Exercise Bersama Lima 18 in 2018.

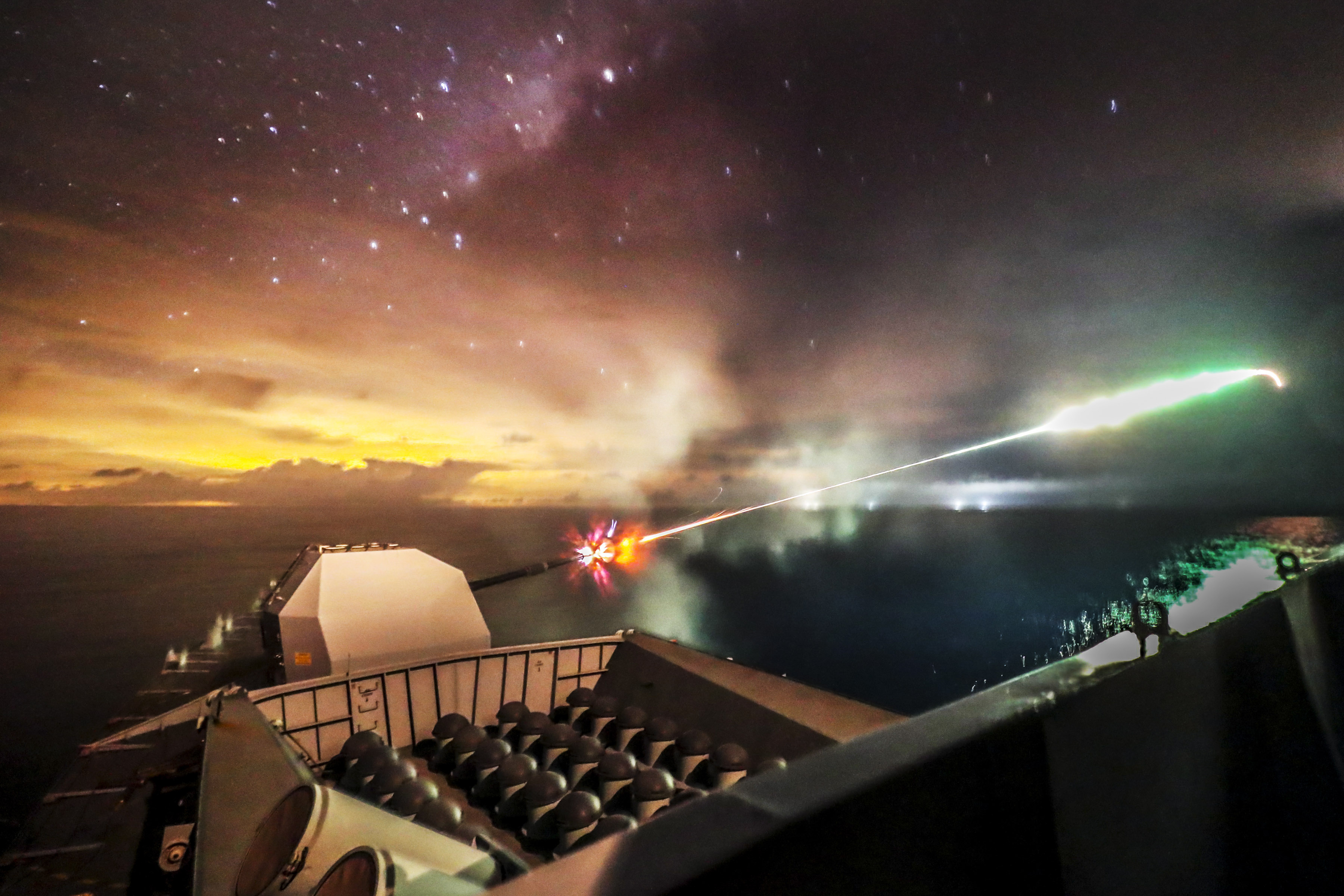
HMS Argyll firing her 4.5-inch Mark 8 naval gun during Exercise Bersama Lima in 2018.

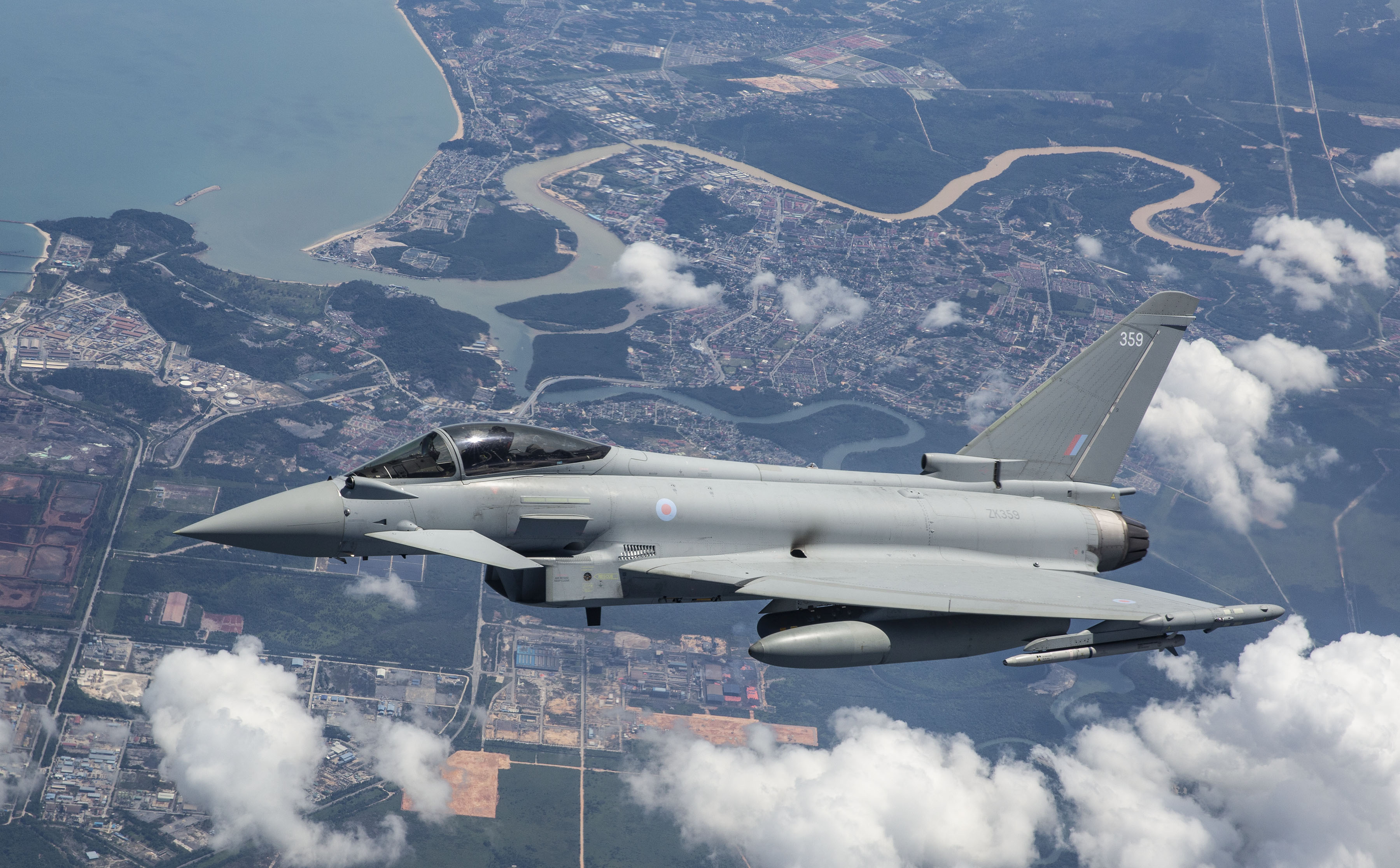
RAF Typhoon aircraft on Exercise Bersama Lima 2019 at RMAF Butterworth.

Since its formation, the FPDA has conducted multilateral military exercises involving all five member states with operational command alternating between Singapore and Malaysia. These began as intermittent Air Defence Exercises (ADEX) in the 1970s before land and sea components were added in the 1980s. They have since become yearly fixtures and have grown in complexity, combining air, sea and land components to address both conventional and non-conventional threats. Whilst most exercises take place off the coast of Malaysia and Singapore, they have also extended into the South China Sea. Non-FPDA representatives are often invited to observe the drills.

FPDA exercises focus on the external defence of Malaysia and Singapore, and high-end conventional warfighting serials. Over a five-year cycle, the FPDA conducts a variety of field training exercises (FTX) and command post exercises (CPX).

Examples of FPDA exercises include:

- Exercise Bersatu Lima – The first major exercise held in 1972.
- Exercise Platypus – The first land-based FPDA exercise which was held in Australia in 1981.
- Exercise Starfish – One of the first FPDA naval exercises, inaugurated in 1981. It has been replaced by Exercise Bersama Lima.
- Exercise Flying Fish – The first combined air, sea and land exercise which was first held in 1997. With 39 warships and 160 combat aircraft, the inaugural exercise in 1997 was one of the largest to date and took place over 13 days.
- Exercise Bersama Padu – The name of this exercise translates to "Together United" in Malay. The inaugural exercise in 2006 took place in Singapore and the South China Sea and consisted of 21 warships, 85 aircraft and 1 submarine as well as ground components. Operational planning took place at Paya Lebar Air Base, Singapore.
- Exercise Suman Warrior – A land-based exercise which originated in the 1990s and takes place in Australia and New Zealand. SUMAN WARRIOR is an annual land-based CPX solely to exercise FPDA land forces up to Brigade level. This exercise is unique in that it is hosted by each of the five nations and is the only FPDA exercise to occur outside of Singapore and Malaysia.

The name SUMAN is an acronym from the first letters of the five nations; the exercise has occurred since 1990.

- Exercise Suman Protector – Inaugurated in 2007, it is held every five years as a culminating activity in the FPDA's exercise cycle. SUMAN PROTECTOR occurs every 5 years and is the culminating activity in the exercise programme. Hosted by Malaysia or Singapore, it is a Tier 3 operational CPX designed to exercise an FPDA Combined and Joint Task Force headquarters to plan for and execute a military operation for the defence of Malaysia and Singapore against a conventional threat. Up to 400 personnel are involved at the headquarters, and the exercise also allows deeper engagement with other government agencies and non-governmental organisations.
- Exercise Bersama Shield – Formerly the Integrated Air Defence System air defence exercise until 2004. BERSAMA SHIELD is a tactical integration exercise for FPDA air and maritime forces at the tactical-level. Hosted by HQIADS, the exercise occurs annually in Malaysia and Singapore, and routinely involves over 50 aircraft, 3-6 ships and several ground-based air defence units. The exercise has been held annually since 2004, evolving from earlier FPDA exercise iterations such as STARDEX, FLYING FISH, and STARFISH.
- Exercise Bersama Lima – Translates to "Together Five" in Malay. These exercises were inaugurated in 2004 and have taken place on a yearly basis ever since. BERSAMA LIMA is a tactical-level exercise with an operational-level headquarters aimed at exercising FPDA combined and joint forces, including a land element. It is planned and led by the Malaysian Armed Forces or Singapore Armed Forces in alternate years. In addition to augmentation at the Combined and Joint HQ, BERSAMA LIMA routinely sees 60-80 aircraft, 10-15 ships, 1-2 submarines and a Land Component.
- Exercise Bersama Gold – A replacement of Exercise Bersama Lima to mark the FPDA's golden jubilee in October 2021.
