= Al-Jaish =

Al Jaish (Arabic: الجيش, lit. 'army') may refer to:

- Tala'ea El Gaish SC, a football club in Cairo, Egypt
- Al-Jaish SC (Iraq), a sports club in Baghdad, Iraq
- Al-Jaish SC (Syria), a sports club in Damascus, Syria
- El Jaish SC, a former sports club that represented the Qatar Armed Forces
  - El Jaish SC (handball)
  - El Jaish SC (volleyball)

== See also ==
- Army
- Lists of armies
