= XIX Corps =

XIX Corps, 19th Corps, XIX Army Corps, or 19th Army Corps may refer to:

== Germany ==
- XIX (2nd Royal Saxon) Corps, Imperial German Army, prior to and during World War I
- XIX Army Corps (Wehrmacht)
- XIX Mountain Corps, Wehrmacht

== Russia and Soviet Union ==
=== Russian Empire ===
- 19th Army Corps (Russian Empire)

=== Soviet Union ===
- 19th Rifle Corps
- 19th Tank Corps

== United Kingdom ==
- XIX Corps (United Kingdom)

=== Artillery Volunteer Corps ===
- 19th (Manchester) Lancashire Artillery Volunteer Corps

=== Rifle Volunteer Corps ===
- 19th (Stockport) Cheshire Rifle Volunteer Corps
- 19th (Liverpool Lowland Scottish) Lancashire Rifle Volunteer Corps
- 19th (Liverpool Press Guard) Lancashire Rifle Volunteer Corps
- 19th (Gainsborough) Lincolnshire Rifle Volunteer Corps
- 19th Middlesex Rifle Volunteer Corps
- 19th (St Giles and St George's, Bloomsbury) Middlesex Rifle Volunteer Corps
- 19th (Lambeth) Surrey Rifle Volunteer Corps
- 19th (Eastbourne) Sussex Rifle Volunteer Corps
- 19th (Rotherham) Yorkshire West Riding Rifle Volunteer Corps

== United States ==
- XIX Corps (United States)
- XIX Corps (Union Army)

== Other countries ==
- 19th Army Corps (France)
- XIX Army Corps (Italy)
- XIX Corps (Ottoman Empire)
- XIX Army Corps (Spain)
- 19th Army Corps (Ukraine)

== See also ==
- List of military corps by number
- 19th Army (disambiguation)
- 19th Division (disambiguation)
- 19th Brigade (disambiguation)
- 19th Regiment (disambiguation)
- 19th Group (disambiguation)
- 19th Battalion (disambiguation)
- 19th Squadron (disambiguation)
- 19th (disambiguation)
