= 19th Mechanised Brigade =

19th Mechanised Brigade may refer to:

- 19th Mechanized Brigade (Soviet Union, 1934-1938)
- 19th Guards Mechanized Brigade, Soviet Union and later Belarus
- Norrbotten Brigade, also known as the 19th Arctic Mechanised Brigade, Sweden

== See also ==
- 19th Brigade (disambiguation)
