= NS19 =

NS19, NS 19, NS-19, NS.19, or variation, may refer to:

== Places ==
- Toa Payoh MRT station (station code: NS19), Toa Payoh, Singapore; a mass transit station
- Dartmouth South (constituency N.S. 19), Nova Scotia, Canada; a provincial electoral district
- Wanica District (FIPS region code NS19), Suriname

== Other uses ==
- New Penguin Shakespeare volume 19
- Blue Origin NS-19, a suborbital space tourism flight in December 2021

== See also ==
- NS (disambiguation)
- 19 (disambiguation)
