= 19th Infantry =

19th Infantry may refer to:

- 19th Infantry Division (disambiguation)
- 19th Infantry Brigade (disambiguation)
- 19th Infantry Regiment (disambiguation)

== See also ==
- 19th (disambiguation)
