= 19th Group =

19th Group may refer to:

- 19th Air Refueling Group, a unit of the United States Air Force
- 19th Special Forces Group, a unit of the United States Army

== See also ==
- 19th Corps (disambiguation)
- 19th Division (disambiguation)
- 19th Brigade (disambiguation)
- 19th Regiment (disambiguation)
- 19th Battalion (disambiguation)
- 19th Squadron (disambiguation)
