= Army =

Military branch for ground warfare

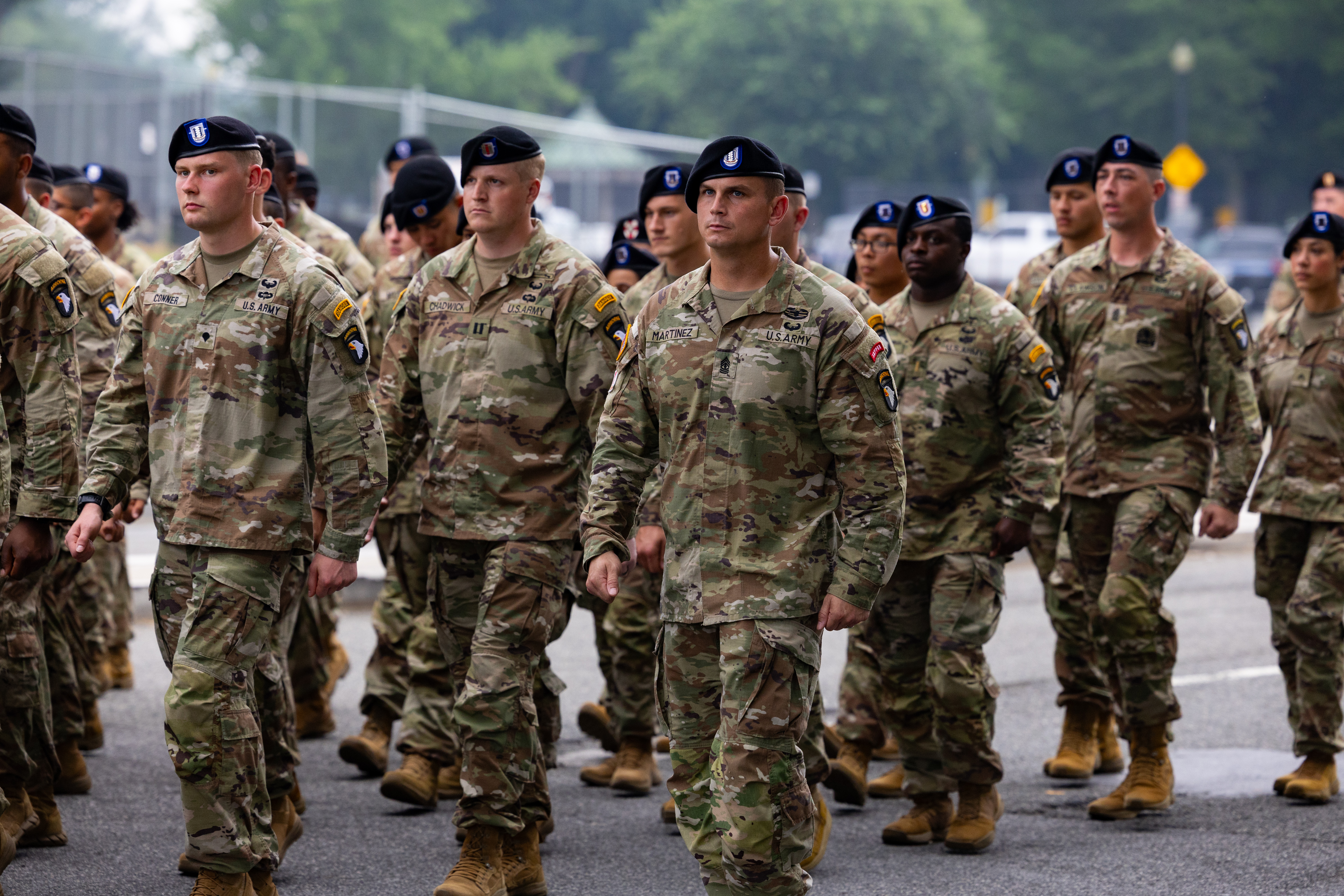
United States Army soldiers at a 2025 parade

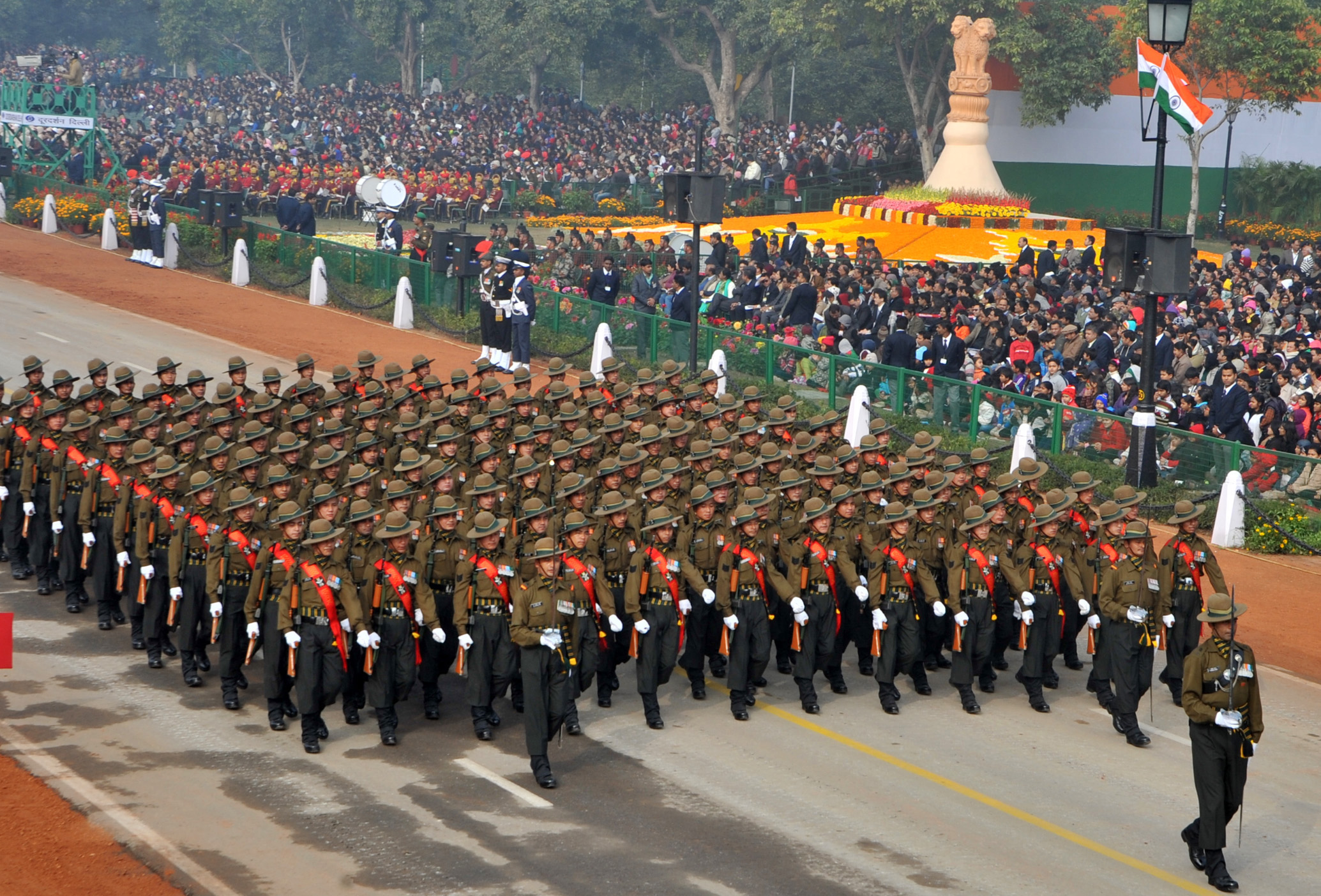
Indian Army soldiers on parade in 2014

An army, ground force or land force is an armed force that fights primarily on land. In the broadest sense, it is the land-based military branch, service branch, or armed service of a nation or country. It may also include aviation assets by possessing an army aviation component. Within a national military force, the word army may also mean a field army.

== Definition ==
In some countries, such as France and China, the term "army", especially in its plural form "armies", has the broader meaning of armed forces as a whole, while retaining the colloquial sense of land forces. To differentiate the colloquial army from the formal concept of military force, the term is qualified, for example, in France, the land force is called Armée de terre, meaning Land Army, and the air and space force is called Armée de l'Air et de l’Espace, meaning Air and Space Army. The naval force, although not using the term "army", is also included in the broad sense of the term "armies" — thus the French Navy is an integral component of the collective French Armies (French Armed Forces) under the Ministry of the Armies. A similar pattern is seen in China, with the People's Liberation Army (PLA) being the overall military, the land force being the PLA Ground Force, and so forth for the PLA Air Force, the PLA Navy, and other branches.

Though by convention, irregular military is understood in contrast to regular armies, which grew slowly from personal bodyguards or elite militia. Regular, in this case, refers to standardized doctrines, uniforms, organizations, etc. Regular military can also refer to full-time status (standing army), versus reserve or part-time personnel. Other distinctions may separate statutory forces (established under laws such as the National Defence Act) from de facto "non-statutory" forces such as some guerrilla and revolutionary armies.

== Structure ==
Armies are always divided into various specialties, according to the mission, role, and training of individual units, and sometimes individual soldiers within a unit.

Some of the groupings common to all armies include the following:

- Infantry
- Armoured corps
- Artillery corps
- Signal corps
- Special forces
- Military police
- Medical corps

== History ==
=== Egypt ===
Ancient Egypt established one of the first professional standing armies in the world. Egypt's Old Kingdom (2700–2200 BCE) was one of the golden eras of the Egyptian history. Because of this affluence, it allowed the government to stabilize and in turn organize a functioning military. During this period, most military conflict was limited to the consolidation of power within Egypt and defending Egypt's territories. The Egyptian military transitioned into a permanent, professional fighting force during the Middle and New Kingdoms (circa 2000–1500 BCE), allowing the pharaohs to build a massive empire. During the reign of Amenemhat I and Ramesses II, the Egyptian military became the first to utilize specialized divisions, standardized weaponry, and war chariots. It was used to secure trade routes and build a vast empire in the Middle East and Africa.

=== India ===
During the Iron Age, the Maurya and Nanda Empires had one of the largest armies in the world, the peak being approximately over 600,000 Infantry, 30,000 Cavalry, 8,000 War-Chariots and 9,000 War Elephants not including tributary state allies. In the Gupta age, large armies of longbowmen were recruited to fight off invading horse archer armies. Elephants, pikemen, and cavalry were other featured troops.

=== China ===
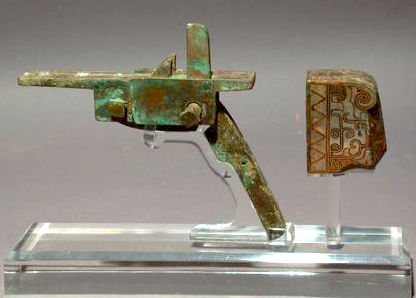
A bronze crossbow trigger mechanism and butt plate that were mass-produced in the Warring States period (475–221 BCE)

The states of China raised armies for at least 1000 years before the Spring and Autumn Annals. By the Warring States period, the crossbow had been perfected enough to become a military secret, with bronze bolts that could pierce any armor. Thus, any political power of a state rested on the army and its organization. China underwent political consolidation of the states of Han (韓), Wei (魏), Chu (楚), Yan (燕), Zhao (趙) and Qi (齊), until by 221 BCE, Qin Shi Huang (秦始皇帝), the first emperor of the Qin dynasty, attained absolute power. The first emperor of China could command the creation of a Terracotta Army to guard his tomb in the city of Xi'an (西安). In addition to a realignment of the Great Wall of China to strengthen his empire against insurrection, invasion, and incursion.

Sun Tzu's The Art of War remains one of China's Seven Military Classics, even though it is two thousand years old. Since no political figure could exist without an army, measures were taken to ensure only the most capable leaders could control the armies. Civil bureaucracies (士大夫) arose to control the productive power of the states, and their military power.

=== Ancient Greece ===
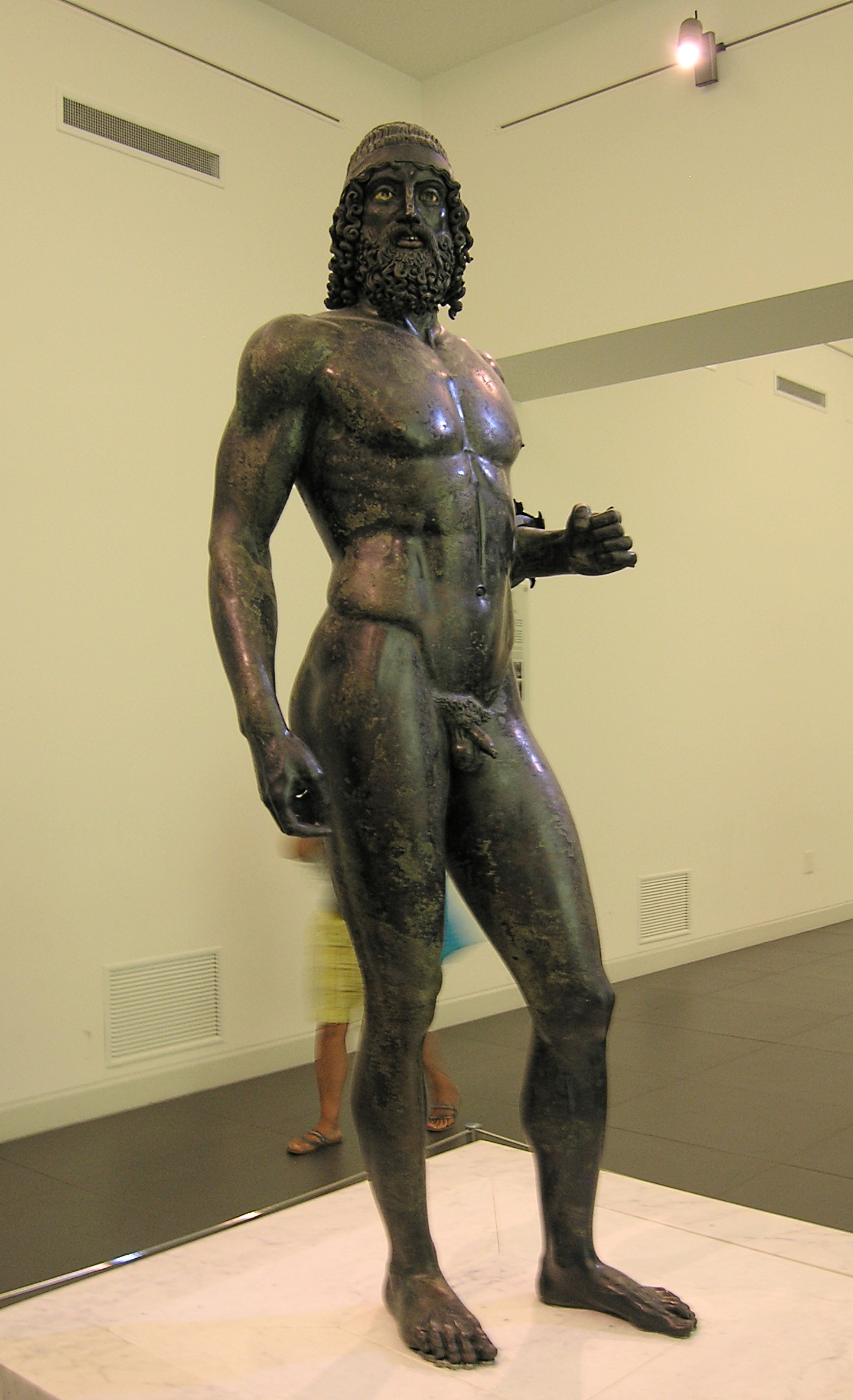
An Ancient Greek warrior in bronze, Riace bronzes, c. 450 BCE.

In ancient Greece, the armies of the city-states generally consisted of citizen militias. Sparta was notable for the extent to which its society and army were organized around military service and preparedness. Spartan citizens underwent military training and were subject to military obligations, while the army also included perioikoi, helots, and allied contingents. The city-state of Athens raised a professional cavalry force in the 440s BC which by the late 430s BC comprised 1,000 Hippeis (heavy cavalry) and 200 horse archers. From 421 to 418 BC, the city-state of Argos maintained a standing force of 1,000 hoplites, and in 378 BC the city-state of Thebes raised the Sacred Band of Thebes, a standing force of 300 elite hoplites which existed until 338 BC. Philip II of Macedon, who reigned from 359 to 336 BC, transformed the ancient Macedonian army into a standing force with its troops being paid year-round. This army would under Philip's son Alexander the Great go on to participate in numerous conquests.

=== Ancient Rome ===
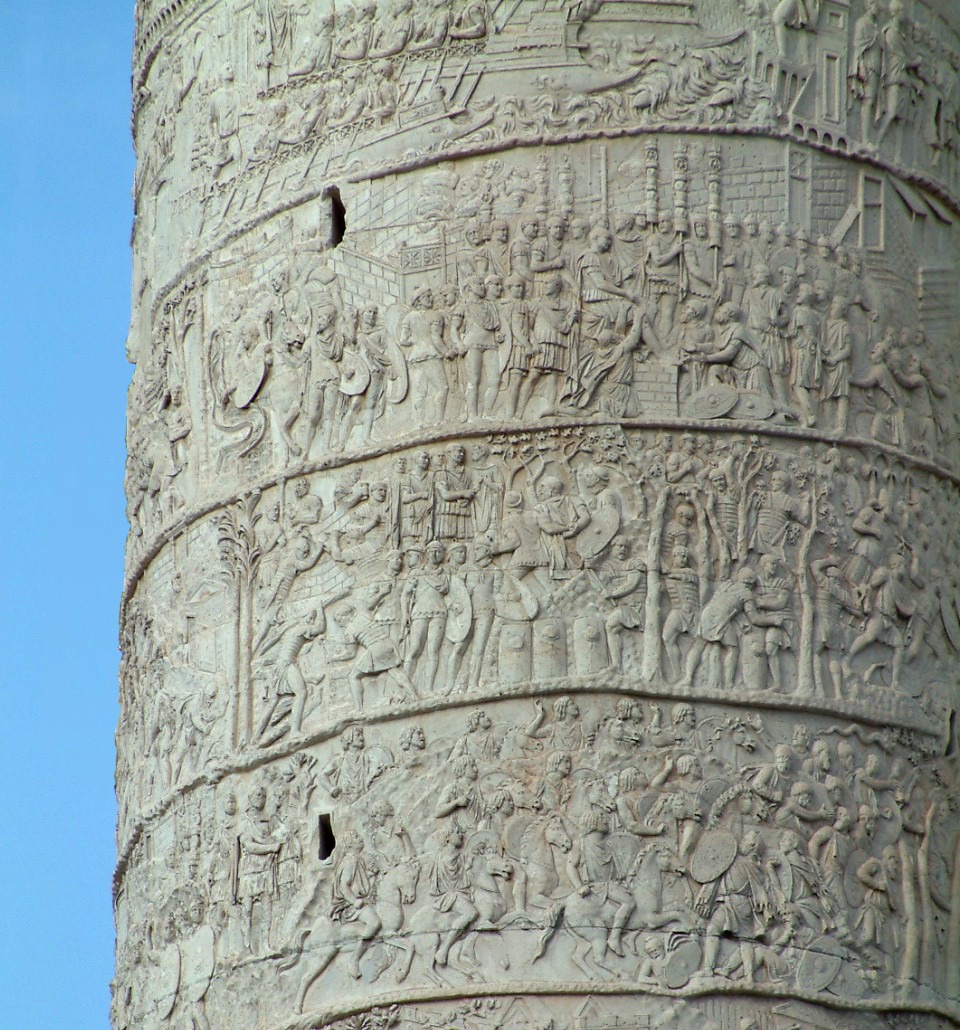
A 2nd-century depiction of Roman soldiers on Trajan's Column

The Roman Army had its origins in the citizen army of the Republic, which was staffed by citizens serving mandatory duty for Rome. Conscription remained the main method through which Rome mustered forces until the end of the Republic. The army eventually became a professional organization largely of citizens, who would served continuously for 25 years before being discharged.

The Romans were also noted for making use of auxiliary troops, non-Romans who served with the legions and filled roles that the traditional Roman military could not fill effectively, such as light skirmish troops and heavy cavalry. After their service in the army they were made citizens of Rome and then their children were citizens also. They were also given land and money to settle in Rome. In the Late Roman Empire, these auxiliary troops, along with foreign mercenaries, became the core of the Roman Army; moreover, by the time of the Late Roman Empire tribes such as the Visigoths were paid to serve as mercenaries.

=== Medieval Europe ===
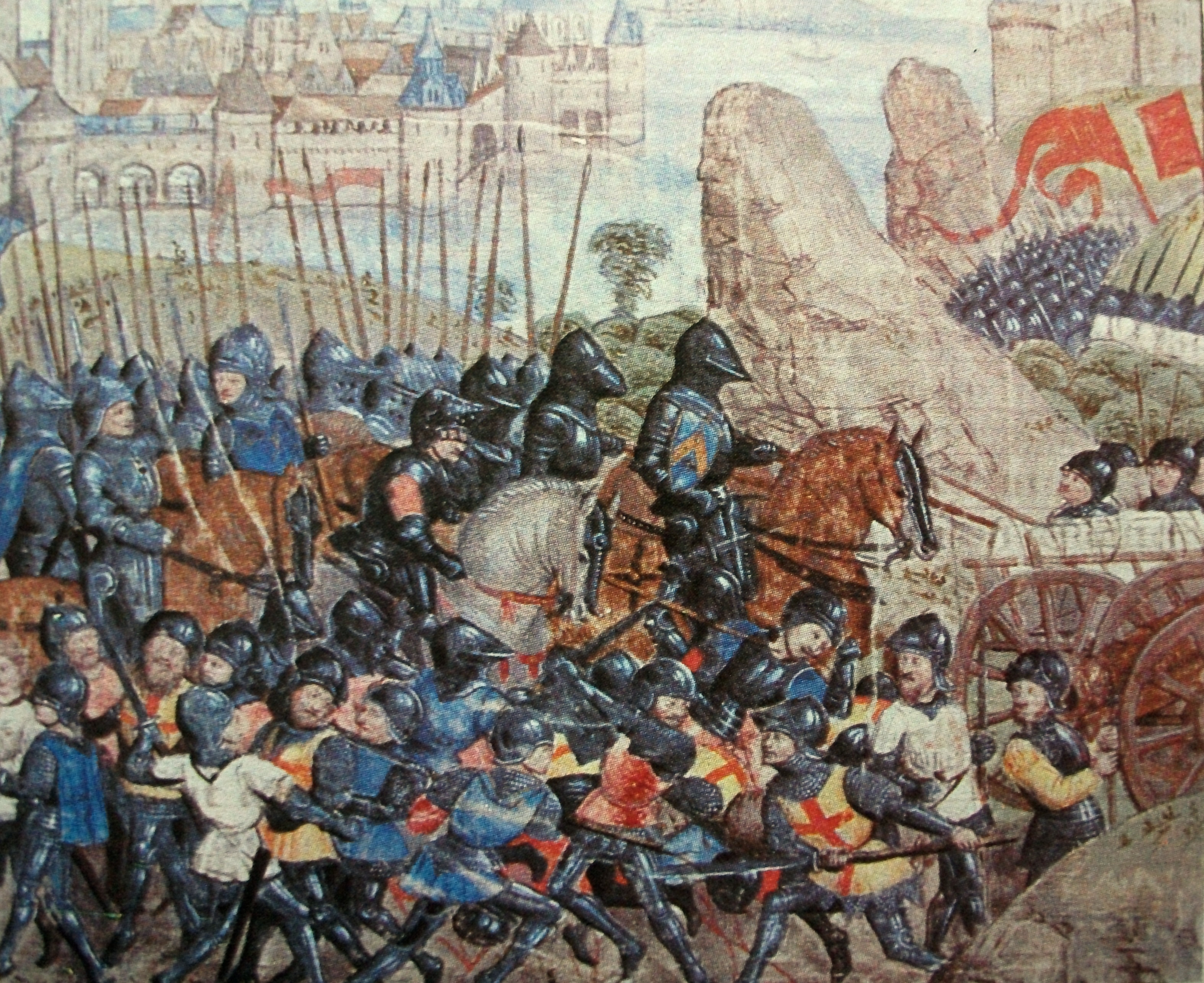
Armies of the Middle Ages consisted of noble knights, rendering service to their suzerain, and hired footsoldiers

In the earliest Middle Ages it was the obligation of every aristocrat to respond to the call to battle with his own equipment, archers, and infantry. This decentralized system was necessary due to the social order of the time, but could lead to motley forces with variable training, equipment and abilities. The more resources the noble had access to, the better his troops would be.

Initially, the words "knight" and "noble" were used interchangeably as there was not generally a distinction between them. While the nobility did fight upon horseback, they were also supported by lower class citizens – and mercenaries and criminals – whose only purpose was participating in warfare because, most often than not, they held brief employment during their lord's engagement. As the Middle Ages progressed and feudalism developed in a legitimate social and economic system, knights started to develop into their own class with a minor caveat: they were still in debt to their lord. No longer primarily driven by economic need, the newly established vassal class were, instead, driven by fealty and chivalry.

As central governments grew in power, a return to the citizen armies of the classical period also began, as central levies of the peasantry began to be the central recruiting tool. England was one of the most centralized states in the Middle Ages, and the armies that fought in the Hundred Years' War were, predominantly, composed of paid professionals.

In theory, every Englishman had an obligation to serve for 40 days. Forty days was not long enough for a campaign, especially one on the continent.

Thus the scutage was introduced, whereby most Englishmen paid to escape their service and this money was used to create a permanent army. However, almost all high medieval armies in Europe were composed of a great deal of paid core troops, and there was a large mercenary market in Europe from at least the early 12th century.

As the Middle Ages progressed in Italy, Italian cities began to rely mostly on mercenaries to do their fighting rather than the militias that had dominated the early and high medieval period in this region. These would be groups of career soldiers who would be paid a set rate. Mercenaries tended to be effective soldiers, especially in combination with standing forces, but in Italy they came to dominate the armies of the city states. This made them considerably less reliable than a standing army. Mercenary-on-mercenary warfare in Italy also led to relatively bloodless campaigns which relied as much on maneuver as on battles.

In 1439 the French legislature, known as the Estates General (French: états généraux), passed laws that restricted military recruitment and training to the king alone. There was a new tax to be raised known as the taille that was to provide funding for a new Royal army. The mercenary companies were given a choice of either joining the Royal army as compagnies d'ordonnance on a permanent basis, or being hunted down and destroyed if they refused. France gained a total standing army of around 6,000 men, which was sent out to gradually eliminate the remaining mercenaries who insisted on operating on their own. The new standing army had a more disciplined and professional approach to warfare than its predecessors. The reforms of the 1440s, eventually led to the French victory at Castillon in 1453, and the conclusion of the Hundred Years' War. By 1450 the companies were divided into the field army, known as the grande ordonnance and the garrison force known as the petite ordonnance.

=== Early modern ===
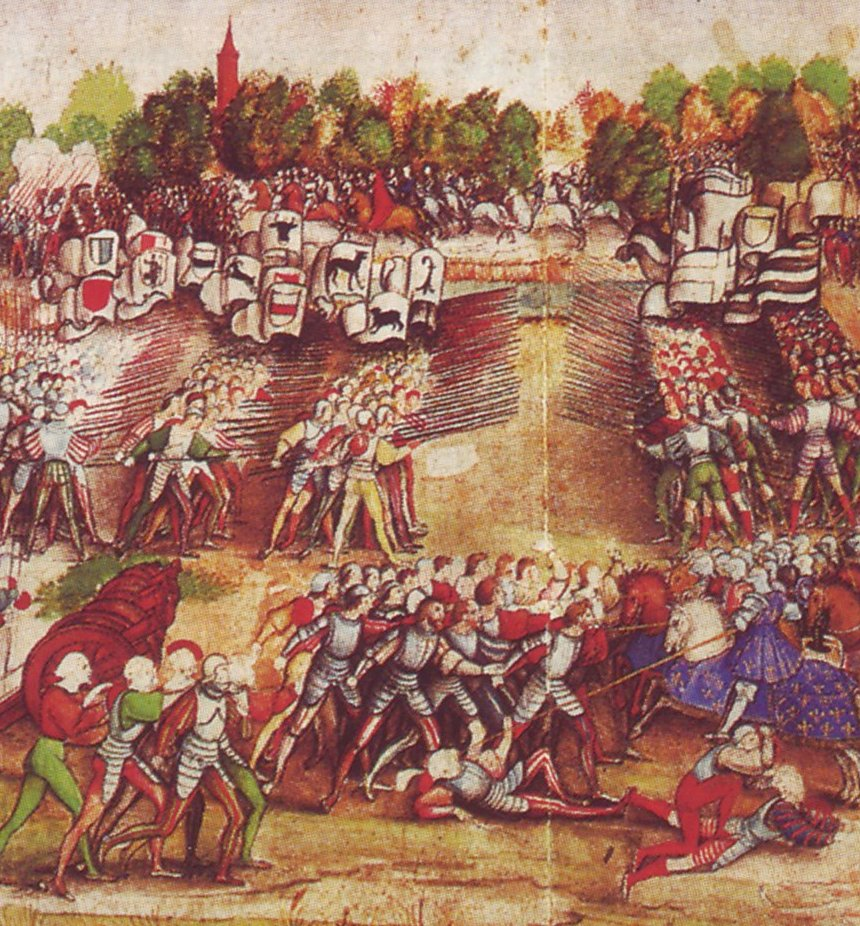
Swiss mercenaries and German Landsknechts fighting for glory, fame and money at the Battle of Marignan (1515). The bulk of the Renaissance armies was composed of mercenaries.

First nation states lacked the funds needed to maintain standing forces, so they tended to hire mercenaries to serve in their armies during wartime. Such mercenaries typically formed at the ends of periods of conflict, when men-at-arms were no longer needed by their respective governments.

The veteran soldiers thus looked for other forms of employment, often becoming mercenaries. Free Companies would often specialize in forms of combat that required longer periods of training that was not available in the form of a mobilized militia.

As late as the 1650s, most troops were mercenaries. However, after the 17th century, most states invested in better disciplined and more politically reliable permanent troops. For a time mercenaries became important as trainers and administrators, but soon these tasks were also taken by the state. The massive size of these armies required a large supporting force of administrators.

The newly centralized states were forced to set up vast organized bureaucracies to manage these armies, which some historians argue is the basis of the modern bureaucratic state. The combination of increased taxes and increased centralization of government functions caused a series of revolts across Europe such as the Fronde in France and the English Civil War.

In many countries, the resolution of this conflict was the rise of absolute monarchy. Only in England and the Netherlands did representative government evolve as an alternative. From the late 17th century, states learned how to finance wars through long term low interest loans from national banking institutions. The first state to master this process was the Dutch Republic. This transformation in the armies of Europe had great social impact. The defense of the state now rested on the commoners, not on the aristocrats. However, aristocrats continued to monopolize the officer corps of almost all early modern armies, including their high command. Moreover, popular revolts almost always failed unless they had the support and patronage of the noble or gentry classes. The new armies, because of their vast expense, were also dependent on taxation and the commercial classes who also began to demand a greater role in society. The great commercial powers of the Dutch and English matched much larger states in military might.

As any man could be quickly trained in the use of a musket, it became far easier to form massive armies. The inaccuracy of the weapons necessitated large groups of massed soldiers. This led to a rapid swelling of the size of armies. For the first time huge masses of the population could enter combat, rather than just the highly skilled professionals.

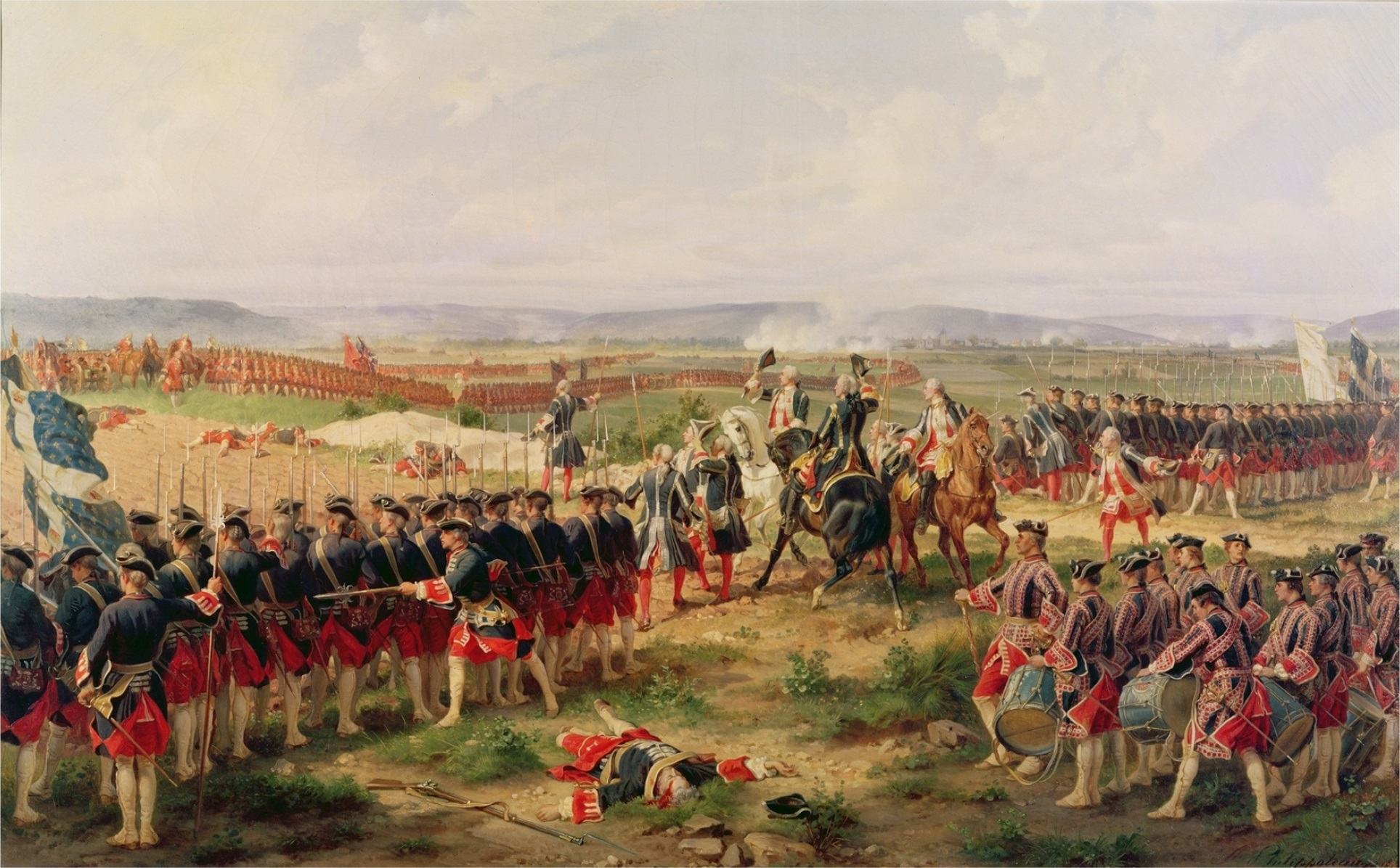
The colonels of the French Guards and British guards politely discussing who should fire first at the Battle of Fontenoy (1745). An example of "lace war".

It has been argued that the drawing of men from across the nation into an organized corps helped breed national unity and patriotism, and during this period the modern notion of the nation state was born. However, this would only become apparent after the French Revolutionary Wars. At this time, the levée en masse and conscription would become the defining paradigm of modern warfare.

Before then, however, most national armies were in fact composed of many nationalities. In Spain armies were recruited from all the Spanish European territories including Spain, Italy, Wallonia (Walloon Guards) and Germany. The French recruited some soldiers from Germany, Switzerland as well as from Piedmont. Britain recruited Hessian and Hanoverian troops until the late 18th century. Irish Catholics made careers for themselves in the armies of many Catholic European states.

Prior to the English Civil War in England, the monarch maintained a personal bodyguard of Yeomen of the Guard and the Honourable Corps of Gentlemen at Arms, or "gentlemen pensioners", and a few locally raised companies to garrison important places such as Berwick on Tweed or Portsmouth (or Calais before it was recaptured by France in 1558).

Troops for foreign expeditions were raised upon an ad hoc basis. Noblemen and professional regular soldiers were commissioned by the monarch to supply troops, raising their quotas by indenture from a variety of sources. On January 26, 1661 Charles II issued the Royal Warrant that created the genesis of what would become the British Army, although the Scots Army and English Army would remain two separate organizations until the unification of England and Scotland in 1707. The small force was represented by only a few regiments.

After the American Revolutionary War the Continental Army was quickly disbanded as part of the Americans' distrust of standing armies, and irregular state militias became the sole ground army of the United States, with the exception of one battery of artillery guarding West Point's arsenal. Then First American Regiment was established in 1784. However, because of continuing conflict with Native Americans, it was soon realized that it was necessary to field a trained standing army. The first of these, the Legion of the United States, was established in 1791.

Until 1733 the common soldiers of Prussian Army consisted largely of peasantry recruited or impressed from Brandenburg–Prussia, leading many to flee to neighboring countries. To halt this trend, Frederick William I divided Prussia into regimental cantons. Every youth was required to serve as a soldier in these recruitment districts for three months each year; this met agrarian needs and added extra troops to bolster the regular ranks.

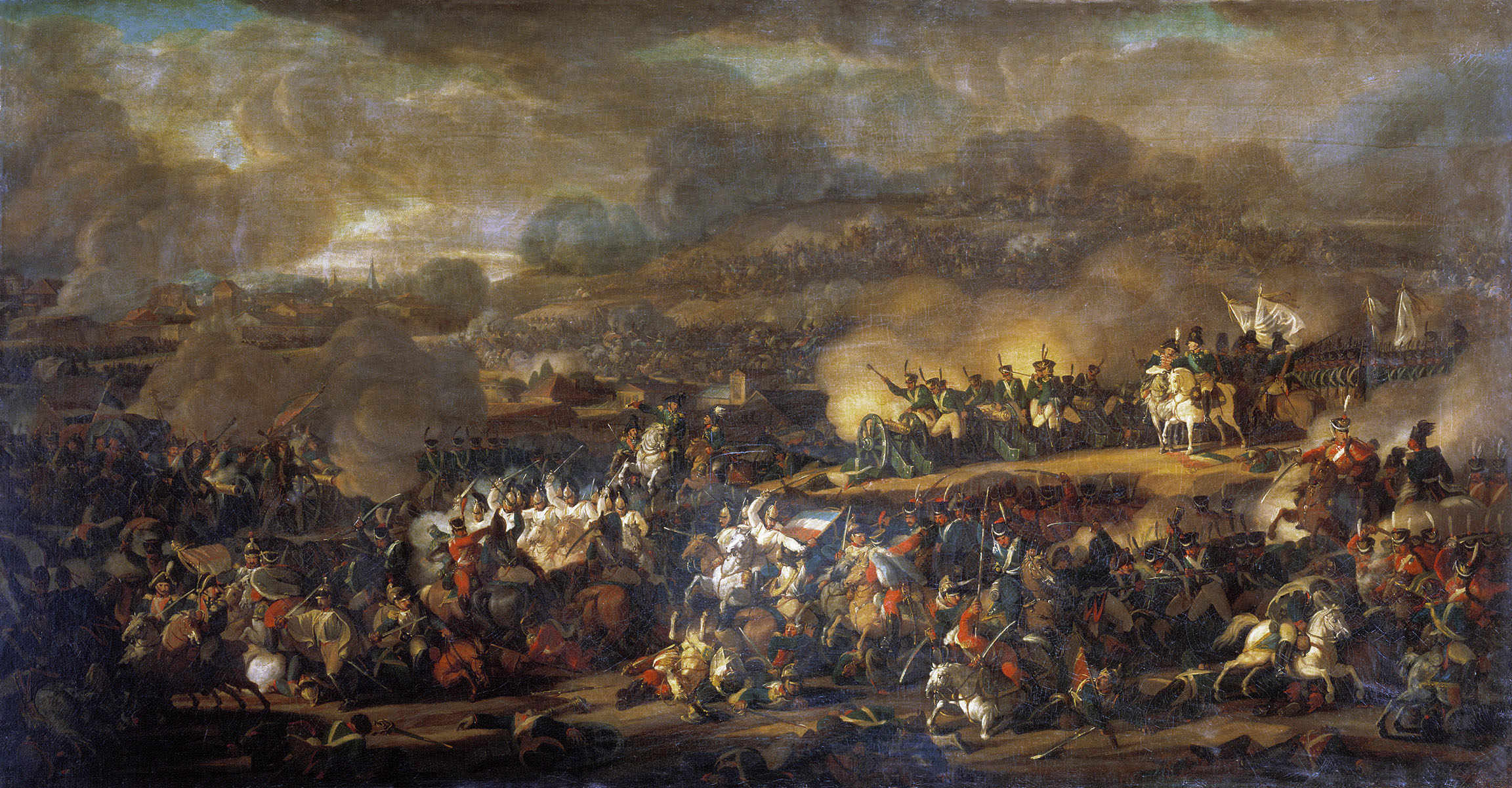
The battle of the Nations (1813), marked the transition between aristocratic armies and national armies. Masses replace hired professionals and national hatred overrides dynastic conflicts. An early example of total wars.

Russian tsars before Peter I of Russia maintained professional hereditary musketeer corps (streltsy in Russian) that were highly unreliable and undisciplined. In times of war the armed forces were augmented by peasants. Peter I introduced a modern regular army built on German model, but with a new aspect: officers not necessarily from nobility, as talented commoners were given promotions that eventually included a noble title at the attainment of an officer's rank. Conscription of peasants and townspeople was based on quota system, per settlement. Initially it was based on the number of households, later it was based on the population numbers. The term of service in the 18th century was for life. In 1793 it was reduced to 25 years. In 1834 it was reduced to 20 years plus 5 years in reserve and in 1855 to 12 years plus 3 years of reserve.

The first Ottoman standing army were Janissaries. They replaced forces that mostly comprised tribal warriors (ghazis) whose loyalty and morale could not always be trusted. The first Janissary units were formed from prisoners of war and slaves, probably as a result of the sultan taking his traditional one-fifth share of his army's treasure they looted in kind rather than cash.

From the 1380s onwards, their ranks were filled under the devşirme system, where feudal dues were paid by service to the sultan. The "recruits" were mostly Christian youths, reminiscent of mamluks.

China organized the Manchu people into the Eight Banner system in the early 17th century. Defected Ming armies formed the Green Standard Army. These troops enlisted voluntarily and for long terms of service.

=== Late modern ===
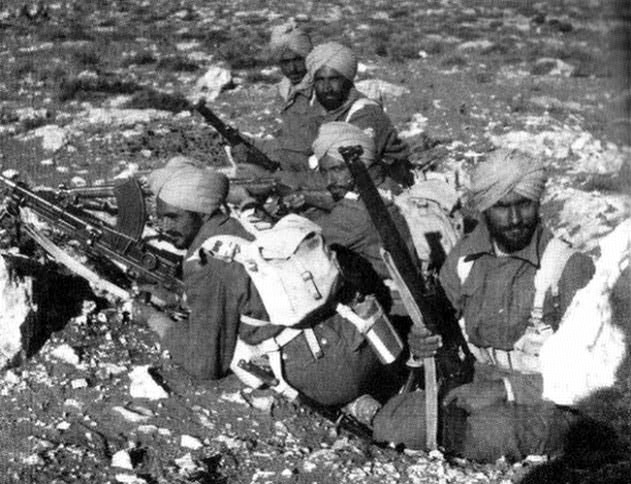
British Indian Army personnel during Operation Crusader in Egypt, 1941

Conscription allowed the French Republic to form the Grande Armée, what Napoleon Bonaparte called "the nation in arms", which successfully battled European professional armies.

Conscription, particularly when the conscripts are being sent to foreign wars that do not directly affect the security of the nation, has historically been highly politically contentious in democracies.

In developed nations, the increasing emphasis on technological firepower and better-trained fighting forces, make mass conscription unlikely in the foreseeable future.

Russia, as well as many other nations, retains mainly a conscript army. There is also a very rare citizen army as used in Switzerland (see Military of Switzerland).

== Field army ==
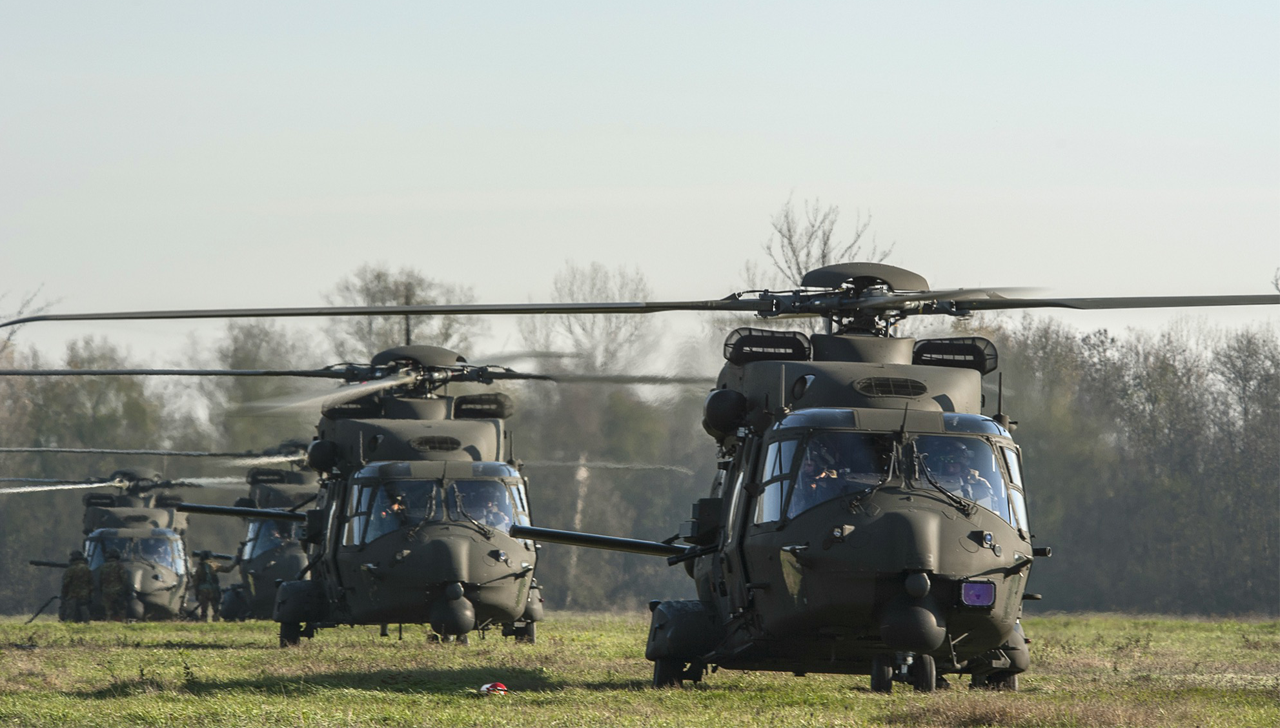
An army can also feature specialized units to give air or sea support. This image depicts the Italian Army 7th Army Aviation Regiment "Vega" transporting troops with NH90 helicopters.

A particular army can be named or numbered to distinguish it from military land forces in general. For example, the First United States Army and the Army of Northern Virginia. In the British Army it is normal to spell out the ordinal number of an army (e.g. First Army), whereas lower formations use figures (e.g. 1st Division).

Armies (as well as army groups and theaters) are large formations which vary significantly between armed forces in size, composition, and scope of responsibility.

In the Soviet Red Army and the Soviet Air Force, "Armies" could vary in size, but were subordinate to an Army Group-sized "front" in wartime. In peacetime, a Soviet army was usually subordinate to a military district. Viktor Suvorov's Inside the Soviet Army describes how Cold War era Soviet military districts were actually composed of a front headquarters and a military district headquarters co-located for administration and deception ('maskirovika') reasons.

=== Formations ===
In many countries, especially in Europe or North America, armies are often subdivided as follows:

| Field army: A field army is composed of a headquarters, army troops, a variable number of corps, typically between three and four, and a variable number of divisions, also between three and four. A battle is influenced at the Field Army level by transferring divisions and reinforcements from one corps to another to increase the pressure on the enemy at a critical point. Field armies are controlled by a general or lieutenant general. |
| Corps: A corps usually consists of two or more divisions and is commanded by a lieutenant general. |
| Division: Each division is commanded by a major general, and usually holds three brigades including infantry, artillery, engineers and communications units in addition to logistics (supply and service) support to sustain independent action. Except for the divisions operating in the mountains, divisions have at least one armored unit, some have even more depending upon their functionality. The basic building block of all ground force combat formations is the infantry division. |
| Brigade: A brigade is under the command of a brigadier or brigadier general and sometimes is commanded by a colonel. It typically comprises three or more battalions of different units depending on its functionality. An independent brigade would be one that primarily consists of an artillery unit, an infantry unit, an armour unit and logistics to support its actions. Such a brigade is not part of any division and is under direct command of a corps. |
| Battalion: Each battalion is commanded by a colonel or sometimes by lieutenant colonel who commands roughly 500 to 750 soldiers. This number varies depending on the functionality of the regiment. A battalion comprises 3–5 companies (3 rifle companies, a fire support company and headquarters company) or its functional equivalent such as batteries (artillery) or squadrons (armour and cavalry), each under the command of a major. The company can be divided into platoons, each of which can again be divided into sections or squads. (Terminology is nationality and even unit specific.) |

== See also ==
- Lists of armies
- List of armies by country
- List of army units called Guards
- List of numbered armies
- List of countries by number of military and paramilitary personnel
- Military organization
- Paramilitary
