= Lists of armies =

Lists of armies include:

- List of armies by country
- List of numbered armies
- List of formations of the United States Army
- List of British armies in the First World War
- List of French armies in World War I
- List of Russian armies in World War I
- List of Soviet armies
- List of Italian armies in World War I
- Armies of the Imperial Japanese Army
- List of British armies in World War II
- List of Polish armies in World War II
