= 19 Squadron =

19 Squadron or 19th Squadron may refer to:

- No. 19 Squadron RAF, a unit of the Royal Air Force
- No. 19 Squadron RAAF, a current unit of the Royal Australian Air Force
- No. 19 (Netherlands East Indies) Squadron RAAF, a unit of the Royal Australian Air Force and the Royal Netherlands East Indies Army Air Force in the 1940s
- No. 19 Squadron IAF, a unit of the Indian Air Force
- No. 19 Squadron RNZAF, a unit of the Royal New Zealand Air Force
- No. 19 Squadron PAF, a unit of the Pakistani Air Force
- 19 Squadron SAAF, a unit of the South African Air Force
- Fliegerstaffel 19, a unit of the Swiss Air Force
- 19th Fighter Squadron, a unit of the United States Air Force
- 19th Special Operations Squadron, a unit of the United States Air Force
- 19th Airlift Squadron, an inactive unit of the United States Air Force
- 19th Air Refueling Squadron, an inactive unit of the United States Air Force
- Submarine Squadron 19, a unit of the United States Navy
- VUP-19, a unit of the United States Navy

== See also ==
- Torpedo Boat Squadron 19
- 19th Corps (disambiguation)
- 19th Division (disambiguation)
- 19th Brigade (disambiguation)
- 19th Regiment (disambiguation)
- 19th Group (disambiguation)
- 19th Battalion (disambiguation)
