= 19th Radio Intercept Brigade =

19th Special Purpose Radio Intercept Brigade
- 19-та бригада радіоперехоплення спеціального призначення
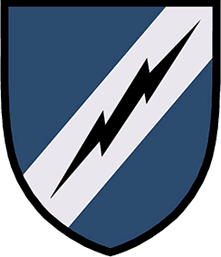
- Active: 1992 – present
- Country: Ukraine
- Allegiance: Armed Forces of Ukraine
- Branch: Ukrainian Air Force
- Type: Radio-Technical Troops
- Role: Radar and Radio Interception, Reconnaissance, Air Traffic Control
- Size: Brigade
- Part of: Air Force General Command
- Garrison/HQ: Halytsinove, Mykolaiv Oblast
- Nickname: Pivdenobuzka Brigade
- Engagements: Russo-Ukrainian war: War in Donbas; Full scale invasion 2022
- Decorations: For Courage and Bravery

The 19th Separate Special Purpose Radio Intercept Brigade Pivdenobuzka (MUN A3767) is a Brigade of the Ukrainian Air Force concerned with radar and radio interception operations and is subordinated to the General Air Command. It is headquartered in Halitsinove.

== History ==
On 6 August 2023, it was awarded the honorary title Pivdenobuzka by President of Ukraine Volodymyr Zelenskyy.

On 31 October 2024, a soldier of the Regiment was killed in action in Novodmytrivka.

On 3 August 2025, it was awarded the honorary award For Courage and Bravery by the president.

== Structure ==
19th Special Purpose Radio Intercept Brigade

  - Management & Headquarters
  - 1st Radio Intercept Battalion
  - 2nd Radio Intercept Battalion
  - 8th Separate Battalion of Radio and Radio Technical Intelligence and Radio Electronic Warfare
  - Logistical Support Platoon
  - Commandant Platoon
