= RMAF Butterworth Air Base =

Military airbase of the Royal Malaysian Air Force in Seberang Perai, Penang, Malaysia

RMAF Butterworth TUDM Butterworth
- IATA: BWH; ICAO: WMKB

Summary
- Airport type: Military
- Owner: Ministry of Defence
- Operator: Royal Malaysian Air Force
- Location: Butterworth, Penang, Malaysia
- Time zone: MST (UTC+08:00)
- Elevation AMSL: 8 ft (2.4 m)
- Coordinates: 05°27′58″N 100°23′28″E
- Interactive map of RMAF Butterworth

Runways
Direction	Length		Surface
Direction	m	ft	Surface
18/36	2,438	7,999	Asphalt
- Sources: AIP Malaysia

RMAF Butterworth
- Butterworth, Penang in Malaysia

Site information
- Type: Military air force station
- Owner: Ministry of Defence
- Operator: Royal Malaysian Air Force

Location
- Location in West Malaysia
- Coordinates: 05°27′58″N 100°23′28″E

RMAF Butterworth (Malay: TUDM Butterworth) is an active Air Force Station of the Royal Malaysian Air Force (RMAF) situated 4.5 nautical miles (8.3 km; 5.2 mi) from Butterworth in Penang, Malaysia. It is currently home to the Headquarters Integrated Area Defence System (HQIADS), part of the Five Power Defence Arrangements (FPDA).

The airfield was originally known as RAF Station Butterworth and later as RAAF Butterworth, under the operational commands of the Royal Air Force (RAF) and the Royal Australian Air Force (RAAF) respectively. Although the airfield is now a RMAF base, under the terms of the FPDA the RAAF are a co-tenant of the base, maintaining an operational presence in the region alongside the RMAF squadrons. The airfield and associated base facilities are colloquially referred to as Butterworth.

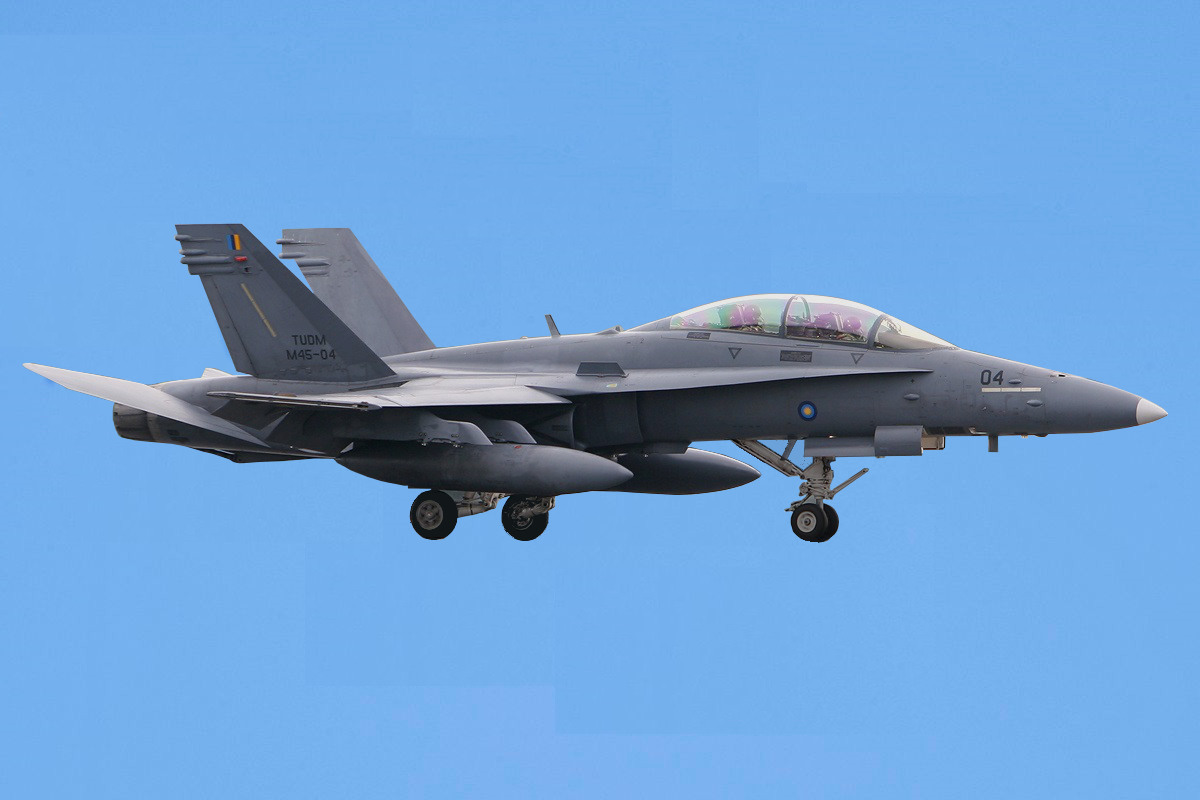
RMAF Butterworth is the base of F/A-18 Hornets of the RMAF.

== History ==
=== RAF Butterworth ===
RAF Butterworth badge.

An airfield at Butterworth was originally established in 1939 by the RAF on a “care and maintenance” basis. In October 1941, RAF Butterworth was officially opened as part of Britain's World War II plans for defending the Malayan Peninsula against the threat of invasion by the Imperial Japanese forces.

During the Japanese invasion of Malaya in December 1941, the airfield came under attack from aircraft of the Imperial Japanese Navy Air Service and suffered damage from the Mitsubishi G3M and Mitsubishi G4M bombers. Obsolete RAF Brewster Buffalo fighters based at the airfield took to the air to engage the escorting Mitsubishi A6M Zero fighters but suffered heavy losses against the highly trained and experienced Japanese fighter pilots. The airfield was captured by the advancing 25th Army on 20 December 1941 and remained under the control of the Imperial Japanese Army until September 1945. Following cessation of hostilities the RAF resumed control of the airfield and Japanese prisoners of war were put to work repairing the runways and making general improvements to the airfield. RAF air operations resumed in May 1946.

From 1948 to 1963 RAF, RAAF and Royal New Zealand Air Force (RNZAF) units were stationed at the airfield as part of the Commonwealth Strategic Reserve. During the Malayan Emergency from 1950 these units played an active role against the communist insurgency by attacking suspected jungle hideouts of the communist guerrillas. During this time the airfield also hosted various units on rotation from RAF Changi, RAF Kuala Lumpur, RAF Kuantan, RAF Seletar and RAF Tengah. The base was also used by RAF aircraft transiting from bases in the Indian Ocean (RAF Gan in the Maldives), Middle East (RAF Khormaksar in Aden) and Mediterranean (RAF Akrotiri in Cyprus) en route to other bases in the Far East region, such as Singapore, North Borneo and Hong Kong.

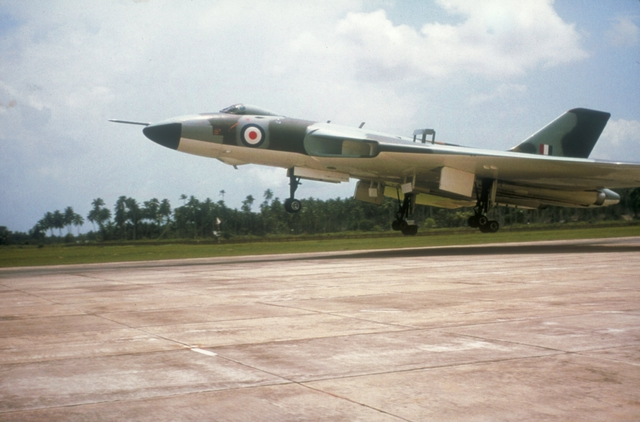
An Avro Vulcan of RAF in 1965 during Indonesia–Malaysia confrontation.

RAF units that were stationed at Butterworth during the Emergency included:

- No. 20 Squadron equipped with the Hunter FGA.9
- No. 45 Squadron equipped with the Venom FB.1 & 4 and later Canberra B.15
- No. 60 Squadron equipped with the Javelin FAW.9
- No. 81 Squadron equipped with the Canberra PR.7

No. 27 Armament Practice Camp RAF was here between 1 January 1949 and 20 September 1954. Armament Practice Camp, Butterworth RAF was here between 1 April 1955 and 30 April 1956.

In 1957 the RAF closed the station, with control formally passing to the RAAF the following year, although the property itself remained under RAF ownership.

=== RAAF Butterworth ===
RAAF Butterworth badge

Following closure of RAF Butterworth in 1957, control was formally transferred to the RAAF on 30 June 1958. The station was originally renamed RAAF Station Butterworth and later RAAF Butterworth and was the RAAF's first permanent major air base outside of Australia in the post-WW2 era. The base was home to numerous Australian fighter and bomber squadrons stationed in Malaya during the Cold War era. During the Vietnam War the base provided aircraft and maintenance personnel in support of deployments and also provided medical and transport support facilities.

At its peak in the 1970s the base was home to almost 5,000 Australian personnel and their families, but as at 2007 this has dwindled down to a permanent staff of just 40 RAAF personnel and 126 from the Australian Army (although the average number deployed at the base during annual exercises is around 700). The RAAF also employs 75 local civilian staff.

Two notable RAAF fighter units stationed at the base were No. 3 Squadron RAAF and No. 77 Squadron RAAF which saw service with their CAC Sabres during the Malayan Emergency through the confrontation with Indonesia. From August 1964 onward, these Sabre jets responded on several occasions to approaches by MiG-21 fighter jets of the Indonesian Air Force towards Malaysian airspace, but the Indonesian aircraft always turned back before crossing the international boundary, thereby averting possible conflict. Another notable unit was No. 2 Squadron RAAF which arrived at Butterworth in July 1958. Flying Canberra bombers, the squadron flew missions immediately after arriving including formation bombing runs against Communist guerrilla targets, and remained at Butterworth until 1967 when it moved to Phan Rang Air Base in Vietnam.

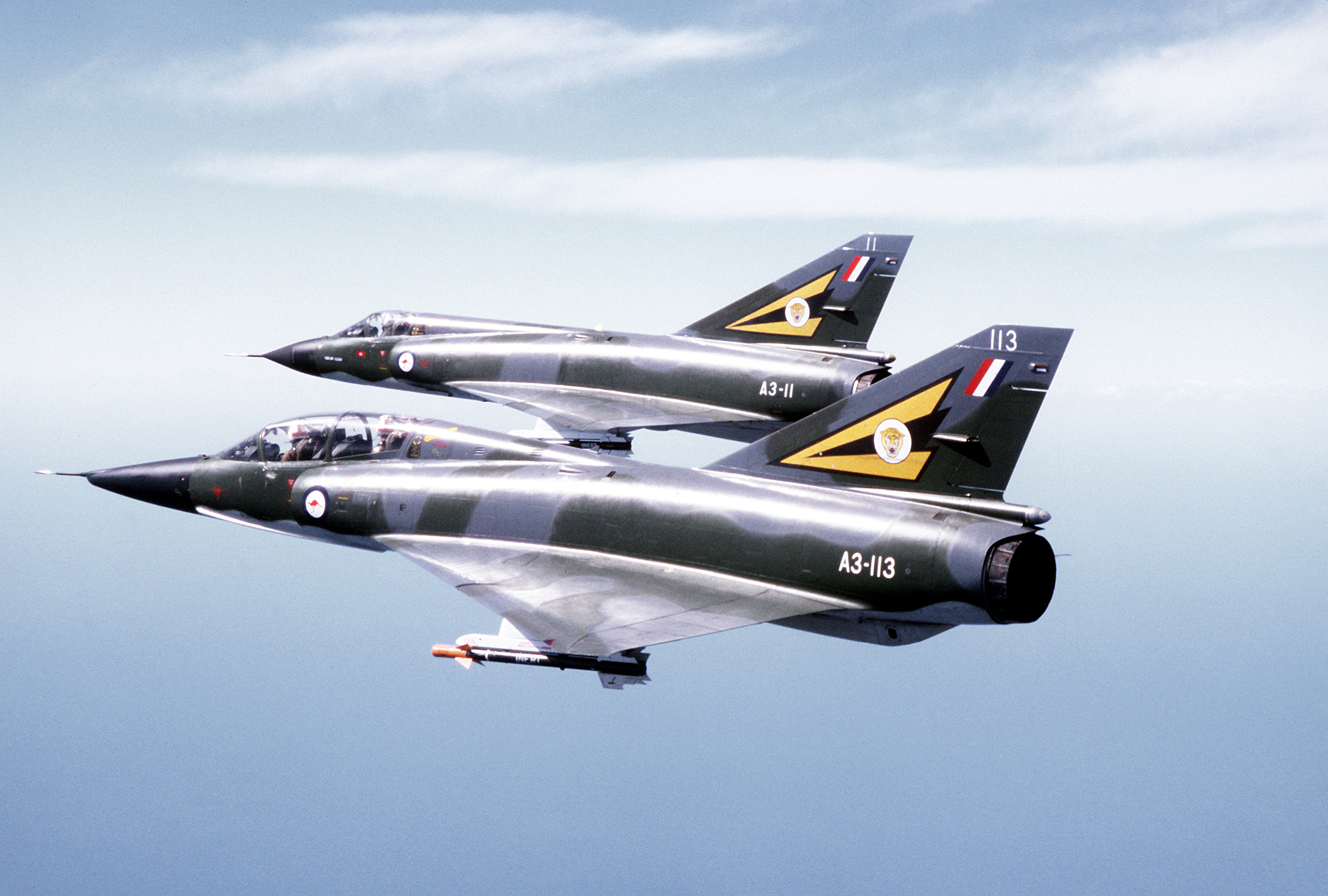
RAAF once stationed their Mirage IIIO in Butterworth Air Base.

During this period, No. 33 Squadron RAF was stationed at Butterworth to provide ground to air defence with Bloodhound missiles. No. 20 Squadron RAF with Hunter FGA.9 aircraft were detached here as also were RAF Vulcans and Canberras. No. 52 Squadron RAF provided air supply support to ground troops and police working in the Peninsular Malaysia jungle areas with their Valetta C2 twin engine aircraft along with RAF Single and Twin Pioneer aircraft. 52 Squadron also provided air support to units working in the Borneo jungle areas. The RAF also provided air-sea rescue helicopters (Whirlwinds) and Rescue & Range Safety Launches (RTTL & RSL) from RAF Glugor on Penang Island. Other RAF aircraft seen regularly included Britannia, Hercules and Andover transports and RAF Victor tankers when transiting fighter aircraft such as Lightnings through to Singapore.

No. 75 Squadron RAAF arrived at Butterworth with the Mirage IIIOs on 18 May 1967, replacing 3 Squadron who returned to Australia to themselves re-equip with the Mirage. 3 Squadron returned in February 1969 - replacing 77 Squadron - with both squadrons also alternating responsibility for the detachment at RAF Tengah in Singapore. 75 Squadron remained at Butterworth until it was withdrawn to RAAF Darwin in October 1983, with 3 Squadron following to RAAF Base Williamtown in 1986. A number of former 3 Squadron aircraft and personnel remained at Butterworth and were formed as No. 79 Squadron RAAF, until they finally departed in May 1988.

As of October 2008, the Australian Defence Force continues to maintain a presence at Butterworth as part of Australia's commitment to the FPDA, with No. 19 Squadron RAAF of the Combat Support Group (No. 95 Wing) and a detachment of AP-3C Orion aircraft from No. 92 Wing RAAF being located at the airfield, along with various units from the Australian Army.

==== RAAF Club ====
In January 1962 the RAAF Club opened at 10 Tanjung Tokong in Penang to provide social and sporting facilitates for RAAF personnel and their families during their stay at Butterworth. At its peak it provided for over 800 families, as well as those of Australian government public servants stationed in Malaysia.

The centre originally operated as a hostel with a total of 72 rooms and later included the Penang Health Centre and the Penang Housing Section. It also housed chaplains, the Public Health Section, RAAF police, Supervisor RAAF Centre and the transport office. A convenience store, barber and hairdresser, gift shop, library, post office and a travel bureau also provided services to the club's members.

In the 1980s the number of RAAF personnel serving at Butterworth was reduced which led to the closure of the RAAF Club. A new and smaller club was later established for the families who lived permanently in Penang.

==== RAAF School ====
Increasing numbers of RAAF officers and airmen serving at Butterworth during the 1950s required the provision of schooling for their dependants. In October 1958, the Department of Air established a permanent school in Penang Island, leasing 8 Residency Road as a primary school for children up to year eight. Teaching staff for the school were selected from the Department of Education of New South Wales and Victoria. Later, 4 Residency Road was leased for an infants’ school and 10 Residency Road as a secondary school. The number of enrolments rose to 289 infants, 345 primary and 102 secondary students.

As the number of personnel serving at Butterworth increased the Residency Road schools became crowded and inadequate, and work began to build a bigger school. On 30 March 1962 the RAAF School on Jalan Azyzeat Hillside Penang was completed and officially opened on 9 May 1962. The school consisted of three main buildings, an assembly hall and an attap hut for infants. In September 1965, a new attap hut was built for primary students. Enrolments peaked at around 1,100 in 1977.

The reduction in the RAAF's presence at Butterworth in 1988 led to the school's closure, with the high school closing at the end of 1987 and the primary and infants' schools in mid-1988, with the remaining students now attending the nearby international schools in Penang. The former RAAF School building are now used as the RMAF training facility and administration centre.

==== Rifle Company Butterworth ====
Since the early 1970s a rifle company has been stationed at Butterworth, drawn from units of the Australian Army on a rotational basis. The unit is designated Rifle Company Butterworth. While the unit's initial focus was protection of the airfield and base facilities and personnel, in recent years its emphasis has shifted to training and bilateral exercises in Malaysia, Singapore and Thailand.

=== RMAF Butterworth ===
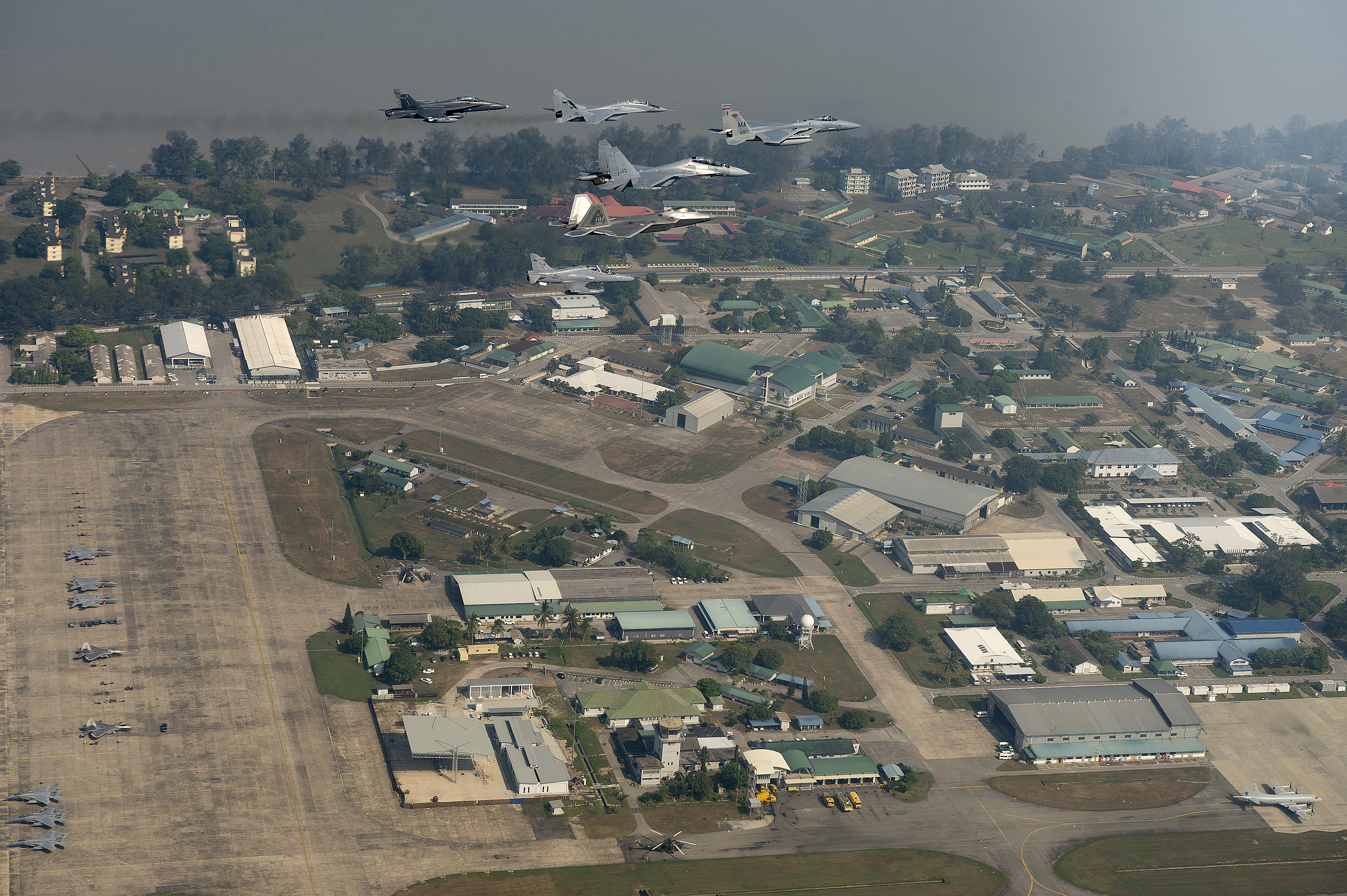
Fighter jets of the Royal Malaysian Air Force and the United States Air Force over RMAF Butterworth.

In 1970, following Malaysian independence, control of the base passed from the RAAF to the RMAF, and ownership of the property was ceded to the Malaysian Government; the base was formally renamed to RMAF Butterworth. As the RMAF was in its infancy and not in a position to fully take over an air defence role, two RAAF fighter squadrons were based at Butterworth until 1988.

== Current status ==
Although the base is under Malaysian control, under the terms of the FPDA command authority resides with the Commander Integrated Area Defence System (CIADS), an Australian air vice-marshal, and the RAAF remains as a co-tenant, the only foreign power with a permanent presence on the base. Aside from the active RMAF and RAAF squadrons housed at the base, Butterworth routinely supports deployments of aircraft from the RAAF's Air Combat, Air Lift and Aerospace Operational Support Group.

In 2018 the Australia government announced a AUS$22 million upgrade of the base, to ensure Butterworth "remains fit for purpose well into the future." Then Defence Industry Minister, Christopher Pyne, stated improvements were needed for the base to support the RAAF's new Lockheed Martin F-35 Lightning II during regional exercises.

=== RMAF units ===
The RMAF stations the following units at Butterworth:

- No. 3 Squadron RMAF, operates 4 AgustaWestland AW139 (leased from Weststar Aviation as interim S-61A-4 Nuri replacement). Formerly operated S-61A-4 Nuri helicopters (Retired at the end of 2019, however the 3rd Squadron still maintain to be a working Squadron, awaiting for future acquisition of new utility helicopter fleet)
- No. 15 Squadron RMAF, with BAE Hawk 108/Hawk 208
- No. 18 Squadron RMAF, with Boeing F/A-18D Hornets

=== Other Malaysian Armed Forces' Units ===
- 509 Rejimen Askar Wataniah (509th Territorial Army Regiment)
- Unit Bantuan Utara, TLDM (Royal Malaysian Navy - Northern Region Support Unit)

=== RAAF units ===
Under the terms of the FPDA, the RAAF stations the following units at Butterworth:

- No. 19 Squadron (19SQN)
- No. 92 Wing Detachment Alpha (92WG Det A), with Boeing P-8 Poseidon

These deployments make up the RAAF's only permanent air base outside of Australia.

=== Other permanent units ===
The following units of the Australian Defence Force are also stationed at Butterworth:

- 2nd/30th Training Group, Australian Army
- Australian Defence Force Investigative Service (Joint Investigation Office Butterworth)
- Joint Health Command (Butterworth Clinic)
- Land Command Liaison Section, Australian Army (as at May 2007)
- Rifle Company Butterworth, Australian Army

=== Visiting units ===
RMAF Butterworth often hosts visiting units from nations which comprise the FPDA, particularly for the annual Exercise Bersama Lima. Aircraft from overseas squadrons participating in the exercise often include:

- RAF Typhoon fighters and Voyager MRTTs
- RAAF F/A-18F Super Hornets & MH-60R Seahawk helicopters of the Royal Australian Navy
- RNZAF P-3K2 Orions and Royal New Zealand Navy SH-2G Seasprite helicopters.

In 2013, after a break of 15 years, the exercise was joined by five F-16 Fighting Falcons from 140 Squadron of the Republic of Singapore Air Force (RSAF).

The airfield also hosts visiting aircraft from the Royal Thai Air Force.

== Accessibility ==
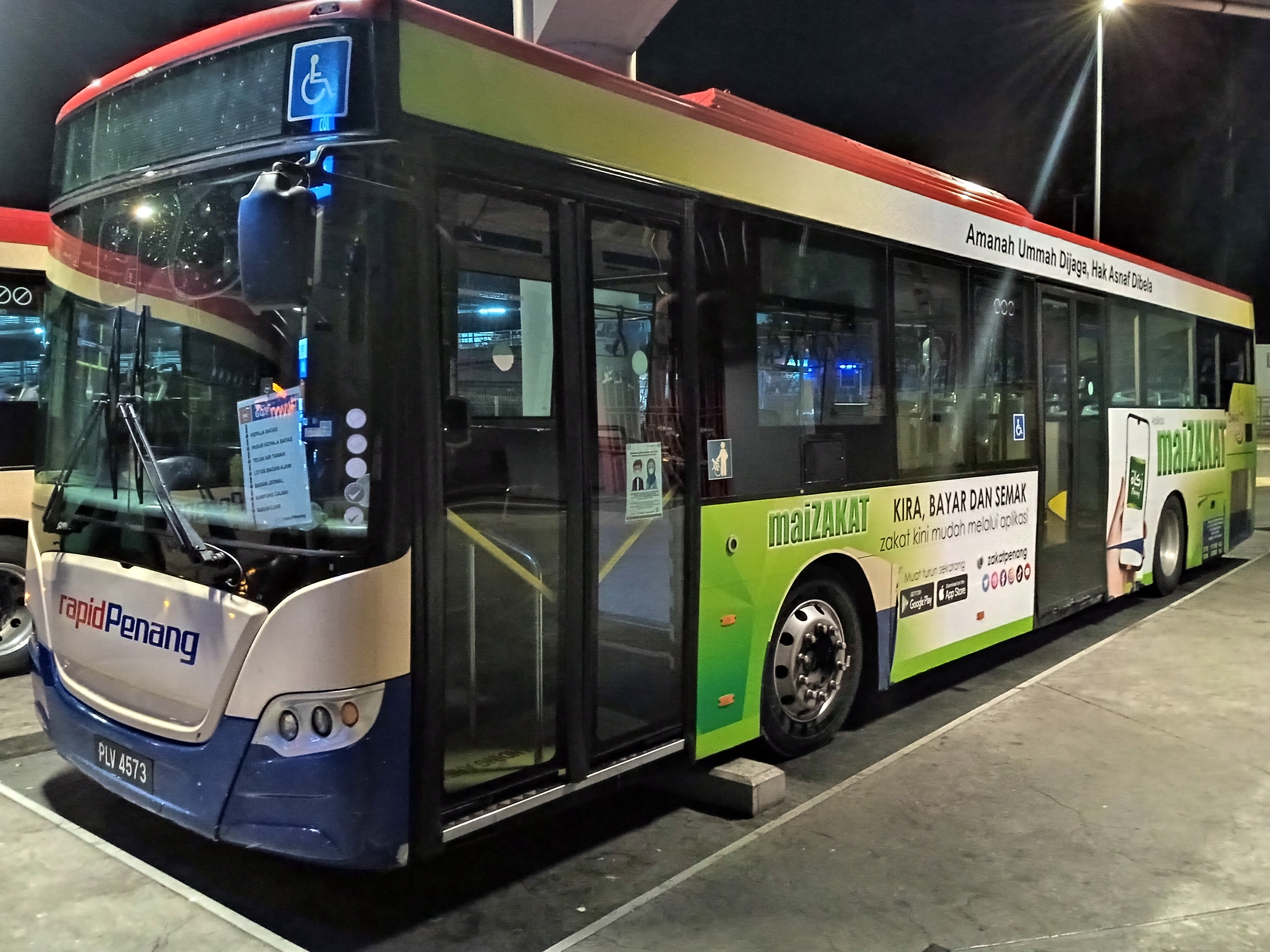
Rapid Penang bus route 601 at Penang Sentral

The area is accessible by Rapid Penang bus route 601 (Penang Sentral Bus Terminal–Kepala Batas), along Jalan Teluk Air Tawar, part of Malaysia Federal Route 1.

== See also ==
- Royal Malaysian Air Force bases
- Far East Air Force (Royal Air Force)
- Former overseas RAF bases
