= Nineteenth of the month =

Recurring ordinal calendar date

The nineteenth of the month or nineteenth day of the month is the recurring calendar date position corresponding to the day numbered 19 of each month. In the Gregorian calendar (and other calendars that number days sequentially within a month), this day occurs in every month of the year, and therefore occurs twelve times per year.

- Nineteenth of January
- Nineteenth of February
- Nineteenth of March
- Nineteenth of April
- Nineteenth of May
- Nineteenth of June
- Nineteenth of July
- Nineteenth of August
- Nineteenth of September
- Nineteenth of October
- Nineteenth of November
- Nineteenth of December

In addition to these dates, this date occurs in months of many other calendars, such as the Bengali calendar and the Hebrew calendar.

== See also ==
- Nineteenth (disambiguation)
