= 19th Division =

19th Division or 19th Infantry Division may refer to:

== Infantry divisions ==
- 19th Infantry Division (Bangladesh)
- 19th Division (German Empire)
- 19th Ersatz Division, German Empire
- 19th Landwehr Division, German Empire
- 19th Reserve Division, German Empire
- 19th Grenadier Division, Germany
- 19th Infantry Division (Wehrmacht)
- 19th Waffen Grenadier Division of the SS (2nd Latvian)
- 19th Mechanized Division (Greece)
- 19th Infantry Division (India)
- 19th Infantry Division "Venezia", Kingdom of Italy
- 19th Division (Imperial Japanese Army)
- 19th Division (North Korea)
- 19th Infantry Division (Ottoman Empire)
- 19th Infantry Division (Poland)
- 19th Infantry Division (Russian Empire)
- 19th Guards Mechanized Division, Soviet Union
- 19th Guards Rifle Division, Soviet Union
- 19th Motor Rifle Division, Soviet Union
- 19th Division (Syrian rebel group)
- 19th (Western) Division, United Kingdom
- 19th Division (United States)
- 19th Division (Yugoslav Partisans)

== Armoured divisions ==
- 19th Panzer Division, Germany
- 19th Armored Division (United States)

== Aviation divisions ==
- 19th Air Division, United States

== Anti-air divisions ==
- 19th Flak Division, Germany

== See also ==
- 19th Corps (disambiguation)
- 19th Brigade (disambiguation)
- 19th Regiment (disambiguation)
- 19th Group (disambiguation)
- 19th Battalion (disambiguation)
- 19th Squadron (disambiguation)
