= No. 19 Squadron RAAF =

19 Squadron
- Active: 30 January 1999 –
- Branch: Royal Australian Air Force
- Part of: No. 396 Combat Support Wing RAAF (369 CSW)
- Garrison/HQ: RMAF Base Butterworth
- Motto(s): Strength and Service

No. 19 Squadron (19 SQN), formerly 324 Combat Support Squadron (324CSS), is a Royal Australian Air Force ground support squadron based at Royal Malaysian Air Force Base Butterworth in Penang. 324CSS was formed on 30 January 1999 and took on its new name of 19 SQN on 1 January 2014. 19SQN is responsible for providing support to Australian Defence Force exercises and deployments in South-East Asia. 19SQN's day-to-day responsibilities focus on supporting the ADF units and personnel at RMAF Base Butterworth, including a detachment of Boeing P-8 Poseidon aircraft from No. 92 Wing RAAF and the Australian Army's Rifle Company Butterworth.
