= No. 19 Squadron IAF =

No. 19 Squadron
- Insignia of The No. 19 Squadron IAF
- Active: 24 May 1960–27 July 1977; 1 Apr 1985–25 Oct 1990; 1 Mar 2022–present
- Country: Republic of India
- Allegiance: Indian Armed Forces
- Branch: Indian Air Force
- Role: Transport
- Garrison/HQ: Port Blair AFS
- Mottos: Kiyathi Baar Samayanim; How much load time

Aircraft flown
- Transport: Dornier 228

No. 19 Squadron is a unit of the Indian Air Force assigned to Southern Air Command. The Squadron participates in operations involving air, land and airdrop of troops, equipment, supplies, and support or augment special operations forces, when appropriate.

== History ==
The No. 19 Squadron was established in Agra AFS in 1960 with C-119G Packets. Later, the squadron operated in Srinagar in summer and Pathankot in winter to air drop to advanced landing bases at Leh, Fukche and Chushul. The squadron did the first landing at Nyoma Rap in 1962 and Daulat Beg Oldi in 1962, using the J-34 jet engine. It was number plated on 27 July 1977 before being revived on 1 Apr 1985 at Delhi with Dakota aircraft. On 1 April 1988 it changed over to the AN-32 and was subsequently merged with No.33 Sqn on 25 October 1990. It was revived in 2022 with Dornier 228 aircraft at Port Blair.

== Aircraft ==
- Fairchild C-119 (1960-77)
- Douglas C-47 (1985-88)
- Antonov AN-32 (1988-90)
- Dornier 228 (2020-present)
