= 19th Landwehr Division =

- 19. Landwehr-Division
- Active: World War I
- Country: German Empire
- Branch: Imperial German Army

The 19th Landwehr Division (19. Landwehr-Division) was a unit of the Imperial German Army in World War I.
