= 19 =

Nineteen or 19 may refer to:

- 19 (number), the natural number following 18 and preceding 20
- One of the years 19 BC, AD 19, 1919, 2019

== Films ==
- 19 (film), a 2001 Japanese film
- Nineteen (1987 film), a 1987 science fiction film
- 19-Nineteen, a 2009 South Korean film
- Diciannove, a 2024 Italian drama film informally referred to as "Nineteen" in some sources

== Science ==
- Potassium, an alkali metal
- 19 Fortuna, an asteroid

== Music ==
- 19 (band), a Japanese pop music duo

=== Albums ===
- 19 (Adele album), 2008
- 19 (Alsou album), 2003
- 19 (Evan Yo album), 2006
- 19, a 2018 album by MHD
- 19, one half of the double album 63/19 by Kool A.D.
- 19, a 2020 EP by WHOKILLEDXIX
- Number Nineteen, a 1971 album by American jazz pianist Mal Waldron
- XIX (EP), a 2019 EP by 1the9

=== Songs ===
- "19" (song), a 1985 song by British musician Paul Hardcastle
- "Stone in Focus", officially "#19", a composition by Aphex Twin
- "Nineteen" (Phil Lynott song), 1985
- "Nineteen", a song from the 1992 album Refugee by Bad4Good
- "Nineteen", a song from the 2001 album Almost Heathen by Karma to Burn
- "Nineteen" (Billy Ray Cyrus song), 2007
- "Nineteen", a song from the 2007 album The Con by Tegan and Sara
- "XIX" (song), a 2014 song by Slipknot
- 19, a song from the 2001 album Heartbreak in Stereo by Pencey Prep

== Transport and vehicular ==
- Highway 19; see List of highways numbered 19
- Renault 19, a small family car
- Tyrrell 019, a racecar
- Mecklenburg XIX, a class of German steam locomotives

== Other uses ==
- 19 Entertainment, a company owned by Sony Pictures Television

== See also ==
- COVID-19, an infectious disease
- Wireless Set No. 19, a Second World War mobile radio transceiver used by the British Army
