= 19 (Evan Yo album) =

- 19+1 Celebration Edition cover

Studio album 首張創作專輯19 by Evan Yo
- Released: 6 October 2006
- Genre: Mandopop
- Length: 43:15
- Language: Mandarin
- Label: Sony Music Taiwan

Evan Yo chronology
19 (2006)	Search Evan Yo (2008)

19 (Chinese: 首張創作專輯19) is Taiwanese Mandopop artist Evan Yo's (Chinese: 蔡旻佑) debut Mandarin solo studio album. It was released by Sony Music Taiwan on 6 October 2006.

The album is named 19 because Yo was nineteen when the album was released and all the tracks are composed by him. A second edition was released on 12 December 2006, 19+1 Celebration Edition (首張創作專輯19+1 限量紀念盤). It included a bonus DVD with three music videos and behind-the-scenes footage, as listed in the Music video section.

== Track listing ==
1. "Intro
2. "夢不落帝國" (Neverland)
3. "Can You Hear Me"
4. "城外" (Outside the Walled City)
5. "超人不在家" (Superman is Not at Home)
6. "我可以" (I Can)
7. "旋轉門" (Revolving door)
8. "簡單" (Easy)
9. "熱氣球" (Hot-Air Balloon)
10. "翻不完的夏天" (Never-Ending Summer)
11. "我想要說" (I Want to Say)
12. "8 Bit"

== Music videos ==
- "城外" (Outside the Walled City) MV
- "我可以" (I Can) MV
- "翻不完的夏天" (Never-Ending Summer) MV
