= List of Italian armies in World War I =

This is a list of Italian field armies that existed during World War I:

- 1st Army
- 2nd Army
- 3rd Army
- 4th Army
- 5th Army
- 6th Army
- 7th Army
- 8th Army
- 9th Army
- 10th Army
- 12th Army

== See also ==
- Military history of Italy during World War I
