= Nineteenth Amendment =

Nineteenth Amendment may refer to:

- Nineteenth Amendment of the Constitution of India, which enabled trial of election petitions by High Courts
- Nineteenth Amendment of the Constitution of Ireland, which introduced changes to Articles 2 and 3 of the constitution required by the Good Friday Agreement
- Nineteenth Amendment to the Constitution of Pakistan, which made many amendments to the existing articles
- Nineteenth Amendment to the Constitution of Sri Lanka, which established the Constitutional Council, proposed the Independent Commissions
- Nineteenth Amendment to the United States Constitution, which prohibited states and the federal government from denying the right to vote on the basis of sex.
