= Novodmytrivka =

Novodmytrivka or Novodmitrivka may refer to:

- Novodmytrivka, Pokrovsk Raion, Donetsk Oblast, Ukraine
- Novodmytrivka, Sumy Oblast, Ukraine
