= 19th Cavalry Regiment (United States) =

- Active: 1967–1995
- Country: United States
- Branch: United States Army
- Type: Reconnaissance (Parent Regiment under United States Army Regimental System)
- Part of: 29th Infantry Brigade (Troop E)
- Garrison/HQ: Wahiawa, Hawaii (Troop E)
- Nickname(s): "Na Lele Lio" (literally "The Flying Horses" in Hawaiian)

Commanders
- Notable commanders: Gary M. Hara

The 19th Cavalry Regiment ("Na Lele Lio", literally "The Flying Horses" in Hawaiian) was a United States Army parent cavalry regiment, represented in the Hawaii Army National Guard by Troop E, 19th Cavalry, part of the 29th Infantry Brigade at Wahiawa.

Constituted and organized in 1967, the regiment was called up during the Vietnam War but did not go overseas, and became an air cavalry unit in the early 1970s. It was disbanded in 1995.

== History ==
The 19th Cavalry was constituted on 24 October 1967 in the Hawaii Army National Guard as a parent regiment under the Combat Arms Regimental System (CARS). It was organized and Federally recognized on 17 December 1967 at Wahiawa to consist of Troop E, part of the 29th Infantry Brigade. During the Vietnam War in May 1968, the 29th Brigade was mobilized for active Federal service to serve as the strategic reserve for United States Army Pacific. Troop E was ordered into active Federal service on 13 May 1968 at Wahiawa, under the command of Captain Kazumasa Ota. The troop spent its active service period training at Schofield Barracks, and was also equipped with the M114A1 armored fighting vehicle at the time. In June, the troop received ten M551 Sheridan tanks, the first time the Sheridan was sent outside of the continental United States. It was released from active service and reverted to state control on 12 December 1969.

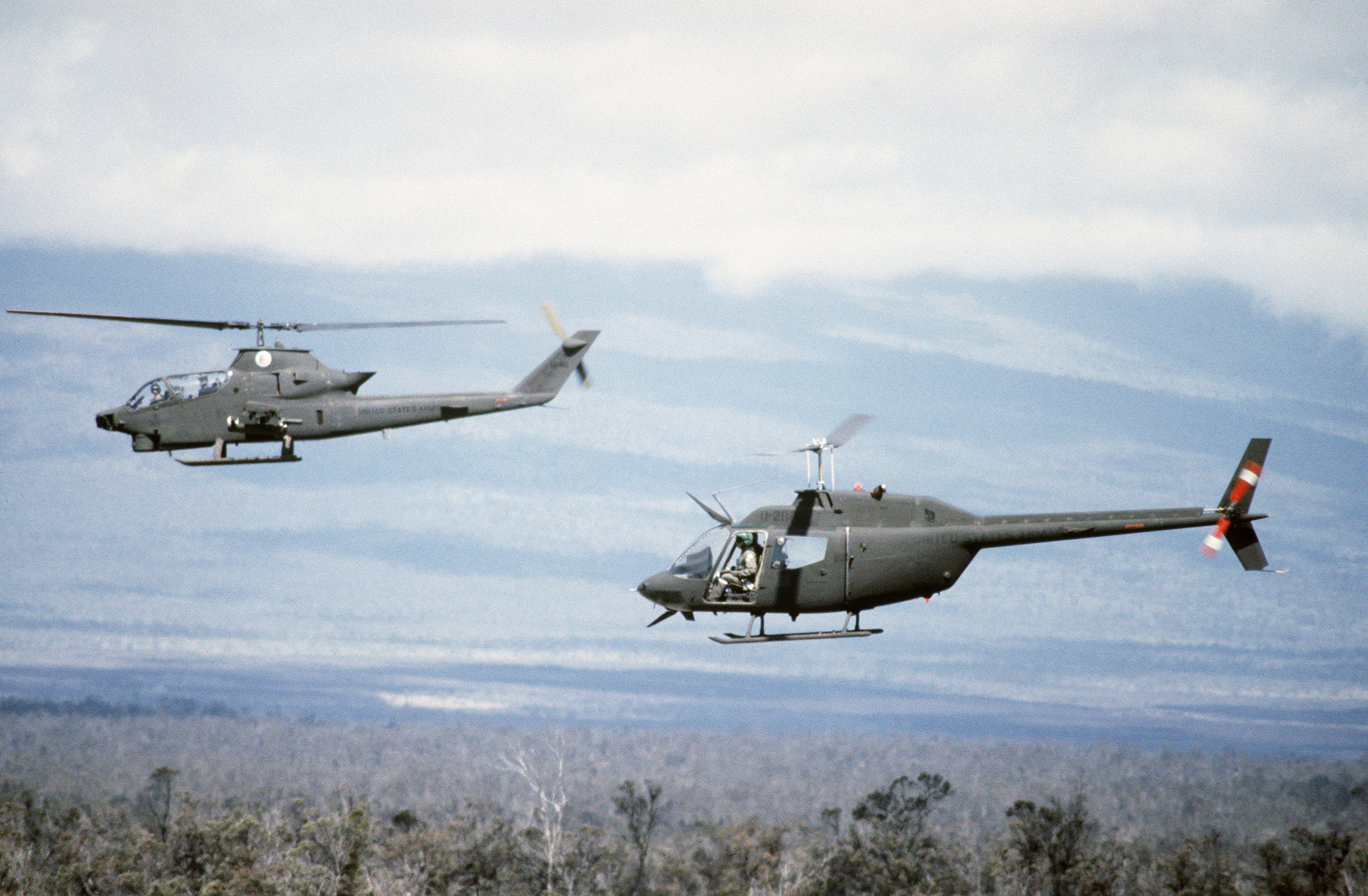
An AH-1 Cobra helicopter (front) and an OH-58 Kiowa of the troop flying in formation during Exercise Opportune Journey, 1985

In 1974, the troop became the first Guard unit to receive the Bell AH-1 HueyCobra attack helicopter and was redesignated Troop E (Air). It spent its two-week annual training period in August 1980 at the Pohakuloa Training Area alongside troops of the 25th Infantry Division. Around January 1984, the troop received nine AH-1S Cobra helicopters, replacing the older Cobras. Between November 1984 and October 1986, it was commanded by Captain (later Major) Gary M. Hara, who later became deputy commanding general of United States Army Pacific. On 31 July 1986, one of the troop's Bell OH-58A Kiowa helicopters crashed, slightly injuring the pilot and aerial observer. On 1 June 1989, it was withdrawn from CARS and reorganized under United States Army Regimental System (USARS) with headquarters at Fort Ruger.

The 29th Infantry Brigade became an enhanced readiness unit on 1 September 1995. Troop E, 19th Cavalry was one of the units inactivated on the same date as part of the transition, in which the brigade incorporated units from Oregon and California. Troop F, 82nd Cavalry from the Oregon Army National Guard replaced Troop E, 19th Cavalry as the brigade reconnaissance troop.
