= List of numbered armies =

This is a list of armies arranged by ordinal numeral.

== First Army ==
- First Allied Airborne Army
- First Army (Australia)
- First Army (Austria-Hungary)
- First Army (Bulgaria)
- First Canadian Army
- New 1st Army (Republic of China)
- 1st Army (Czechoslovakia)
- First Army (France)
- 1st Army (German Empire), a World War I field army
- 1st Army (Wehrmacht), a World War II field army
- 1st Panzer Army (Germany)
- 1st Parachute Army (Germany)
- First Army (Greece)
- First Army (Hungary)
- First Army (Italy)
- First Area Army
- First Army (Ottoman Empire)
- First Polish Army (1920)
- First Polish Army (1944–45)
- 1st Army (South Korea)
- First Army (Romania)
- 1st Army (Russian Empire)
- First Army (Serbia)
- 1st Red Banner Army (Soviet Union)
- First Army (Turkey)
- First Army (United Kingdom)
- First United States Army
- 1st Army (Kingdom of Yugoslavia)
- 1st Army (Yugoslav Partisans)

== Second Army ==
- Second Army (Australia)
- Second Army (Austria-Hungary)
- Second Army (Bulgaria)
- Second Army (Egypt)
- Second Army (France)
- 2nd Army (German Empire), a World War I field army
- 2nd Army (Wehrmacht), a World War II field army
- 2nd Panzer Army (Germany)
- Second Army (Hungary)
- Second Army (Italy)
- Second Army (Japan)
- Second Army (Ottoman Empire)
- Second Army (Poland)
- 2nd Army (South Korea)
- 2nd Army (Russian Empire)
- Second Army (Serbia)
- 2nd Red Banner Army (Soviet Union)
- Second Army (Turkey)
- Second United States Army
- Second Army (United Kingdom)
- 2nd Army (Kingdom of Yugoslavia)
- 2nd Army (Yugoslav Partisans)

== Third Army ==
- 3rd Army (Austria-Hungary)
- Third Army (Bulgaria)
- Third Army (Egypt)
- Third Army (France)
- 3rd Army (German Empire), a World War I field army
- 3rd Army (Wehrmacht), a World War II field army
- 3rd Panzer Army (Germany)
- 3rd Army (East Germany)
- Third Army (Ottoman Empire)
- Third Army (Italy)
- Third Army (Romania)
- Third Army (Serbia)
- 3rd Army (Russian Empire)
- 3rd Army (Soviet Union)
- 3rd Guards Army (Soviet Union)
- 3rd Guards Tank Army (Soviet Union)
- 3rd Shock Army (Soviet Union)
- 3rd Air Army (Soviet Union)
- 3rd Army (South Korea)
- Third Army (Turkey)
- Third Army (United Kingdom)
- Third United States Army
- 3rd Army (Kingdom of Yugoslavia)
- 3rd Army (Yugoslav Partisans)

== Fourth Army ==
- 4th Army (Austria-Hungary)
- Fourth Army (Bulgaria)
- Fourth Army (National Revolutionary Army) (Republic of China)
- New Fourth Army (Republic of China)
- Fourth Army (France)
- 4th Army (German Empire), a World War I field army
- 4th Army (Wehrmacht), a World War II field army
- 4th Panzer Army (Germany)
- Fourth Army (Ottoman Empire)
- Fourth Army (Italy)
- Fourth Army (Romania)
- 4th Army (Russian Empire)
- 4th Army (Soviet Union)
- 4th Air Army (Soviet Union and later Russian Federation)
- 4th Guards Army (Soviet Union)
- 20th Guards Army (originally designated as "Fourth Tank Army") (Soviet Union)
- Fourth Army (United Kingdom)
- Fourth United States Army
- 4th Army (Kingdom of Yugoslavia)
- 4th Army (Yugoslav Partisans)

== Fifth Army ==
- Fifth Army (Austria-Hungary)
- Fifth Army (Bulgaria)
- Fifth Army (France)
- 5th Army (German Empire), a World War I field army
- 5th Army (Wehrmacht), a World War II field army
- 5th Panzer Army (Germany)
- Fifth Army (Japan)
- Fifth Army (Ottoman Empire)
- Fifth Army (Italy)
- 5th Army (Russian Empire)
- 5th Army (Soviet Union)
- Fifth Army (United Kingdom)
- Fifth United States Army, another name for United States Army North
- 5th Army (Kingdom of Yugoslavia)

== Sixth Army ==
- Sixth Army (Austria-Hungary)
- Sixth Army (France)
- 6th Army (German Empire), a World War I field army
- 6th Army (Wehrmacht), a World War II field army
- 6th Panzer Army (Germany)
- Sixth Army (Japan)
- Sixth Army (Ottoman Empire)
- Sixth Army (Italy)
- 6th Army (Russian Empire)
- 6th Army (Soviet Union)
- Sixth United States Army
- Sixth United States Army Group - one of only two United States army groups ever activated.
- 6th Army (Kingdom of Yugoslavia)

== Seventh Army ==
- 7th Army (Austria-Hungary)
- Seventh Army (France)
- 7th Army (German Empire), a World War I field army
- 7th Army (Wehrmacht), a World War II field army
- Seventh Army (Ottoman Empire)
- Seventh Army (Italy)
- 7th Army (Russian Empire)
- 7th Army (Soviet Union)
- Seventh United States Army, another name for United States Army Europe
- 7th Army (Kingdom of Yugoslavia)

== Eighth Army ==
- Eighth Route Army, a Chinese Communist force that fought against the Japanese during World War II
- Eighth Army (France)
- 8th Army (German Empire), a World War I field army
- 8th Army (Wehrmacht), a World War II field army
- Japanese Eighth Area Army
- Ottoman Eighth Army
- Eighth Army (Italy), during World War II another name for the Italian Army in Russia
- Eighth Army (United Kingdom)
- Eighth United States Army
- 8th Army (Russian Empire)
- 8th Army (Soviet Union)
- 8th Guards Army (Russia)

== Ninth Army ==
- Ninth Army (France), a field army during World War I and World War II
- 9th Army (German Empire), a World War I field army
- 9th Army (Wehrmacht), a World War II field army
- Ninth Army (Ottoman Empire), a World War I field army
- Ninth Army (Italy)
- 9th Army (Russian Empire), a World War I field army
- 9th Army (Soviet Union), a field army active from 1939–43 and then after the war from 1966-1989
- Ninth Army (United Kingdom), a British Army formation during World War II
- Ninth United States Army, used in Northwest Europe in 1944 and 1945

== Tenth Army ==
- 10th Army (Austria-Hungary)
- Tenth Army (France)
- 10th Army (German Empire), a World War I field army
- 10th Army (Wehrmacht), a World War II field army
- Tenth Army (Japan)
- Tenth Army (Italy)
- 10th Army (Russian Empire)
- 10th Army (Soviet Union)
- Tenth Army (United Kingdom)
- 10th Guards Army (Soviet Union)
- Tenth United States Army

== Eleventh Army ==
- 11th Army (German Empire), a World War I field army
- 11th Army (Wehrmacht), a World War II field army
- 11th SS Panzer Army
- Eleventh Army (Japan)
- Eleventh Army (Italy)
- 11th Air Army (Russia)
- 11th Army (Russian Empire)
- 11th Army (Soviet Union)
- 11th Army Group (United Kingdom)

== Twelfth Army ==
- 12th Army (German Empire), a World War I field army
- 12th Army (Wehrmacht), a World War II field army
- Twelfth Army (Japan)
- 12th Army (Russian Empire)
- 12th Army (Soviet Union)
- Twelfth Army (United Kingdom)
- Twelfth Army (Italy)

== Thirteenth Army ==
- Thirteenth Army (Japan)
- Japanese Thirteenth Area Army
- 13th Army (Russian Empire)

== Fourteenth Army ==
- 14th Army (German Empire), a World War I field army
- 14th Army (Wehrmacht), a World War II field army
- Japanese Fourteenth Area Army
- 14th Army (Soviet Union)
- 14th Guards Army (Soviet Union)
- Fourteenth Army (United Kingdom)
- Fourteenth United States Army, a World War II 'phantom' force

== Fifteenth Army ==
- 15th Army (Wehrmacht), a formation of the German Army during World War II
- Fifteenth Army (Japan), a formation of the Imperial Japanese Army during World War II
- Japanese Fifteenth Area Army, a formation of the Imperial Japanese Army during World War II
- 15th Army Group, a combined formation of the United Kingdom and United States armies during World War II
- Fifteenth United States Army, a formation of the United States Army during World War II

== Sixteenth Army ==
- 16th Army (Wehrmacht), a unit of the German Army in World War II
- 11th Guards Army (16th Army, Soviet Union), a unit of the Soviet Army from World War II through the Cold War
- Western Army (Russia) (16th Soviet Army), a unit of the Soviet Army during World War I
- 16th Army (People's Republic of China), a unit of People's Republic of China which still active right now.

== Seventeenth Army ==
- 17th Army (German Empire), a World War I field Army
- 17th Army (Wehrmacht), a World War II field army
- Seventeenth Army (Japan)
- Japanese Seventeenth Area Army during World War II (see List of Armies of the Japanese Army)
- 17th Army (Soviet Union)

== Eighteenth Army ==
- 18th Army (German Empire), a World War I field Army
- 18th Army (Wehrmacht), a World War II field army
- 18th Army (Soviet Union)
- Eighteenth Army (Japan)

== Nineteenth Army ==
- 19th Army (German Empire), a World War I field Army
- 19th Army (Wehrmacht), a World War II field army
- Nineteenth Army (Japan)
- 19th Army (Soviet Union)

== Twentieth Army ==
- Twentieth Army (Japan)
- 20th Group Army - People's Liberation Army
- 20th Guards Army - Soviet Union and Russia
- 20th Army (Soviet Union)
- 20th Mountain Army (Wehrmacht)

== Twenty first Army ==
- 21st Army (Wehrmacht)
- 21st Army Group - a World War II British army group, consisting mainly of British and Commonwealth troops

== See also ==
- Lists of armies
- List of countries by number of military and paramilitary personnel
