= Rifle Company Butterworth =

Australian Army infantry company

Rifle Company Butterworth is an Australian Army infantry company based at RMAF Base Butterworth in Butterworth, Penang, Malaysia. Rifle Company Butterworth was established in 1970 to provide a protective and quick-reaction force for RAAF Base Butterworth during a resurgence of the Communist insurgency in Malaysia. While RAAF Base Butterworth was handed to the Royal Malaysian Air Force in 1988 and the insurgency officially ended in 1989, Rifle Company Butterworth has been maintained as a means of providing Australian soldiers with training in jungle warfare and cross-training with the Malaysian Army. The company is staffed on a rotational basis, with both Regular and Reserve personnel being deployed quarterly.

== See also ==
- Communist insurgency in Malaysia (1968–1989)
- Communist insurgency in Sarawak
- Malayan Emergency (1948–1960)
- Operation Gateway
