= 19th Brigade =

19th Brigade may refer to:

== Australia ==
- 19th Brigade (Australia)

== Belarus ==
- 19th Guards Mechanized Brigade

== Hungary ==
- 19th Infantry Brigade (Hungary)

== India ==
- 19th (Dehra Dun) Brigade
- 19th Indian Infantry Brigade

== Soviet Union ==
- 19th Mechanized Brigade (Soviet Union, 1934-1938)
- 19th Guards Mechanized Brigade

== Sweden ==
- Norrbotten Brigade, also known as the 19th Arctic Mechanised Brigade

== Ukraine ==
- 19th Missile Brigade
- 19th Radio Intercept Brigade

== United Kingdom ==
- 19th Light Brigade, an infantry brigade
- 19th Mounted Brigade
- 19th Reserve Brigade

=== Artillery Brigades ===
- 19th Brigade Royal Field Artillery
- XIX Brigade, Royal Horse Artillery (T.F.)

== See also ==
- 19th Army (disambiguation)
- 19th Division (disambiguation)
- 19th Regiment (disambiguation)
- 19th Battalion (disambiguation)
- 19th Group (disambiguation)
- 19 Squadron (disambiguation)
