= 19th Battalion =

19th Battalion may refer to:

- 19th Battalion (Australia), a World War I ANZAC battalion
- 2/19th Battalion (Australia), a World War II Australian infantry battalion
- 19th Battalion (New Zealand), a World War II infantry battalion
- 19th (Central Ontario) Battalion, CEF, a World War I battalion for the Canadian Corps
- 19th Battalion (United States Marine Corps), a battalion in the Fleet Marine Corps Reserve
- 1st/19th Battalion, Royal New South Wales Regiment, a unit of the Australian Army Reserve

== See also ==
- 19th Corps (disambiguation)
- 19th Division (disambiguation)
- 19th Brigade (disambiguation)
- 19th Regiment (disambiguation)
- 19th Group (disambiguation)
- 19th Squadron (disambiguation)
