= 19th Regiment =

19th Regiment or 19th Infantry Regiment may refer to:

== Infantry regiments ==
- Green Howards (19th Regiment of Foot), a unit of the British Army
- Kumaon Regiment (19th Hyderabad Regiment), a unit of the British India and Indian Armies
- Norrbottens regemente (19th Regiment, Sweden), one of two Swedish regiments to bear this designation
- Västerbottens regemente (19th Regiment, Sweden), one of two Swedish regiments to bear this designation
- 19th Infantry Regiment (United States), a unit of the United States Army

== Cavalry regiments ==
- 4th/19th Prince of Wales's Light Horse, a unit of the Australian Army
- 19th King George's Own Lancers, a unit of the British Indian Army
- 19th Alberta Dragoons, a unit of the Canadian Army
- 19th Light Dragoons, a unit of the British Army
- 19th Royal Hussars, a unit of the British Army
- 15th/19th The King's Royal Hussars, a unit of the British Army

== Artillery regiments ==
- 19th Regiment Royal Artillery, a unit of the British Army

== Aviation regiments ==
- Flying Regiment 19, Finnish Air Force, a unit of the Finnish Air Force

== American Civil War regiments ==
- 19th Regiment Alabama Infantry, a unit of the Confederate (South) Army
- 19th Tennessee Infantry Regiment, a unit of the Confederate (South) Army
- 19th Illinois Volunteer Infantry Regiment, a unit of the Union (North) Army
- 19th Indiana Volunteer Infantry Regiment, a unit of the Union (North) Army
- 19th Iowa Volunteer Infantry Regiment, a unit of the Union (North) Army
- 19th Maine Volunteer Infantry Regiment, a unit of the Union (North) Army
- 19th Michigan Volunteer Infantry Regiment, a unit of the Union (North) Army
- 19th Wisconsin Volunteer Infantry Regiment, a unit of the Union (North) Army
- 19th United States Colored Infantry Regiment, a unit of the Union (North) Army

== See also ==
- 19th Corps (disambiguation)
- 19th Division (disambiguation)
- 19th Brigade (disambiguation)
- 19th Group (disambiguation)
- 19th Battalion (disambiguation)
- 19th Squadron (disambiguation)
