= Battle of Benghazi (1911) =

Part of the Italo-Turkish War

The Battle of Benghazi (1911)
- Part of The Italo-Turkish War
Date	20 October 1911 – 18 October 1912
Location	Benghazi, Ottoman Tripolitania (now Libya) 32°07′14.33″N 20°05′10.21″E
Result	Italian victory

Belligerents
Kingdom of Italy	Ottoman Empire; Senussi Order

Commanders and leaders
Admiral Augusto Aubry; General Ottavio Briccola; General Giovanni Ameglio; General Raynaldo D'Amico	Chakir Bey; Aziz Ali Bey El-Masri

Strength
Initial: 15,000; At Peak: 22,000	Initial: 2,900; At Peak: 20,000

Casualties and losses
(Kingdom of Italy) 58 dead and 193 wounded	(Ottoman Empire) Around 1,150 killed and captured

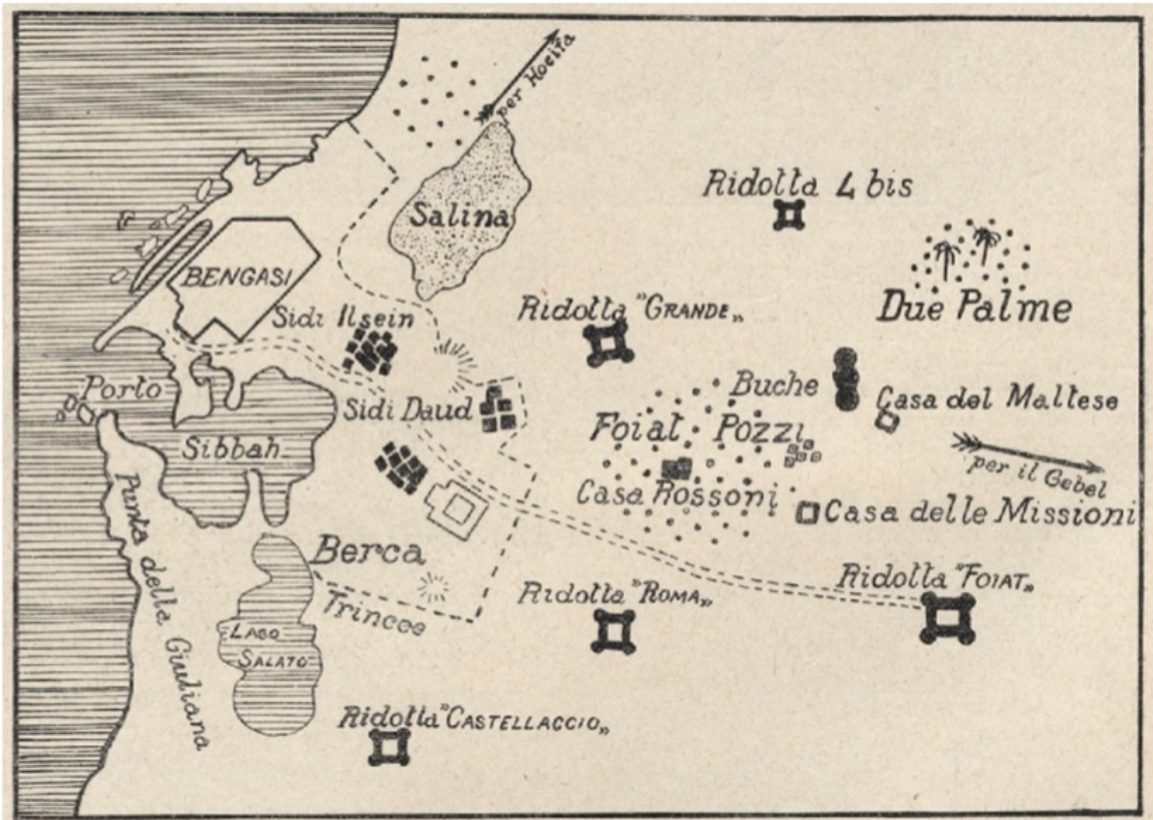
Map of Benghazi illustrating the defensive redoubts (ridotta) and the major places where fighting occurred

The Battle of Benghazi occurred during the Italo-Turkish War when the Kingdom of Italy attacked and took possession of the major cities of the Ottoman Empire's North African Tripolitania province, now Libya. Benghazi was one of the five strategic cities captured and held by the Italians during the entire length of the war.

== Background ==
In 1911 as a part of its colonial plans for Africa, Italy lusted after the Ottoman Empire’s Tripolitania province. On 28 September 1911, the Italian Chargé d'Affaires presented the Turkish government in Constantinople with an ultimatum demanding that the Ottoman Empire consent to the military occupation of its North African province of Tripolitania by Italy within 24 hours. As its justification, Italy used the unfounded claim that the action was necessary to end the disorder and neglect of the territory. The Ottoman Empire refused and on 29 September 1911, the Italian government declared war on Turkey.

At that time, Tripolitania was largely a barren land with a total population of approximately 1.5 million inhabitants composed largely of nomadic Arab Bedouin tribes. The Ottoman Empire had ruled the territory with a light hand as an autonomous province since 1835. When Italy declared war on the Ottoman Empire, Tripolitania was defended by Turkish forces totaling only 7,000 men in antiquated, second-rate forts in the cities along the coast of the Mediterranean Sea. As such, the Italians expected that a show of force might be enough to cause the Turks to seek to avoid war by means of a diplomatic solution. To that end, the Italian plan was to capture and occupy the major cities along the Mediterranean, namely Tripoli, Tobruk, Derna, Benghazi, and Homs.

Some military minds, however, recognized that the real defense of Tripolitania would come from the native populations in the interior organized by Sheik Sidi-es-Senoussi, the leader of the Senussi order. The Senussi order began as an Islamic missionary program founded in Mecca in 1837. By the beginning of the twentieth century, the Senussi in Tripolitania had grown to hold a leadership role among the Bedouin tribes. And by the beginning of the Italo-Turkish War, the Senussi had begun to organize military resistance against colonialists. In Tripolitania during the Ottoman rule, the Senussi had accepted the Turks as their ruler and the Ottoman Sultan as their Caliph contingent upon being given their autonomy. The attitude with respect to Italian colonialists, however, was different. Due largely to Islamic sentiment and propaganda, the native population of Tripolitania was bitterly opposed to the Italians.

Immediately following the declaration of war, the Italian Navy established a blockade of 700 nautical miles along the shores of Tripolitania and took command of the eastern Mediterranean in order to transport an expeditionary force to the African coast. The first city targeted for invasion was Tripoli, where the Turkish garrison quickly evacuated the city with the exception of 150 men manning the artillery of the five coastal forts. The remainder of the Turkish forces withdrew to the safety of the village of Gharian in the hills, a two day march south. On 30 September, the Italians demanded that the Turks surrender the city by the 2nd of October. Three days later when no response was received from the Turks, the Italians began a bombardment of the Turkish forts. After eight hours of bombardment spanning two days, the Turks evacuated the forts and withdrew south of the city. On 5 October, the Italians landed a force of 1,200 men and claimed the city.

After the capture of Tripoli, the cities of Tobruk, Derna, and Homs were attacked and captured in succession, leaving only Benghazi, the second largest garrison among the five cities, to be attacked. Beginning on 13 October, the Italians began to move the 15,000 men of the 2nd Infantry Division to Benghazi. The first group of Italian soldiers began to arrive off shore at Benghazi on 18 October. Shortly thereafter, Italian Admiral Augusto Aubry demanded that the Turkish force of 400 regular and 2,500 irregular troops surrender the city. The Turkish commander of the garrison, Chakir Bey refused.

== Amphibious landing at Benghazi ==
On the morning of 19 October, the Italian Navy off shore of Benghazi began the bombardment of the city. Bombarded were Juliana Beach where the Italians intended to land; the Turkish barracks at Berca, approximately three miles southeast of the city; the Berca fortress and nearby Governor's residence; and the Turkish armory north of the town. Simultaneously, 800 Italian marines landed on Guiliana Beach unopposed and established an artillery battery on the high ground of the Cape. The landing on Juliana Beach surprised the Turks. Most of the Turkish infantry was deployed either north toward the armory or south of town away from the shore. The Turks quickly counter-attacked the Italians taking a position on a narrow strip of ground south of the town between Buscaiba Point on the shore and a salt lake to the east. From this point, the Turks attempted to retake Juliana Beach and the high ground at the Cape. The counter-attack, however, was forcefully repelled by Italian naval gunfire. During that time, a second Italian landing party attempted to capture the custom house wharf, but was repelled by heavy Turkish rifle fire. After withdrawing from the custom house wharf, the Italians proceeded to demolish the area by means of a bombardment from their warships.

After the Italian marines had turned back the Turks at Juliana Beach, they secured the area and began to build piers to allow the infantry to disembark from the transport ships. At 10:00 am, General Giovanni Ameglio led the first of the infantry ashore, took command of the operation, and had the marines move inland. As the marines moved south, they came upon a concentration of Turks in the narrow passageway near Buscaiba Point and were unable to continue their advance. In the afternoon, General Ottavio Briccola, the commander of the 2nd Infantry Division arrived on shore with soldiers of the 4th and 63rd Infantry Regiments who reinforced the marines and were ultimately able to dislodge the Turks. General Briccola then proceeded to advance on and attack Berca from two directions supported by bombardments from the Italian warships. In the little town of Sidi Daub the fighting was house-to-house. As evening began to fall, the Turks abandoned Berca and retreated north into the southern neighborhoods of Benghazi. Rather than pursue the Turks into Benghazi, the Italians held their positions and continued to bring men ashore.

At 7:00 pm, the Italian Navy bombarded the European quarter in the southern part of Benghazi after receiving numerous urgent appeals from General Briccola. After 20 minutes of bombardment, the Turks raised the white flag and began a general retreat out of Benghazi. When the Italians took possession of Benghazi on the morning of 20 October they encountered no resistance in the urban areas.

== Occupation of Benghazi ==
Immediately after capturing Benghazi, the Italians chose not to continue the battle by pursuing the Turks, but rather to remain in the environs of the city taking a defensive position. Likewise, the heavily outnumbered Turks were content to flee the city and take refuge 20 miles to the east in the hills at Bu Marian. Neither force mounted an immediate attack on the other. The Italians used the time to bring their entire force ashore and to begin the construction of defensive redoubts, an airstrip, and a military field railroad. The Turks used the time to call upon their Bedouin allies and assemble reinforcements. Although there were frequent skirmishes in the first few weeks after the Italian invasion, neither side mounted a full-fledged attack on the other. The Italians were hesitant to extend themselves into the interior and the Turkish-Arab forces, at least initially, did not have the means to attack and overcome the Italian defensive fortifications and naval artillery.

By the middle of November, however, the Turkish-Arab force had grown to approximately 15,000 men under the command of Aziz Ali bey El-Masri. In an attempt to unnerve the Italians and cause them to waste their ammunition, El-Masri and his forces began to make “simulated nocturnal attacks” on the Italians.

El-Masri then began to make frequent daylight and night attacks on the Italian garrison in the southern suburbs of Benghazi. The Italians at the garrison were supported by the naval gunfire of the San Marco and the Agordat and easily fended off the attacks. The Italians rarely reacted by responding with sorties. One exception to the rule occurred on 28 November when Italian reconnaissance revealed that there was a substantial Turkish-Arab force 6-9 miles north-east of Benghazi at the oasis of al-Kuwayfiya. Because the oasis was close to the sea shore, Major-General Raynaldo de’Amico was given the command to lead the 3rd Infantry Brigade to the oasis to attack the enemy. At al-Kuwayfiya, the Italians came upon a large Turkish-Arab force where a skirmish took place. Results of the conflict were ultimately disputed with each side claiming that they forced the other side to withdraw. The Italians claimed that they left 21 Bedouins dead on the field while the Turks claimed that they killed 22 and wounded 50.

Otherwise, conventional attacks by the Turkish-Arab forces continued. On 30 November, a Turkish-Arab force of 20,000 men was repulsed with substantial losses. To protect against further attacks, the Italians reinforced the garrison with the 57th Regiment from Italy and by bringing the battleship Regina Elina to Benghazi from Tobruk.

The Turkish-Arab forces attacked during the night of 10-11 December and again during the night of 14-15 December, but were repulsed with the aid of bombardment from the Italian warships. The Italians responded by bringing more soldiers to Tripolitania and by the end of December the number of soldiers in Benghazi exceeded 22,000. As the year ended, the entire war including the battle for Benghazi seemed to be a stalemate. The Italians continued to stay in their defensive coastal fortifications protected by their naval firepower while the Turkish-Arab forces attacked without success.

== 1912 in Benghazi ==
As the war continued in 1912, the Bedouins increased their war effort when Sheik Sidi-es-Senoussi, the leader of the Senussi, convinced the tribal chiefs to declare a jihad against the Italians. Meanwhile, the Italians at Benghazi began to extend their defensive perimeter. New, stronger fortifications were built as far as 4½ miles from the city, a distance still within the range of the Italian warships in the harbor. The fortifications were equipped with heavy 6-inch siege guns and linked by means of the field railroad. The new fortifications quickly became subject to numerous attacks as the Turkish-Arab forces continued in their futile effort to prosecute the war.

The Turkish-Arab attacks continued into March and once again the Italians went on the offensive against a concentration of Arabs at an oasis near Fojat. On 12 March, in a battle which became known as La battaglia delle Due Palme (the Battle of Two Palms), Italian General Ameglio led a force of seven battalions with cavalry and artillery to the oasis and won a great victory. The Arabs suffered casualties of 400 men killed and 500 men captured. The Italians reported casualties of 29 killed and 62 wounded. For his leadership, General Ameglio was recognized and promoted to Lieutenant-General.

== Peace ==
After a relatively quiet month of April, the Italians changed their tactics pertaining to the overall war and used their navy in May to attack the Ottoman Empire’s province of Rhodes in the Aegean Sea. In this effort, the Italians successfully captured the island of Rhodes and the Dodecanese Islands. After these losses, the war and the fighting effectively came to a halt. On 13 August, Italy and the Ottoman Empire began peace talks.

At the outset, the peace talks between the Italians and the Turks went so well that in September the Turks dispersed an assembled army ordering the regular soldiers back to their quarters and sending the reserves home. As the talks lagged and became delayed, however, the geopolitical situation for the Ottoman Empire changed and the need to formally end the war became more urgent. Observing the struggles of the Ottoman Empire in the Italo-Turkish War, the Balkan states of Montenegro, Bulgaria, Serbia, and Greece formed the Balkan League and declared war on Turkey in an attempt to reclaim territory in Eastern Europe. Montenegro declared war on the Ottoman Empire on 8 October. Bulgaria, Serbia and Greece would follow Montenegro's lead and declare war on the Ottoman Empire on 18 October

Given the burden of a pending war in the Balkans, the plenipotentiaries from Italy and Turkey quickly wrapped up the negotiations and signed a preliminary Treaty of Peace in Lausanne, Switzerland on 15 October. The final draft of the treaty which has come to be known as the Treaty of Ouchy was signed on 18 October 1912

== Aftermath ==
The major provisions of the Treaty of Ouchy provided that all hostilities were to be ended and the Ottoman Empire was to immediately recall its officers, troops, and civil functionaries. Full amnesty for all hostile acts was granted, common law crimes excepted. Italy was to withdraw their forces from the Aegean Islands. The Ottoman Empire was to grant autonomy to Tripolitania and Cyrenaica.

With these provisions, Italy was free to continue its occupation of Tripolitania. As a part of its plan to exercise sovereignty over the territory, Italy stated that it would recognized Turkey's Sultan’s as the religious authority in Tripolitania. In addition, Italy stated that the inhabitants of Tripolitania would be permitted to enjoy complete liberty in the Mahommedan religion as in the past with the name of the Sultan pronounced in public prayers and his personal representative recognized. Finally, two commissions, one for Tripoli and one for Cyrenaica, were established to confer with the Arab chieftains to persuade them to submit to Italian sovereignty.
