= Maurician medal =

Maurician Medal
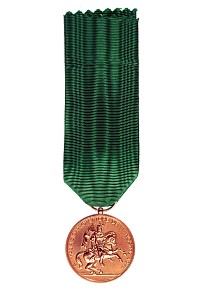
- Awarded for: 50 Years in the Italian Armed Forces
- Country: Italy
- Presented by: President of Italy
- Eligibility: Military officers
- Status: Currently awarded
- Established: July 19, 1839
- Service ribbon

The Maurician medal is an honorary degree granted to a member of the Italian Armed Forces after 50 years of service. The commanding years are added afterward.

The medal was established by Charles Albert of Sardinia as Grand Master of the Order of Saints Maurice and Lazarus by a letters patent on 19 July 1839 under the name "Maurician Medal to the Military Merit of Ten Lustrums". It was awarded to knights of the named order who have served in the armed forces of the Kingdom of Sardinia, later the Kingdom of Italy.

It was further regulated with royal decree of 21 December 1924 and detached from the Order of Saints Maurice and Lazarus after World War II.

The "Maurician Medal to the Military Merit of Ten Lustrums" was replaced, by Law Number 203 of 7 May 1954 (modified by Law Number 1327 of 8 November 1956), with the "Maurician Medal to the Merit of Ten Lustrums of Military Career." Since then, the Maurician medal is granted on decree of the President of the Italian Republic, after 50 years of military career (not military service).

Officers and non-commissioned officers of the Carabinieri, Italian Army, the Italian Air Force, and the Italian Navy, customs officers of the Guardia di Finanza, and personnel of the Italian Police forces can receive the medal. General officers and flag officers receive a medal with a diameter of 52 millimeters (2 inches), while other recipients receive a medal with a diameter of 32 millimeters (1¼ inches).

The medal also can be granted by decree of the President of Italy, at the suggestion of the minister of defense, to any other member of the Italian armed forces, as well as to personnel subordinate to the minister of interior and the minister of finance.

== Notable recipients ==
- Biagio Abrate
- Luigi Agliardi
- Giovanni Ameglio
- Marcello Amero D'Aste
- Giacomo Appiotti
- Aldo Aymonino
- Pietro Badoglio
- Federico Baistrocchi
- Fiorenzo Bava Beccaris
- Giuseppe Bernardis
- Gino Birindelli
- Guido Biscaretti di Ruffia
- Cesare Bonelli
- Luigi Bongiovanni
- Ugo Brusati
- Giovanni Bruzzo
- Ernesto Burzagli
- Felice Napoleone Canevaro
- Eugenio Henke
- Guglielmo Nasi
- Giampaolo Di Paola
- Alessandro Asinari di San Marzano

== Bibliography ==
- Giovanni Santi-Mazzini, Militaria - Storia delle potenze europee da Carlo Magno al 1914 ( History of great European governments from Carlo Magno to 1914 ), Milano, Mondadori, 2005, ISBN 88-370-3324-9
