= Camillo Candiani =

Italian admiral

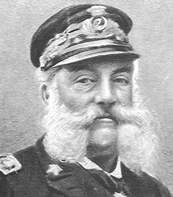

Member of the Senate
- In office 16 April 1902 – 9 February 1919
- Monarch: Victor Emmanuel III

Personal details
- Born: 11 October 1841 Olivola, Italy
- Died: 9 February 1919 (aged 77) Olivola, Italy

Military service
- Allegiance: Kingdom of Sardinia (1850?–1861); Kingdom of Italy (1861–1910)
- Branch/service: Royal Sardinian Navy (1850?–1861); Italian Regia Marina ("Royal Navy") (1861–1910)
- Years of service: 1850?–1910
- Rank: Vice admiral
- Commands: La Spezia Arsenal; La Maddalena naval base; Oceanic Naval Force
- Battles/wars: Boxer Rebellion

Camillo Candiani, Count of Olivola, Lord of Montù de' Gabbi (11 October 1841, Olivola, – 9 February 1919, Olivola), was an Italian admiral, diplomat, and politician. He is best known for his command of Italian forces during the Boxer Rebellion in 1900, and he also served as a Senator of the Kingdom of Italy.

== Biography ==
Born in Olivola in what was then the Kingdom of Sardinia, Candiani was admitted to the Sardinian naval school by royal concession at just nine years of age. He embarked aboard ship for the first time in 1856 aboard the Royal Sardinian Navy aviso Aquila and was promoted to guardiamarina ("ensign") in 1860. Italy unified in 1861, creating the Kingdom of Italy, and Candiani continued his career as a member of the new Italian Regia Marina ("Royal Navy").

Candiani's career took place mainly in the field of military diplomacy. In September 1866 he went on a diplomatic mission to Peking (now Beijing) in China, during which he completed one of the first challenging tests in international politics of the newly formed Kingdom of Italy.

In 1868, Candiani completed a circumnavigation of the globe aboard the frigates Regina and Margherita. He became a member of the Italian Geographic Society that year. Appointed deputy director of artillery in Genoa and professor at the Royal Navy School, he carried out important studies in naval technique, which in 1869 culminated in the improvement of advanced equipment suitable for suspending and transferring artillery on board ships.

Aboard the steam frigate Giuseppe Garibaldi, Candiani circumnavigated the globe again as admiral and aide-de-camp to Prince Tommaso, Duke of Genoa, departing Naples on 16 November 1872. During the 708-day voyage, the ship called at Gibraltar, Rio de Janeiro, Melbourne, the Fiji Islands, Yokohama, Honolulu, San Francisco, Acapulco, Puerto San José (in Guatemala), Amapala (in Honduras), Puntarenas (in Costa Rica), Valparaíso, Montevideo, and Tangier before returning to Italy at La Spezia on 22 October 1874.

After a long period spent aboard the most modern ships of the Regia Marina, Candiani was appointed to the prestigious position of naval attaché to the United Kingdom in London in August 1886, remaining in that position until 1889. From 21 April 1895 to 23 January 1898 he was director of the La Spezia Arsenal in La Spezia. He then moved on to command of the naval base at La Maddalena on Sardinia.

In 1900, as a vice ammiraglio ("vice admiral"), Candiani led the Italian contingent of the international force sent by the Eight-Nation Alliance to suppress the Boxer Rebellion in China. With the protected cruiser Ettore Fieramosca as his flagship, he commanded the Regia Marina′s Oceanic Naval Force, which also included the armored cruiser Vettor Pisani, protected cruisers Vesuvio and Stromboli, and corvette Cristoforo Colombo. He oversaw the transportation of the Italian Expeditionary Corps in China under Colonnello ("Colonel") Vincenzo Garioni, a force of over 2,000 Italian soldiers which in late August 1900 joined the forces of Austria-Hungary, the British Empire, France, the German Empire, the Japanese Empire, the Russian Empire, and the United States ashore in occupying Peking, where the multinational force had lifted the 55-day siege of the International Legations by the Boxers in mid-August 1900. Candiani became the supreme naval commander on land, and the alliance's victory over the Boxers led to Italy gaining control of the Italian concession of Tientsin (now Tianjin) in 1901.

Candiani's role in the defeat of the Boxers brought him great fame, and high honors were bestowed on him upon his return to Italy. He was nominated for a lifetime appointment as a senator of the Kingdom of Italy in November 1901, and took office as a senator on 16 April 1902. As a senator, he was member of the Finance Commission, and later of the commission for evaluating the laws of the Military Penal Code, the Code of Procedures of the Military Penal Code, and the Judicial Military Law. He was also Commissioner of the Supervisory Committee of the Fund for Emigration.

Candiani retired from the navy in 1910, and died at Olivola without heirs on 9 February 1919.

== Honors and awards ==
=== Italian ===
==== Civil ====
- Knight of the Order of Saints Maurice and Lazarus
- Officer of the Order of Saints Maurice and Lazarus
- Commander of the Order of Saints Maurice and Lazarus
- Grand Officer of the Order of Saints Maurice and Lazarus
- Grand Officer of the Order of the Crown of Italy

==== Military ====
- Officer of the Military Order of Savoy
- Commemorative Medal of the Campaign in China (1900–1901)
- Cross for Length of Military Service (40 years)

=== Foreign ===
- Knight of the Military Order of Christ (Kingdom of Portugal)
