= Domenico Siciliani =

Italian general

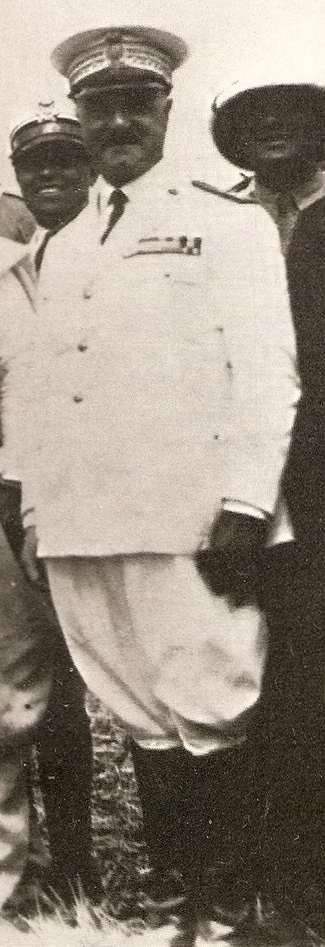

Italian Vice-Governor of Cyrenaica
- In office 24 January 1929 – March 1930
- Governor: Pietro Badoglio
- Preceded by: Attilio Teruzzi (governor)
- Succeeded by: Rodolfo Graziani

Personal details
- Born: 1 May 1879 Cirò
- Died: 6 May 1938 (aged 59) Rome

Domenico Siciliani (1 May 1879 – 6 May 1938) was an Italian general. He was the deputy governor of Cyrenaica (January 1929-March 1930) representing Pietro Badoglio, who had become the unique governor of Tripolitania and Cyrenaica since 24 January 1929.
