= Invasion of Russia =

Invasion of Russia can refer to:

- Mongol invasion of Kievan Rus' (1237–1242), a series of invasions that resulted in the Rus' states becoming vassals of the Golden Horde.
- Livonian campaign against Rus' (1240–1242), an unsuccessful Teutonic invasion of the Novgorod and Pskov Republics, in order to convert them to Catholicism.
- Crimean invasion of Russia (1521), a successful invasion of Muscovy was led by Mehmed I Giray of the Crimean Khanate, a vassal of the Ottoman Empire.
- Russo-Crimean Wars (1570–1572), an Ottoman invasion that penetrated Russia and destroyed Moscow.
- Polish–Muscovite War (1609–1618), Poland gained Severia and Smolensk.
- Ingrian War (1610–1617), a Swedish invasion which captured Novgorod and Pskov.
- Swedish invasion of Russia (1708–1709), an unsuccessful Swedish invasion, as part of the Great Northern War (1700–1721).
- French invasion of Russia (1812), an unsuccessful invasion by Napoleon's French Empire and its allies, as part of the Napoleonic Wars (1803–1815).
- Crimean War (1853–1856), a series of conflicts between the Ottoman Empire, the British Empire, the French Empire, Sardinia, and the Russian Empire, including an Allied invasion of the Crimean Peninsula.
- Japanese invasion of Sakhalin (1905), an invasion and annexation by the Japanese, as part of the Russo-Japanese War (1904–1905).
- Eastern Front (World War I) (1914–1918), a theatre of World War I fought between the Central Powers (mainly the German Empire and Austria-Hungary) and the Allied Powers (mainly the Russian Empire and the Kingdom of Romania).
- Allied intervention in the Russian Civil War (1918–1925) and the contemporaneous Polish–Soviet War (1918/9–1921), the Polish occupation of Belarus and West Ukraine.
- Japanese intervention in Siberia (1918–1922), an occupation of the Russian Far East by Japanese soldiers during the Russian Civil War (1917–1923).
- Operation Barbarossa (1941), an unsuccessful invasion of the Soviet Union led by Nazi Germany that started the Eastern Front (World War II) of 1941–1945.
- Continuation War (1941–1944), an unsuccessful German-Finnish invasion of the Soviet Union, as part of World War II.
- Kantokuen (1941), an aborted plan for a major Japanese invasion of the Russian Far East during World War II.
- Operation Unthinkable (1945), a proposed contingency plan for an Anglo-American invasion of the Soviet Union developed by the British Chiefs of Staff during the later stages of World War II.
- War in Dagestan (1999), a repulsed Chechen invasion of Dagestan.
- Kursk campaign (2024–2025), a repulsed invasion of Russia's Kursk Oblast by the Ukrainian Armed Forces (AFU).

== See also ==
- Polish invasion of Russia (disambiguation)
- Russian invasion (disambiguation)
- Soviet invasion (disambiguation)
- Russian Expeditionary Force (disambiguation)
