= Luigi Pintor =

Luigi Pintor may refer to:

- Luigi Pintor (politician, born 1882) (1882–1925), Italian jurist and politician, governor of Cyrenaica
- Luigi Pintor (politician, born 1925) (1925–2003), Italian politician and journalist, member of the Chamber of Deputies
