= List of colonial governors of Italian Cyrenaica =

Governor of Italian Cyrenaica
- Governatore della Cirenaica italiana
- Coat of arms of Italian Cyrenaica

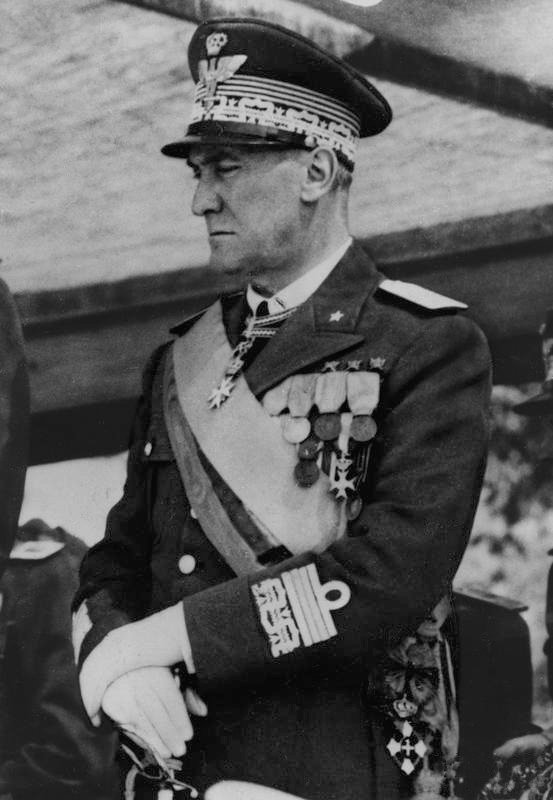
- Longest serving Rodolfo Graziani (as Vice Governor); 15 March 1930 – 31 May 1934
- Reports to: King of Italy; Governor-General of Italian Libya (after 1934)
- Formation: 2 September 1912
- First holder: Ottavio Briccola
- Final holder: Guglielmo Nasi
- Abolished: 1 July 1935
- Succession: Governor-General of Italian Libya

Map of traditional provinces of Libya, with Cyrenaica marked in gray.

This article lists the colonial governors of Italian Cyrenaica from 1912 to 1935. They administered the territory on behalf of the Kingdom of Italy.

== List ==
Complete list of colonial governors of Italian Cyrenaica:

No.	Portrait	Name (Birth–Death)	Term of office		
No.	Portrait	Name (Birth–Death)	Took office	Left office	Time in office
Italian Suzerainty
1	Ottavio Briccola	Lieutenant general Ottavio Briccola (1853–1924)	2 September 1912	9 January 1913	129 days
Italian Cyrenaica Protectorate
1	Ottavio Briccola	Lieutenant general Ottavio Briccola (1853–1924)	9 January 1913	6 November 1913	301 days
–		Lieutenant general Giovanni Ameglio (1854–1921)	6 November 1913	15 July 1915	1 year, 251 days
2		Lieutenant general Giovanni Ameglio (1854–1921)	15 July 1915	8 August 1918	3 years, 24 days
–	Vincenzo Garioni	Lieutenant general Vincenzo Garioni (1856–1929); Acting	8 August 1918	17 May 1919	282 days
Italian Cyrenaica Colony
3	Vincenzo Garioni	Lieutenant general Vincenzo Garioni (1856–1929)	17 May 1919	1 July 1919	45 days
4	Giacomo De Martino	Giacomo De Martino (1849–1921)	1 July 1919	23 November 1921	2 years, 145 days
–	Luigi Pintor	Luigi Pintor (1882–1925); Acting	23 November 1921	30 September 1922	311 days
5	Eduardo Baccari	Eduardo Baccari (1871–1952)	1 October 1922	1 December 1922	61 days
–	Pompeo Gorini [it]	Pompeo Gorini; Acting	1 December 1922	6 June 1923	187 days
6	Luigi Bongiovanni	Lieutenant general Luigi Bongiovanni (1866–1941)	6 June 1923	24 May 1924	353 days
7	Ernesto Mombelli	Major general Ernesto Mombelli (1867–1932)	24 May 1924	22 November 1926	2 years, 182 days
8	Attilio Teruzzi	Lieutenant general Attilio Teruzzi (1882–1950)	23 November 1926	18 December 1928	2 years, 25 days
9	Pietro Badoglio	Marshal; Pietro Badoglio (1871–1956) (Note: Unique Governor of Tripolitania and Cyrenaica after 21 January 1929)	18 December 1928	21 January 1929	34 days
10	Domenico Siciliani	Domenico Siciliani (1879–1938); Vice Governor	21 January 1929	15 March 1930	1 year, 53 days
11	Rodolfo Graziani	Marshal; Rodolfo Graziani (1882–1955); Vice Governor	15 March 1930	31 December 1933	3 years, 291 days
Unification of Italian Tripolitania and Italian Cyrenaica, establishing Italian Libya; 1 January 1934
11	Rodolfo Graziani	Marshal; Rodolfo Graziani (1882–1955); Vice Governor	31 December 1933	31 May 1934	151 days
12	Guglielmo Nasi	Guglielmo Nasi (1879–1971); Vice Governor	1 June 1934	1 July 1935	1 year, 30 days

For continuation after unification, see: List of governors-general of Italian Libya

== See also ==
- Ottoman Tripolitania
  - Pasha of Tripoli
- Italian Libya
  - List of governors-general of Italian Libya
- Italian Tripolitania
  - List of colonial governors of Italian Tripolitania
- Italian Cyrenaica
