= Russian Expeditionary Force =

Russian Expeditionary Force may refer to:

== Expeditionary forces sent by Russia ==
- Russian Expeditionary Force in France; a World War I military expedition of the Russian Empire
  - Russian Legion; the remains of the unit as a volunteer internationalist force after the withdrawal of Russia from WWI

== Expeditionary forces sent to Russia ==
- Allied intervention in the Russian Civil War
  - American Expeditionary Force, North Russia; a World War I military expedition of the United States of America
  - American Expeditionary Force, Siberia; a World War I military expedition of the United States of America
  - Canadian Siberian Expeditionary Force; a World War I military expedition of Canada

== See also ==
- Expeditionary warfare
- Expeditionary Force (disambiguation)
- Russia
- Invasion of Russia (disambiguation)
- Russian invasion (disambiguation)
- Soviet invasion (disambiguation)
