= Candiani =

Candiani is an Italian surname. Notable people with the surname include:

- Alicia Candiani (born 1953), Argentine artist
- Camillo Candiani (1841–1919), Italian admiral and senator of the Kingdom of Italy
- Enrico Candiani (1918–2008), Italian footballer
- Leobardo Candiani (1904–1986), Mexican fencer
- Mauricio Candiani (born 1972), Mexican politician and businessman
