= Melchiade Gabba =

Italian army general (1874–1952)

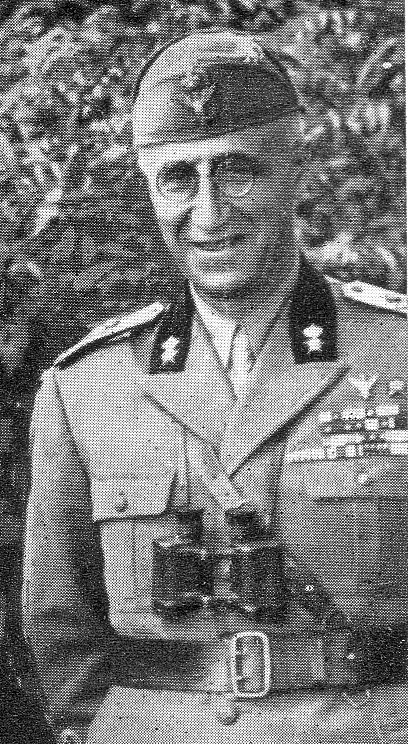
- Born: 20 August 1874; Milan, Kingdom of Italy
- Died: 17 November 1952 (aged 78); Rome, Italy
- Military career
- Allegiance: Kingdom of Italy
- Branch: Royal Italian Army
- Service years: 1895–1940
- Rank: Army General
- Commands: Royal Corps of Colonial Troops of Eritrea; 20th Infantry Division "Curtatone and Montanara"
- Conflicts: World War I; Battles of the Isonzo; Battle of Asiago; Battle of Mount Ortigara; First Battle of the Piave; Second Italo-Ethiopian War; World War II
- Awards: War Merit Cross (twice); Military Order of Savoy; Order of the Crown of Italy; Colonial Order of the Star of Italy; Order of Saints Maurice and Lazarus; Maurician Medal

Melchiade Gabba (20 August 1874 – 17 November 1952) was an Italian general during the Fascist period, who served as commander of the Royal Corps of Colonial Troops of Eritrea and Chief of Staff of the East Africa High Command during the Second Italo-Ethiopian War. From 27 July 1943 to 24 February 1944 he was Minister of Italian Africa of the Badoglio I Cabinet. He was also a Senator of the Kingdom of Italy from 1939 to 1944.

== Biography ==
He was born in Milan on 20 August 1874, the son of Alberto Gabba and Giulia Sozzani, both belonging to the Milanese nobility. On 15 October 1892 he entered the Military College of Milan and then the Royal Academy of Artillery and Engineers of Turin, where he enrolled on 8 August 1895, graduating as artillery second lieutenant. In 1905 he entered the Army War School. From 1911 to December 1915 he was in Eritrea as a staff officer, and then commander of the artillery of the Royal Corps of Colonial Troops. Having returned to Italy in the middle of the First World War, starting from May 1916, with the rank of lieutenant colonel, he served on the Julian front in command of an artillery group of the XVIII Army Corps and later of the XX Army Corps. He was then Chief of Staff of the 13th Division, of the 57th Division, and Head of the Operations and General Affairs Office of the Chief of Staff of the Royal Italian Army, General Luigi Cadorna. He later held the role of Chief of Staff of the XXIX Army Corps, of the XIV Corps and Chief of Staff of the territorial military division of Chieti. For his role in the battle of Asiago (where he was wounded in June 1916) and in the battle of Mount Ortigara he was awarded the Knight's Cross of the Military Order of Savoy, and for that in the First Battle of the Piave the Officer's Cross of the same order.

After the war, in 1919, he became a member of the Italian Geographic Society, perfecting himself in military cartography. After promotion to colonel, he was head of a military mission in Transcaucasia, and then held the position of director of the Royal political agency of the Kingdom of Italy in the republics of Georgia, Azerbaijan and Armenia from 28 February 1920 to 16 March 1922. Upon returning to Italy he was in succession Chief of Staff of the III Corps of Milan, Chief of Operations Office at the Army General Staff, and Secretary of the Council of the Army (1921). In September 1921 he returned to Eritrea as commander of the local Royal Corps of Colonial Troops.

Promoted to brigadier general in May 1926, in 1927 he was appointed Chief of Staff of the designated army command of Florence. In January 1931 he was promoted to major general, and became Commander of the 20th Infantry Division "Curtatone and Montanara". He then served as aide-de-camp to the Prince of Piedmont from 17 November 1932 to 25 May 1934. In 1934 he enrolled in the National Fascist Party, and in November of the same year he was promoted to the rank of lieutenant general. From March 1935 he took part in the war in Ethiopia as Chief of Staff of the East Africa High Command, headed by General Emilio De Bono.

On 25 March 1939 he was appointed Senator of the Kingdom of Italy on the proposal of the Minister of War, and became a member of the Senatorial Commission for Italian African Affairs (and its president from 1941) and of the Commission for the judgment of the High Court of Justice. In May 1940 he was promoted to army general, and two months later he retired from active service due to reaching age limits. On 27 July 1943 he was appointed Minister of Italian Africa by Pietro Badoglio (even though Italy had lost all of its African colonies by the spring of 1943), a position he held until 24 February 1944 when this ministry was taken on ad interim by Badoglio himself. In October 1944 he was dismissed from his post as Senator by the High Court for Sanctions against Fascism. He retired to private life after the establishment of the Italian Republic, and died in Rome on 17 November 1952.
