= Expeditionary Force =

Expeditionary Force may refer to:

- Expeditionary warfare, a military force dispatched to fight in a foreign country
- Expeditionary Force, a science fiction book series by Craig Alanson

Military formations with Expeditionary Force or the generally synonymous Expeditionary Corps in their name include:

- American Expeditionary Forces: to France (1917–1919)
- American North Russia Expeditionary Force (1918–1919)
- Australian Naval and Military Expeditionary Force: To German New Guinea (1914)
- First Australian Imperial Force: (1914–1919)
- Second Australian Imperial Force: (1939–1945)
- Brazilian Expeditionary Force: to Italy (1943–1945)
- British Expeditionary Force (World War I): to France and Belgium (1914–1918)
- British Expeditionary Force (World War II): to France and Belgium (1939–1940)
- Canadian Expeditionary Force: to France and Belgium (1914–1920)
- Chilean Expeditionary Force in War of the Pacific (1879–1883)
- Chinese Expeditionary Force: to Burma and India (1942–1945)
- Combined Joint Expeditionary Force (2010–present)
- Corps expeditionnaire d'Orient: to Gallipoli (1915–1916)
- Egyptian Expeditionary Force: British in Egypt, Sinai and Palestine Campaign (1916–1919)
- French Far East Expeditionary Corps: to French Indochina (1945–1956)
- Greek Expeditionary Force to Korea (1950–1958)
- Indian Expeditionary Force (1914–1918)
- Italian Expeditionary Force: French and British in Italy (1917–1918)
- Italian Expeditionary Corps in China (1900–1905)
- Italian Expeditionary Corps in Russia (1941–1945)
- Japanese Expeditionary Force to China (1939–1945)
- Marine Expeditionary Force
- Mediterranean Expeditionary Force (1915–1916)
- New Zealand Expeditionary Force (1914–1918) and (1940–1945)
  - Samoan Expeditionary Force from New Zealand in World War I
- Ottoman Hejaz Expeditionary Force (1916–1919)
- Ottoman 1st Expeditionary Force (1914–1915)
- Ottoman 5th Expeditionary Force (1914–1915)
- Philippine Expeditionary Forces to Korea (1950–1955)
- Portuguese Expeditionary Corps: to France and Belgium (1917–1918)
- Russian Expeditionary Force in France (1916–1918)
- The UK-led Joint Expeditionary Force (2010–)
- Kuwaiti Expeditionary Force Arab-Israeli war (1967–1973)
