= Russian invasion of Finland =

The Russian invasion of Finland may refer to:

- Russo-Swedish War (1495–1497)
- Finnish War (1808–1809)
- Winter War (1939–1940)
- Continuation War (1941–1944)

== See also ==
- Russian invasion (disambiguation)
- List of wars between Russia and Sweden
