= Soviet invasion of Romania =

Soviet invasion of Romania can refer to:

- Soviet occupation of Bessarabia and Northern Bukovina (1940)
- Battle of Romania (1944) and the subsequent Soviet occupation of Romania

== See also ==
- Soviet invasion (disambiguation)
