= Aldo Aymonino =

- Born: 20 April 1880; Naples, Kingdom of Italy
- Died: 16 January 1946 (aged 65); Rome, Kingdom of Italy
- Military career
- Allegiance: Kingdom of Italy
- Branch: Royal Italian Army; Guardia di Finanza
- Service years: 1899–1945
- Rank: Lieutenant General
- Commands: Regiment "Savoia Cavalleria" (3rd); 3rd Cavalry Command; Military Division of Trieste; 2nd Cavalry Division "Emanuele Filiberto Testa di Ferro"; Army Corps of Florence; VII Corps; Guardia di Finanza
- Conflicts: Italo-Turkish War; World War I; Battles of the Isonzo; World War II
- Awards: Bronze Medal of Military Valor; Order of the Crown of Italy; Order of Saints Maurice and Lazarus; Colonial Order of the Star of Italy; Maurician Medal

Aldo Aymonino (Naples, 20 April 1880 – Rome, 16 January 1946) was an Italian general during World War II. He was the eleventh commander-general of the Guardia di Finanza, from 1941 to 1945.

== Biography ==
Born to Carlo Aymonino and Matilde Stefani, Aldo Aymonino began his military career in 1899, in the Lancers of Novara Regiment. After attending the Army War School, he served as a staff officer in the IX Corps and at the Military Division of Milan. He then participated in the Italo-Turkish War and in the First World War, during which he initially served in the 4th Cavalry Division, then as deputy Chief of Staff of the IX Army Corps and later at the Supreme Command, earning a Bronze Medal of Military Valor. After promotion to Colonel in 1918, he commanded the "Savoia Cavalleria" Regiment, after which he assumed the position of Chief of Staff of the Army Corps of Rome.

After promotion to Brigadier General in 1927 he held the 3rd Cavalry Command until 1930 and was then head of the Horse and Veterinary Service of the Ministry of War from 1930 to 1932; on 25 February 1932 he was promoted to Major General and from October 1932 to October 1933 he commanded the Military Division of Trieste, and later the 2nd Cavalry Division "Emanuele Filiberto Testa di Ferro" from October 1933 to March 1935, when he was appointed first aide-de-camp to the Prince of Piedmont, Umberto of Savoy. Having been promoted to lieutenant general on 1 January 1936, he held the command of the army corps of Florence from 15 October 1938 to 10 June 1940, when he assumed that of the VII Corps, mobilized for operations against France after Italy's entry into World War II, until 1 September 1940. On 26 January 1941, after a period in service at the Ministry of War for special duties, he assumed command of the Regia Guardia di Finanza, which he held until 12 March 1945. He died in Rome in 1946.
