= Italian Expeditionary Corps in China =

- Corpo di spedizione italiano in Cina
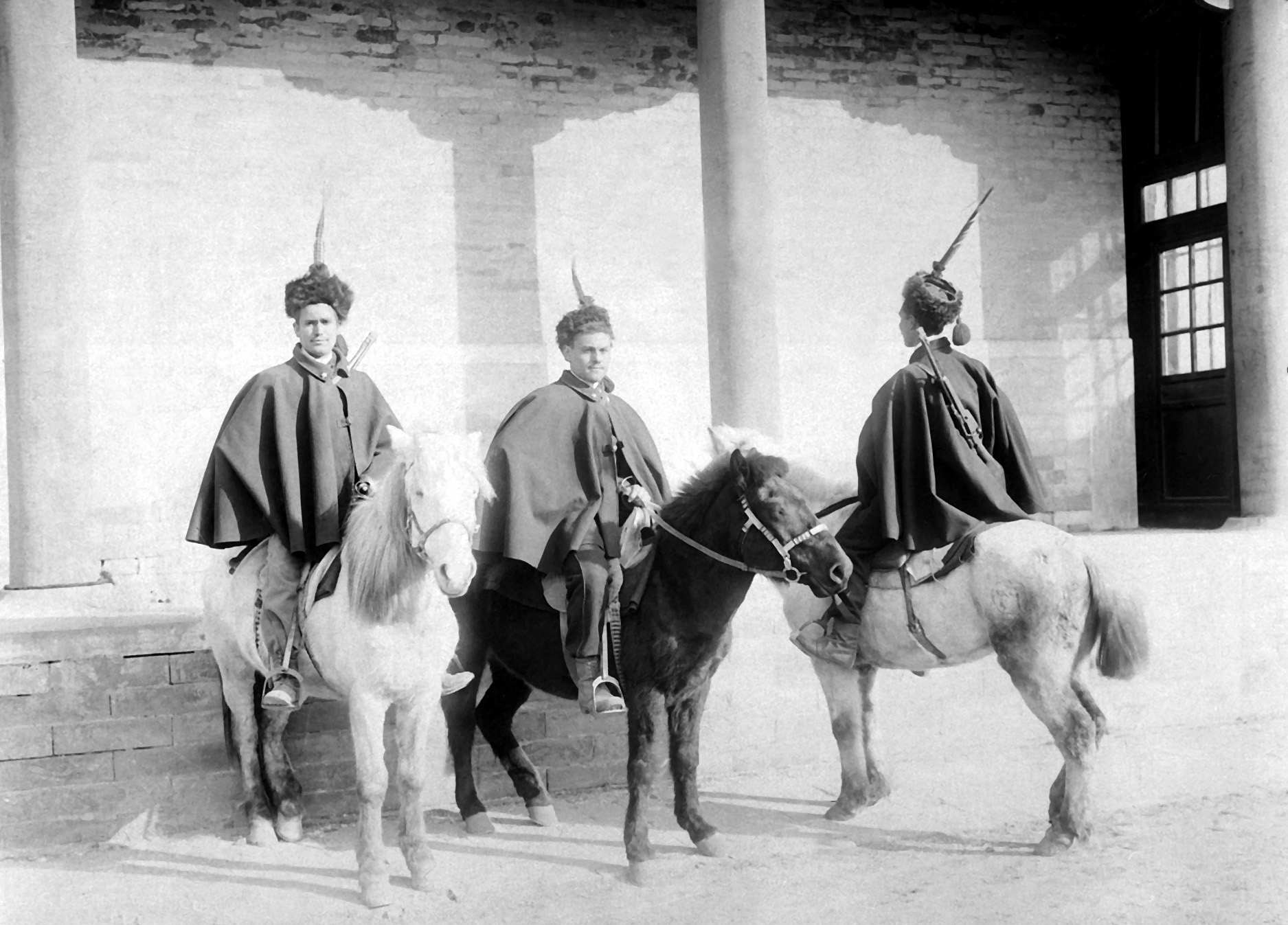
- Italian mounted infantry in China in 1900 during the Boxer Rebellion.
- Active: 5 July 1900–August 1905
- Country: Kingdom of Italy
- Branch: Regio Esercito ("Royal Army"); Regia Marina ("Royal Navy")
- Type: Expeditionary force
- Size: Regiment
- Part of: Eight-Nation Alliance
- Engagements: Boxer Rebellion and Japanese-Italian War
- Decorations: Commemorative Medal of the Campaign in China

Commanders
- Alliance commander: Field Marshal Alfred von Waldersee
- Italian commander: Vice Admiral Camillo Candiani
- Italian ground commander: Colonel Vincenzo Garioni

The Italian Expeditionary Corps in China (Italian: Corpo di spedizione italiano in Cina) was an expeditionary force the Kingdom of Italy sent to China in the summer of 1900 to assist in the efforts of the Eight-Nation Alliance to put down the Boxer Rebellion. It began to return to Italy in 1901, but some of its elements operated in China until 1905. The Italian participation in the campaign against the Boxers allowed Italy to obtain the Italian concession of Tientsin in 1901.

== Background ==
The Boxer Rebellion was an anti-colonialist and anti-Christian movement of the Society of Righteous and Harmonious Fists (Yìhéquán), known in English as the "Boxers," which took place in China between November 1899 and 7 September 1901. The uprising was a reaction to Western and Japanese imperialist expansion in China that included European opium merchants, political invasion, economic manipulation, and missionary evangelization. In 1898, local organizations in Shantung (now Shandong) rebelled in response to both imperialist expansion and internal Chinese problems such as the Qing dynasty's fiscal crisis and natural disasters. Initially the Qing dynasty repressed the rebellion, but the dynasty later attempted to take advantage of the rebellion to free China from foreign influence. With the slogan "Support the Qing, destroy the foreigners" ("扶清灭洋"), the Boxers attacked missionary settlements throughout northern China. Many thousands of Chinese Christians were killed because the Boxers considered them responsible for foreign domination in China.

After the first violence in Peking (now Beijing) against Westerners and Japanese, eight countries – Austria-Hungary, the British Empire, France, the German Empire, the Kingdom of Italy, the Japanese Empire, the Russian Empire, and the United States – formed the Eight-Nation Alliance to intervene in the Boxer Rebellion, protect their citizens and interests in China, and suppress the Boxers. Naval vessels of the eight countries arrived at Tientsin (now Tianjin) on the northeastern coast of China by the end of May 1900, and on 1 June 1900 the first contingent of 436 armed sailors (75 British, 75 French, 75 Russian, 60 American, 50 German, 41 Italian, 30 Japanese, and 30 Austro-Hungarian) disembarked from the ships and went by train to Peking to protect Westerners and Japanese who had taken refuge from the Boxers in the Peking Legation Quarter. The Boxers soon began a siege of the International Legations in Peking, and by 15 June 1900, some Italian and French military personnel were separated from the rest of the contingent, defending the Beitang Church, a Roman Catholic cathedral in Peking, which the Boxers also besieged.

A second force of the eight nations arrived in China, and the Seymour Expedition, consisting of 914 British, 540 German, 312 Russian, 158 French, 112 American, 54 Japanese, 41 Italian – including Italian marines disembarked from the protected cruiser Calabria under the command of ‘’Tenente di vascello" ("Ship-of-the-line lieutenant") Sirianni – and 25 Austro-Hungarian personnel set out from Tientsin on 10 June 1900 to march on Peking while Allied landing forces (including an Italian one under the command of Tenente di vascello Giambattista Tanca) attacked the Taku Forts on the Chinese coast. In the Battle of the Taku Forts, European and Japanese forces captured the forts from Qing Dynasty forces on 16–17 June 1900 in an action which prompted the open intervention of China's ruling Qing Empire in the conflict on the side of the Boxers. Meanwhile, the Chinese repelled the Seymour Expedition with losses and forced it to return to its starting point at Tientsin on 26 June 1900. A group of 20 Italian sailors commanded by Sottotenente di vascello ("Ship-of-the-Line Sublieutenant") Ermanno Carlotto distinguished themselves in the defense of Tientsin: In clashes with the Boxers, 10 Italian sailors died, including Carlotto himself on 27 June 1900. The expedition came to an end on 28 June 1900.

== Operational history ==
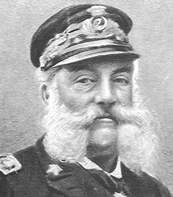
Vice ammiraglio ("Vice Admiral") Camillo Candiani.

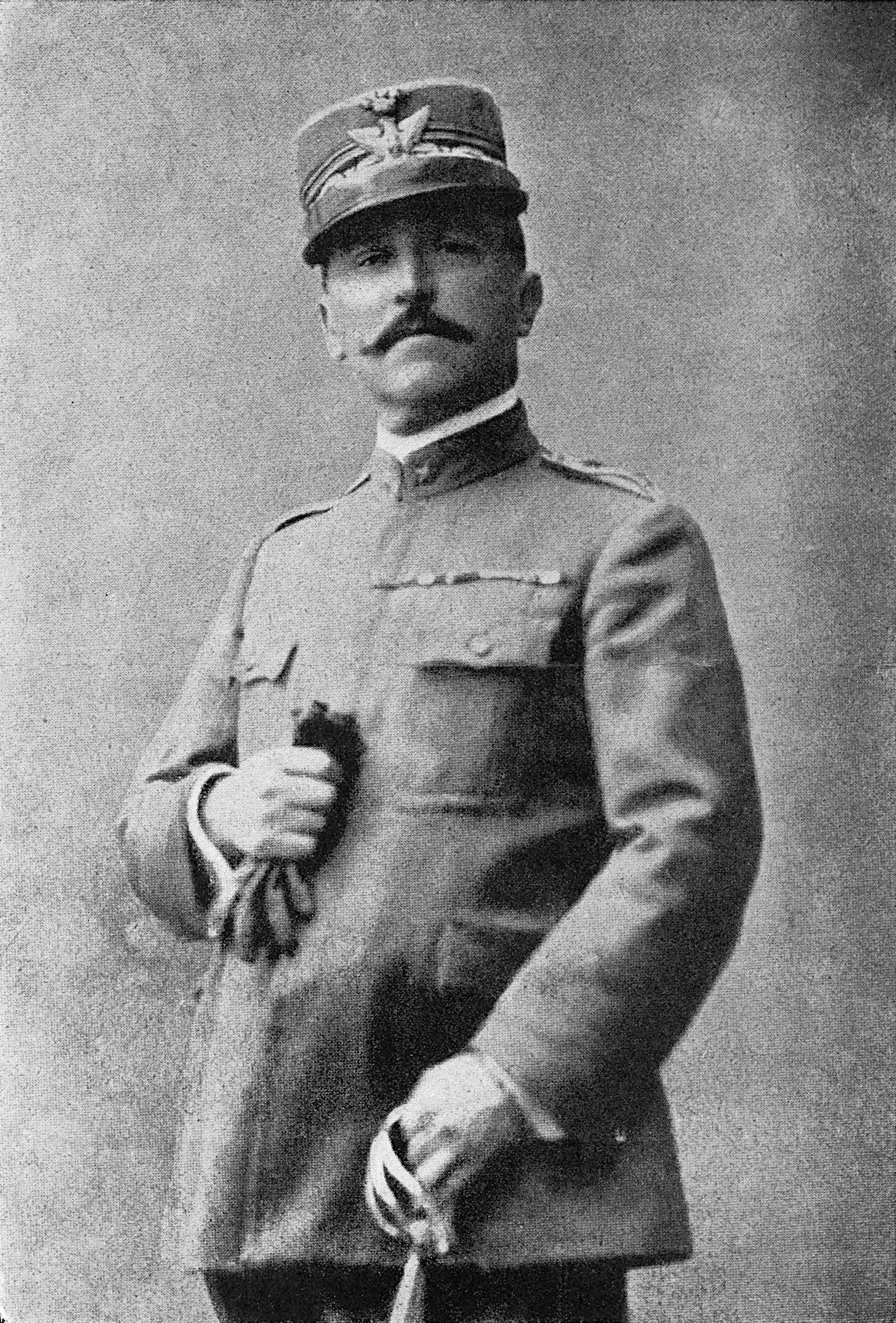
Colonello ("Colonel") Vincenzo Garioni, photographed as a maggior generale ("major general") in 1914.

On 5 July 1900, the Italian Parliament decided on a more massive military intervention in China by sending an expeditionary force, the Italian Expeditionary Corps in China, of more than 2,000 men under the command of Colonnello ("Colonel") Vincenzo Garioni of the Bersaglieri ("sharpshooters") . The Expeditionary Corps was recruited mostly on a voluntary basis with an additional salary per day of 8 lire for commissioned officers, 2 lire for non-commissioned officers, and 40 centesimi for troops.

While the Expeditionary Corps was being recruited and prepared, the Italian Regia Marina ("Royal Navy") sent an advance force, the Forza Navale Oceanica ("Oceanic Naval Force"), to Chinese waters under the command of Vice ammiraglio ("Vice Admiral") Camillo Candiani, who also was designated as the overall commander of Italian forces participating in the Eight-Nation Alliance's intervention in China. The naval force consisted of Candiani's flagship, the protected cruiser Ettore Fieramosca, as well as the armored cruiser Vettor Pisani and the protected cruiser Vesuvio. The three cruisers carried four companies of marine infantry.

Between 16 and 19 July 1900, the Expeditionary Corps completed its embarkation operations aboard the Italian Navigation Company steamers Minghetti, Giava, and Singapore at Naples. On the morning of 19 July 1900, King Umberto I and Minister of War Coriolano Ponza di San Martino reviewed the force. Escorted by the protected cruiser Stromboli, the three steamers got underway from Naples on the evening of 19 July 1900 and stopped at Port Said on 23 July, Aden on 29 July, and Singapore from 12 to 14 August 1900 before beginning the final leg of their voyage to Tientsin.

While the Expeditionary Corps was at sea, the Eight-Nation Alliance mounted the Gaselee Expedition, a second attempt to reach Peking composed of 10,000 Japanese, 4,000 Russian, 3,000 British, 2,000 American, 800 French, 200 German, 100 Austro-Hungarian, and 100 Italian personnel. Under the command of British Lieutenant General Alfred Gaselee, the expedition began from Tientsin on 4 August 1900. It defeated the Boxers and lifted the siege of the legation and the Beitang Church in the Battle of Peking in mid-August, and succeeded in conquering Peking by 28 August 1900, when the forces of the eight nations paraded through the Forbidden City.

The Italian Expeditionary Corps in China arrived at Tientsin on 29 August 1900. Once disembarked, it traveled the 150 kilometres (93 miles) by train from Tientsin to Peking, where it participated in the Allied occupation of the city. The international contingent appointed Imperial German Army Generalfeldmarschall ("Field Marshal") Alfred von Waldersee as its overall commander on 26 September 1900 despite strong resistance to his selection from France and the United Kingdom and lesser opposition from Italy.

In Peking, the Italian military contingent was assigned to garrison a neighborhood near the Huang Tsun barracks. It also took part in the alliance's actions to counter the last resistance within China, which involved 50,000 men, of whom 2,500 were Italians. On 2 September 1900, 470 men of the Italian Expeditionary Corps in China organized in three companies, two of Bersaglieri and one of marines, captured the Chan-hai-tuan forts. On another occasion, the French military contingent moved to occupy the village of Paoting-fu in conflict with von Waldersee's orders which provided for a mixed German and Italian contingent to occupy the village. Garioni anticipated the French move and with a force of 330 men instead occupied the town of Cunansien, which the alliance originally had entrusted to the French.

The Expeditionary Corps began to return to Italy in August 1901, and the Boxer Protocol of 7 September 1901 brought the Boxer War to an end. Two companies of Bersaglieri returned to Italy in 1902, and the remaining companies, united in a mixed battalion, remained in China until 1905 and returned to Italy aboard the Florio Rubattino Company steamer Perseo in August 1905. Some Carabinieri, together with specialist troops, subsequently remained in the Italian concession of Tientsin even after the Expeditionary Corps returned to Italy.

== Composition ==
Artillerymen of the expeditionary corps in Peking, 1900

The Expeditionary Force consisted of 83 officers, 1,882 non-commissioned officers and troops, and 178 animals. It was composed of:

- A command element consisting of:
  - The commanding officer, Collonnello ("Colonel") Vincenzo Garioni
  - One squad of Royal Carabinieri, consisting of one maresciallo ("marshal"), one vicebrigadier ("vice-brigadier"), and six carabinieri)
  - One officer, Lieutenant Pietro Verri, in charge of military intelligence
- One infantry battalion, commanded by Tenente colonnello ("Lieutenant colonel") Tommaso Salsa of the Alpini, made up of:
  - One company of the 10th Battalion of the 8th Infantry Regiment "Cuneo"
  - One company of the 10th Battalion of the 41st Infantry Regiment "Modena"
  - One company of the 6th Battalion of the 43rd Infantry Regiment "Forlì"
  - One company of the 12th Battalion of the 69th Infantry Regiment "Ancona"
- Two groups of marine riflemen embarked on the protected cruiser Calabria under the command of Lieutenant Ermanno Carlotto and Lieutenant Sirianni

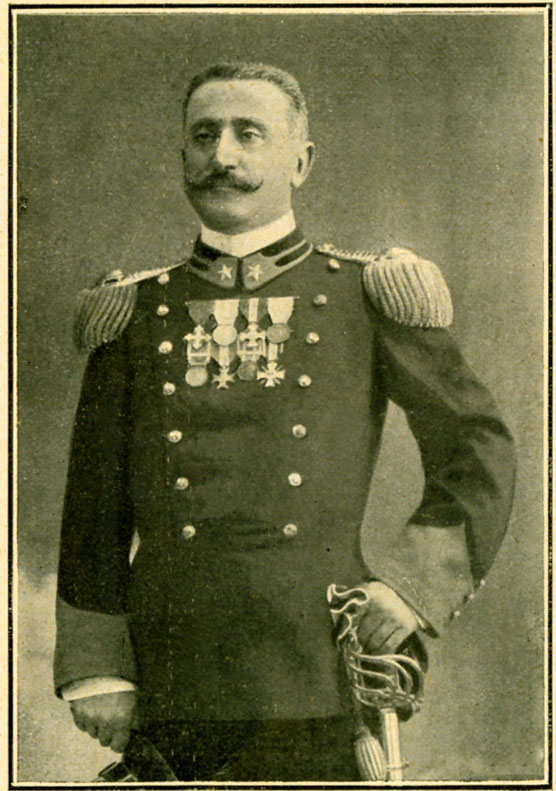
Luigi Agliardi, photographed as a colonnello ("colonel") in 1911.

- One battalion of "Far East" Bersaglieri, 840 men commanded by Maggiore ("Major") Luigi Agliardi of the 5th Bersaglieri Regiment of Rome, composed of:
  - One company made up of troops of the 5th Bersaglieri Regiment (stationed in Rome) and 9th Bersaglieri Regiment (stationed in Leghorn), on which the command Staff of the Expeditionary Corps was based;
  - One company made up of troops of the 8th Bersaglieri Regiment (stationed in Naples) and 1st Bersaglieri Regiment (stationed in Palermo);
  - One company made up of troops of the 4th Bersaglieri Regiment (stationed in Bologna) and 11th Bersaglieri Regiment (stationed in Ancona);
  - One company made up of troops of the 2nd Bersaglieri Regiment (stationed in Milan) and 6th Bersaglieri Regiment (stationed in Verona);
- One machine gun battery, with four Gardner guns and artillery personnel, commanded by Captain Alcide Vallauri;
- One mixed detachment of engineers from the 1st Engineer Regiment and 3rd Engineer Regiment, commanded by Lieutenant Vito Modugno and composed of:
  - One sapper group
  - One bridging group
  - One optical telegrapher group
- One field hospital with five beds
- One field kitchen squad with four mobile iron ovens

In addition to the marines under the command of Carlotto and Sirianni, other contingents of riflemen commanded by Vice ammiraglio ("Vice admiral") Candiani landed shortly thereafter.

== Clothing, equipment, and subsistence ==
The Expeditionary Corps wore a canvas uniform, colonial cork helmet, standard boots, and various types of furs and winter clothing suitable for the harsh climate of North China, where temperatures can drop to as low as −20 °C (−4 °F). To ensure the troops had enough winter clothing, Minister of War Coriolano Ponza di San Martino ordered the Italian royal consul in Shanghai to purchase 2,000 furs locally for the troops. He reported:

"Our soldiers left with their complete equipment, which also consisted of new items: those who had old items had left them and others had been distributed to them; therefore a Bersagliere cape, colonial helmet, and then a coat and a greatcoat for everyone, including the Bersaglieri, who do not normally wear it; everyone had a woolen hood like those worn in the Alps, Val d'Aosta-style woolen leggings, woolen socks, flannel gloves, and then a supply of all the equipment materials, cloth jackets and trousers, knitted doublets and so on. […] Admiral Candiani then telegraphed from Peking on 7 November [1900]: 'Provide us with sufficient furs' and Colonel Garioni in his report of 4 December [1900] literally wrote as follows: 'The furs ordered for the military troops in Shanghai correspond very well to the purpose because they can be worn comfortably under the coat.' Each soldier is given a fur coat which serves as a bed covering. Finally, from the reports it appears that after the expedition of Calgan [a Chinese city in the Hopeh [now Hebei] region where the Great Wall meets, the theater of joint Allied operations, in which the Italian Bersaglieri also participated. It was a commercial center of great importance, a depot of tea shipped to Siberia with the use of half a million camels, as well as a production center for 'Kalgan' type furs produced with Tibetan and Mongolian wool. – Ed.] other furs have been requisitioned, so that now the soldiers have all of them and two. By then adapting strips of fur to the fez, a very appropriate headdress was obtained because it also allows you to keep the hood on. This is a sui generis coverage; I don't know if it's beautiful but they tell me it's very comfortable. [...] Colonel Garioni always replied that he was provided for the whole winter and only asked for coats, cloaks, and shoes in case he had to go beyond the spring [...] and the supplies were sent to him."

For logistical support, the Expeditionary Corps relied on 178 animals, mostly mules, because Chinese roads were impassable for other means of transport. The daily food ration for Expeditionary Corps troops included 750 grams (26 oz) of bread, 375 grams (13.2 oz) of meat, 125 grams (4.4 oz) of rice or pasta, 15 grams (0.5 oz) of coffee, 20 grams (0.7 oz) of sugar, 20 grams (0.7 oz) of salt, 0.5 grams (0.02 oz) of pepper, and 15 grams (0.5 oz) of lard.

== Losses ==
Italian forces suffered 18 deaths in China during the Boxer Rebellion:

- During the Seymour Expedition, two columns of Boxers suddenly attacked a small group of Regia Marina personnel on the outskirts of Seymour's column at Langfang on 14 June 1900. The Italians suffered five dead: A chief petty officer from the protected cruiser Calabria, three gunners, and a trumpeter were killed and, with the exception of one of the gunners, were awarded a posthumous Gold Medal of Military Valor.
- In fighting at Tientsin on 19 June 1900, a sottotenente (ensign) from the protected cruiser Elba was killed and awarded a posthumous Gold Medal of Military Valor.
- In the defense of the International Legations in Peking, six men were killed: A sailor and a gunner on 24 June 1900, the latter receiving a posthumous Gold Medal of Military Valor; a sailor on 1 July 1900; a gunner on 2 July 1900 who was awarded a posthumous Gold Medal of Military Valor; a gunner on 3 July 1900; and another gunner sometime in July 1900 who received a posthumous Gold Medal of Military Valor.
- In the defense of the Beitang Church six men — four gunners and two sailors — were killed, all on 12 August 1900, and two of the gunners and one sailor were awarded a posthumous Gold Medal of Military Valor.

== Journalistic coverage ==
Embarked with the expeditionary corps when it departed Italy in July 1900 were numerous journalists, and others, such as Luigi Barzini, joined the Italian contingent in China in 1901. The Eight-Nation Alliance was responsible for the looting of many historical artifacts of Chinese origin, such as those found in the Summer Palace, and instigated the burning of many important Chinese buildings in an attempt to rout the Boxer rebels, but journalists reported fewer clashes with the Chinese and less looting and repression in the Italian-occupied area of Peking than in other neighborhoods. Two official photographers – medical Lieutenant Giuseppe Messerotti Benvenuti from Modena, who used a Kodak camera, and Lieutenant Luigi Paolo Piovano from Chieri with a Goertz camera – captured an extensive photographic record of the Expeditionary Corps's stay in China. Both also photographed the horrors of repression, namely the shootings, beheadings, looting, and rubble.

== Campaign medal ==
Members of the Italian Expeditionary Corps in China were among Italian personnel eligible for the Commemorative Medal of the Campaign in China, established by King Victor Emmanuel III by royal decree on 23 June 1901.

== Italian concession of Tientsin ==
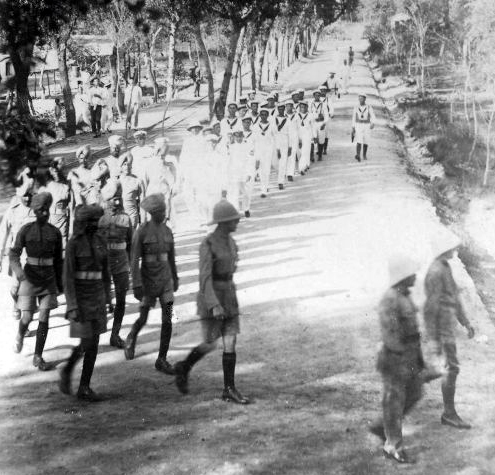
An Italian naval unit marches behind a British Indian unit in Tientsin (now Tianjin), where both the United Kingdom and the Kingdom of Italy had concessions, sometime between 1910 and 1915.

With the Boxer Protocol of 7 September 1901, Italy obtained control of the Italian concession of Tientsin, an area of 45 hectares (111 acres) consisting of a village, land along the river rich in salt marshes, and a large marshy area used as a cemetery. After a period of Italian disinterest in the concession, a cleanup began. The Italian presence lasted until 10 September 1943. Following the Armistice of Cassibile and Italy's joining of the Allies on 9 September 1943, Japanese troops invaded the concession. Following the conclusion of hostilities, the concession's troops would either swear allegiance to the Italian Social Republic or be imprisoned alongside Italian civilians.

== See also ==
- Sanmen Bay Affair
