= Luigi Agliardi =

Italian general (1858–1931)

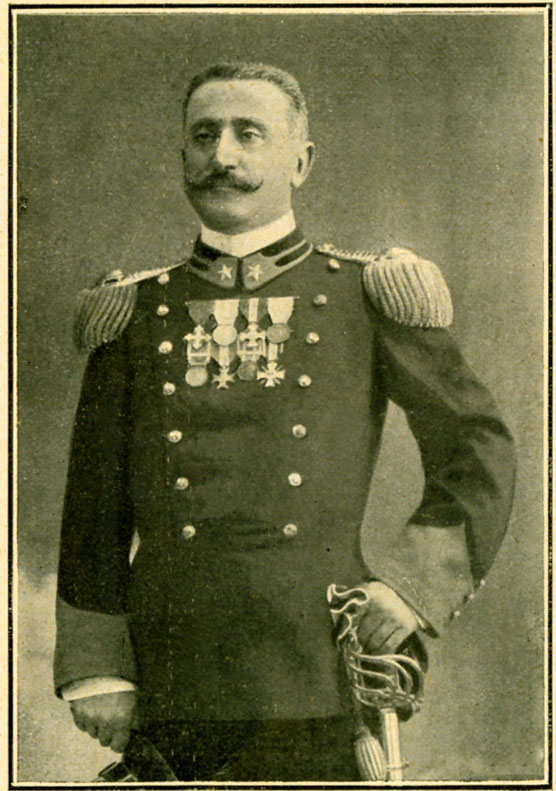
- Born: June 5, 1858; Mantua, Lombardy-Venetia, Austrian Empire
- Died: February 14, 1931 (aged 72); Cologno al Serio, Lombardy, Italy
- Military career
- Allegiance: Italy
- Branch: Royal Italian Army
- Service years: 1874–1914; 1915–1921
- Rank: Maggior Generale in Comando di Brigata
- Commands: La Spezia Brigade; Novara Infantry Brigade
- Conflicts: First Italo-Ethiopian War; Boxer Rebellion; Italo-Turkish War; World War I; Italian front; Battles of the Isonzo

Luigi Agliardi was an Italian Major General during the late 19th and early 20th centuries. He was known for his extensive service, participating in the First Italo-Ethiopian War, the Boxer Rebellion and the Italo-Turkish War before his promotion to major general in 1914. He was also known as a figure during the Red Week as he was taken prisoner by the socialists which caused a controversy within his military career.

== Early Military Career ==
Luigi was born on June 5, 1858, as the son of Luigi and Elisa Bertoli. He began attending the Scuola Militare Teulié in October 1874 before transferring to the Military Academy of Modena from where he would graduate on October 10, 1877, with the rank of second lieutenant. He then served as a Bersaglieri before taking part in the First Italo-Ethiopian War with the rank of captain. He was then promoted to major in 1898 but left for China two years later on July 1, 1900. During the rebellion, he commanded the 1st Infantry Battalion consisting of four Bersaglieri regiments along with Lieutenant Colonel Tommaso Salsa under the command of Colonel Vincenzo Garioni. Agilardi was then promoted to colonel in 1909 and given command of the 29th Infantry Regiment and later given command of the 3rd Bersaglieri Regiment in 1911 but was then transferred to the 11th Bersaglieri Regiment.

He'd lead the regiment during the Italo-Turkish War, fighting in Tripolitania and Cyrenaica. For his services in Ethiopia and Libya, he was awarded the officer of the Military Order of Savoy, the Bronze Medal of Military Valor and the Silver Medal of Military Valor. In 1914, he was promoted to major general and assumed command of the Casale Military Brigade.

== The Red Week ==
On June 11, 1914, his military career suffered a severe blow when he was taken prisoner in the Savio River by armed demonstrators who held him captive for a certain period of time. At that moment, he commanded the Forlì Infantry Brigade and had left for the Cesenatico area aboard a horse carriage under the view that the travel would be safe to inspect the coast in view of a possible invasion by the Austro-Hungarian Army in a hypothetical war. Stopped by the rioters, and not being able to defend themselves armed only with standard sabers that remained in the carriages, Agliardi and his officers were taken to the Torsani restaurant. When the officers handed over their sabers in order to avoid an armed confrontation. Shortly after, the tension died down but shortly after a cavalry platoon from Ravenna arrived and ordered the demonstrators to release the prisoners without delay. Desperately determined to resist, the strikers were persuaded to give up the fight thanks to his mediation with the cavalry platoon commander. He obtained the dissolution of the checkpoint and the withdrawal of the cavalry in exchange for the release of all the captured soldiers. Agilardi was harshly criticized by his superiors for having come to terms with the demonstrators, which was considered dishonorable for the officers of the Royal Italian Army and his removal was strongly desired by the Chief of Staff of the Army, General Alberto Pollio. As a result of this, he was made available and shortly retired his length of service, retiring as a reserve on July 16.

== World War I ==
With the Italian entry into World War I on May 24, 1915, Agliardi was recalled to active service. On the Italian front of May 25, he commanded the La Spezia Infantry Brigade which was formed from the 124th and 125th Infantry Regiments to operate within the 32nd Division. In command of the brigade, he took part in the actions at Monte Kuk on June 27, Monte Sabotino on July 23–24 and against the Globna positions on November 1–2. On 9 December he left command of the unit, replaced by General Giovanni Cattaneo. On 11 December he assumed command of the "Novara" Infantry Brigade formed from the 153rd and 154th Infantry Regiments. He maintained the brigade until January 14, 1916, when he was replaced by Colonel Luigi Solari and he then participated in the defense of Oslavia. Due to the loss of this position, the Italian forces briefly recaptured it between days 15 and 17 before being completely lost by the 24th day and Agliardi was dismissed by order of General Luigi Cadorna. He Subsequently, took part in the conquest of Gorizia, setting foot on the right bank of the Isonzo River on August 8, 1916. Between 1917 and 1918, he commanded the XXVII Marching Brigade and for the defense of the Codroipo bridgehead during the rout of Caporetto he was awarded his second Silver Medal of Military Valor. In October 1918, he assumed command of the XI Bersaglieri Brigade, which he held until the end of the war.

After the end of the war, he was placed on reserves in December 1918. He was promoted to major general of the Reserves in October 1921 and retired shortly after. He died in Cologno al Serio on February 14, 1931.

He was awarded the honors of Commander of the Order of the Crown of Italy Knight of the Order of Saints Maurice and Lazarus and the Maurician medal for 10 decades of military career. The municipality of Savio dedicated a street to his memory in 2007.

== Awards ==
- Knight of the Military Order of Savoy (28 December 1913)
- Silver Medal of Military Valor (two awardeds)
- Bronze Medal of Military Valor (first award)

They cooperated with their companies in the success of the battle, demonstrating exemplary intelligence and courage. For the battle of Mai Maret, February 25, 1896.

— 16 February 1898

- Bronze Medal of Military Valor (second award)

With the department under his orders he managed to take possession of the northern gate of the city, thus repelling the enemy who was trying to retake it. For the occupation of Cu-nan-sien, November 2–3, 1900.

— 10 July 1901

- Knight of the Order of the Crown of Italy
- Officer of the Order of the Crown of Italy, Officer (29 May 1913)
- Commander of the Order of the Crown of Italy
- Knight of the Order of Saints Maurice and Lazarus
- Maurician medal
- Commemorative Medal of the African Campaigns
- Commemorative Medal of the Campaign in China
- Commemorative Medal for the Italo-Turkish War 1911–1912
- Commemorative Medal for the Italo-Austrian War 1915–1918
- Allied Victory Medal
