= Soviet invasion =

Soviet Invasion or Soviet Offensive can refer to:

- Ukrainian–Soviet War (1917–1920), also known as the Soviet–Ukrainian War
- Soviet westward offensive of 1918–1919
- Second phase of the Polish–Soviet War (1920), when Soviet armies marched on Warsaw, Poland
- Red Army invasion of Azerbaijan (1920), also known as the Soviet-Azerbaijan War
- Red Army invasion of Armenia (1920), also known as the Soviet-Armenia War
- Red Army invasion of Georgia (1921), also known as the Soviet–Georgian War
- Soviet invasion of Poland (1939), a military operation during the early stages of World War II
- Soviet invasion of Estonia, Latvia, Lithuania and Finland (1939–40), several military operations during the early stages of World War II
- Soviet invasion of Romania (disambiguation)
- Anglo-Soviet invasion of Iran (1941), when British and Commonwealth forces and the Soviet Union invaded Iran during World War II
- Soviet Offensive (1941-1942)
- Soviet invasion of Manchuria (1945), part of the Soviet–Japanese War in World War II
- Warsaw Pact invasion of Czechoslovakia (1968), invasion of the Czechoslovak Socialist Republic
- Soviet–Afghan War (1979–1989)
- Soviet Invasion (album), an EP by the band Witchfinder General

== See also ==
- Russian invasion (disambiguation)
- Invasion of Russia (disambiguation)
- Russian Expeditionary Force (disambiguation)
