= Russian invasion =

Russian invasion may refer to:

== Russian Empire ==
- Russian conquest of Siberia, 1580-1778
- Russo-Polish War (1654–1667)
- Smolensk War, 1632–1634
- Sack of Baturyn, 1708
- Russo-Circassian War, 1763–1864
- Liquidation of the Zaporozhian Sich, 1775
- Annexation of Crimea by the Russian Empire, 1783
- Partitions of Poland, 1772–1795
- Caucasian War, 1817–1864
- Russian invasion of Manchuria, 1900
- Russian occupation of Tabriz, 1911
- Russian invasion of East Prussia (1914)

== Soviet Union ==
- Soviet–Ukrainian War (1917–1920)
- Polish–Soviet War (1918/1919–1921)
- Soviet invasion of Azerbaijan, 1920
- Soviet invasion of Armenia, 1920
- Soviet invasion of Georgia, 1921
- Soviet invasion of Xinjiang, 1934
- Soviet invasion of Poland, 1939
- Winter War, 1939
- Soviet occupation of the Baltic States, 1940
- Soviet occupation of Bessarabia and Northern Bukovina, 1940
- Soviet invasion of Manchuria, 1945
- Hungarian Revolution of 1956
- Warsaw Pact invasion of Czechoslovakia, 1968
- Soviet–Afghan War, 1979–1989

== Russian Federation ==
- First Chechen War, 1994–1997
- Second Chechen War, 1999–2000
- Russo-Georgian War, 2008
- Russo-Ukrainian war, 2014–present
  - 2014 Russian annexation of Crimea
  - War in Donbas, 2014–2022
  - 2022 Russian invasion of Ukraine
  - Russo-Ukrainian war (2022–present)

== See also ==
- List of wars involving Russia
- Russian invasion of Finland (disambiguation)
- Soviet invasion (disambiguation)
- Invasion of Russia (disambiguation)
- Russian Expeditionary Force (disambiguation)
