= Eduardo Baccari =

Italian politician

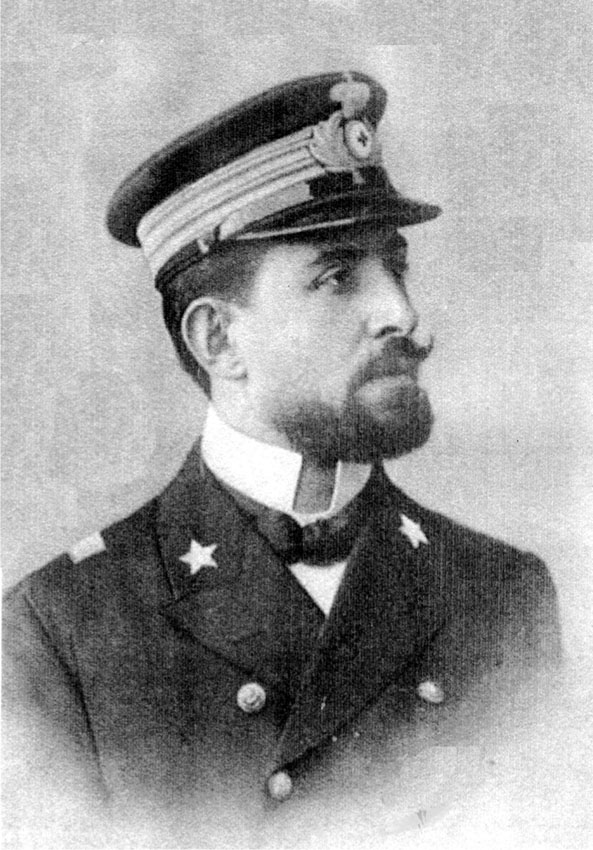
- Eduardo Baccari

Italian Governor of Cyrenaica
- In office October – December 1922
- Preceded by: Luigi Pintor
- Succeeded by: Luigi Bongiovanni

Personal details
- Born: 18 August 1871 Benevento
- Died: 11 July 1952 (aged 80) Rome

Eduardo Baccari (18 August 1871 – 11 July 1952) was an Italian politician. He had been governor of Cyrenaica for a short time in 1922. He had been appointed for the office by Giovanni Amendola, the last minister of colonies before Mussolini's coming to power in October 1922, and removed after the affirmation of the latter's government.

Formerly, he had been sent to London and Italian Somaliland to define the latter's border with British one.
