= Attilio Teruzzi =

Italian soldier, colonial administrator and politician

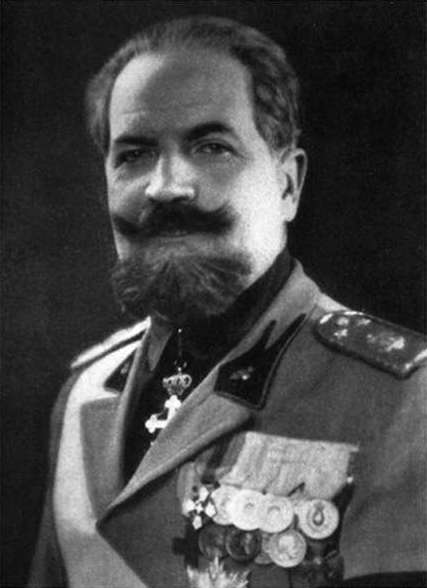

Minister of Italian Africa
- In office 31 October 1939 – 25 July 1943
- Prime Minister: Benito Mussolini
- Preceded by: Benito Mussolini (interim)
- Succeeded by: Melchiade Gabba

Governor of Cyrenaica
- In office 2 December 1926 – 31 December 1928
- Preceded by: Ernesto Mombelli
- Succeeded by: Pietro Badoglio

Member of the Chamber of Deputies
- In office 24 March 1924 – 2 August 1943

Personal details
- Born: 5 May 1882 Milan, Kingdom of Italy
- Died: 26 April 1950 (aged 67) Procida, Italy
- Party: PNF (1920-1943); PFR (1943-1945)
- Spouse: Liliana Weinmann

Attilio Teruzzi (5 May 1882 – 26 April 1950) was an Italian soldier, colonial administrator, and Fascist politician.

Born in Milan, Teruzzi completed military studies and was promoted colonel in the Italian Army at the unusual age of 28. In 1911, he served in Libya during the Italo-Turkish War – taking part in the victory at Misrata (Misrata). He later captured Nalut, and was wounded in the battle over Fezzan – being awarded the Silver Medal of Military Valor.

After service in World War I (when he was again decorated), Teruzzi took leave from the army in 1920, in order to engage in Fascist politics. He was an enthusiastic adherent to Benito Mussolini's National Fascist Party, and the party's deputy-secretary in 1921 – the year he also took part in the March on Rome, as a commander of Blackshirt squads from Emilia-Romagna. After the Fascist takeover, Teruzzi was elected to the Italian Chamber of Deputies in 1924 and gained successive terms.

An undersecretary in the Ministry of the Interior in 1925–26, Teruzzi was governor of Cyrenaica in 1926–28, before returning to the military. He was Chief of Staff for the MVSN (the Milizia formed by the Blackshirts) from 1935; from 1937 to 1939, he was undersecretary in the Ministry for Italian Africa (Libya and Italian East Africa), and titular Minister from 1939 to 1943. During the Spanish Civil War, Teruzzi was promoted to Lieutenant General and appointed Inspector General of the Blackshirts.

After Mussolini's ousting and Italy's exit from the World War II Axis powers – through the armistice in Cassibile at the end of July 1943, Teruzzi followed Il Duce in his Nazi-backed refuge in Northern Italy, and helped found the Fascist Italian Social Republic. He was also one of its most prestigious military leaders. In 1945, as the regime crumbled, rumours circulated that he died, instead he was kept prisoner in Procida, after receiving a 30-year sentence. He died only 20 days after his release in 1950.
