= Ottavio Briccola =

Italian general during the Italo-Turkish War

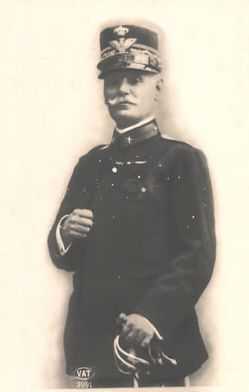

Italian Governor of Cyrenaica
- In office 15 October 1912 – October 1913
- Preceded by: Ottoman Empire
- Succeeded by: Giovanni Ameglio

Personal details
- Born: 1853 Turin
- Died: 1924 (aged 70–71) Viareggio

Ottavio Briccola (1853-1924) was an Italian general. He was the first Italian governor of Cyrenaica after he had participated in the Italo-Turkish War.

At the beginning of World War I he commanded the 8th corps of the Italian fifth army.
