= Pietro Badoglio =

Italian military officer (1871–1956)

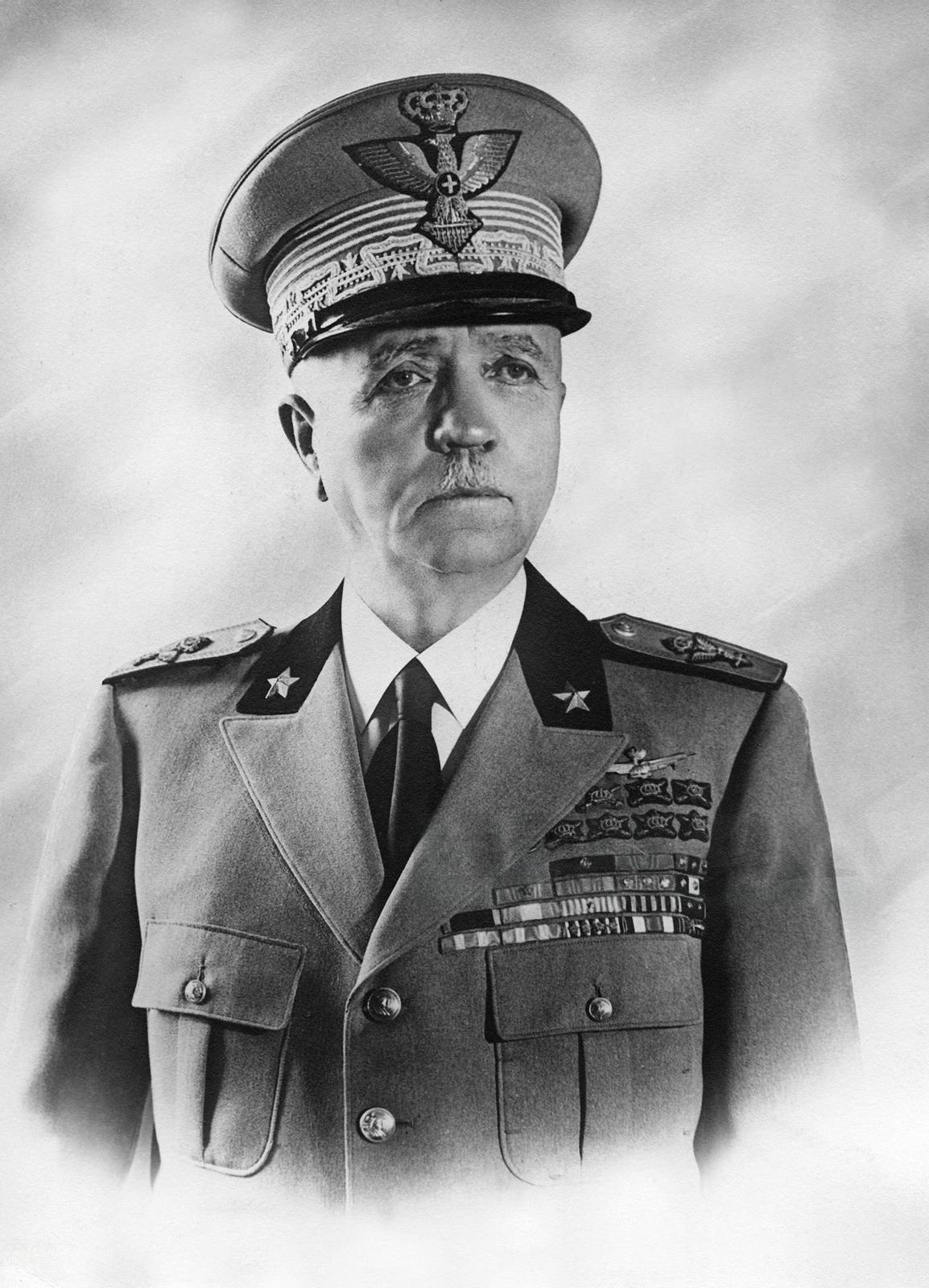

Prime Minister of Italy
- In office 25 July 1943 – 18 June 1944
- Monarch: Victor Emmanuel III
- Lieutenant General: Prince Umberto
- Deputy: Palmiro Togliatti
- Preceded by: Benito Mussolini
- Succeeded by: Ivanoe Bonomi

Minister of Foreign Affairs
- In office 11 February 1944 – 18 June 1944
- Prime Minister: Himself
- Preceded by: Raffaele Guariglia
- Succeeded by: Ivanoe Bonomi

Minister of the Italian Africa
- In office 11 February 1944 – 18 June 1944
- Prime Minister: Himself
- Preceded by: Melchiade Gabba
- Succeeded by: Ivanoe Bonomi
Other offices
Governor-General of Italian East Africa and Viceroy of Ethiopia
In office 9 May 1936 – 11 June 1936
Monarch	Victor Emmanuel III
Preceded by	Offices established
Succeeded by	Rodolfo Graziani
Commissary of the Italian East Africa
In office 28 November 1935 – 9 May 1936
Preceded by	Emilio De Bono
Succeeded by	Office abolished
Governor of Eritrea
In office 22 November 1935 – 9 May 1936
Preceded by	Emilio De Bono
Succeeded by	Alfredo Guzzoni
Governor of Tripolitania and Cyrenaica
In office 24 January 1929 – 31 December 1933
Preceded by	Emilio De Bono (Tripolitania); Attilio Teruzzi (Cyrenaica)
Succeeded by	Italo Balbo (Governor of Libya)
Chief of the Italian General Staff
In office 4 May 1925 – 5 December 1940
Preceded by	Office established
Succeeded by	Ugo Cavallero
Chief of Staff of the Royal Italian Army
In office 25 November 1919 – 2 February 1921
Preceded by	Armando Diaz
Succeeded by	Giuseppe Vaccari
In office 4 May 1925 – 1 February 1927
Preceded by	Giuseppe Francesco Ferrari
Succeeded by	Giuseppe Francesco Ferrari

Personal details
- Born: 28 September 1871 Grazzano Monferrato, Italy
- Died: 1 November 1956 (aged 85) Grazzano Badoglio, Italy
- Party: Independent
- Spouse: Sofia Valania (m. 1904; died 1942)

Military service
- Allegiance: Kingdom of Italy
- Branch/service: Royal Italian Army
- Years of service: 1892–1943
- Rank: Marshal of Italy
- Battles/wars: First Italo–Ethiopian War; Italo–Turkish War; World War I; Pacification of Libya; Second Italo–Ethiopian War; World War II

Pietro Badoglio, 1st Duke of Addis Ababa, 1st Marquess of Sabotino (US: /bəˈdoʊljoʊ/ bə-DOH-lyoh, Italian: [ˈpjɛːtro baˈdɔʎʎo]; 28 September 1871 – 1 November 1956), was an Italian general during both world wars and the first viceroy of Italian East Africa. With the fall of the Fascist regime, he became Prime Minister of Italy.

== Early life and career ==
Badoglio was born in 1871. His father, Mario Badoglio, was a modest landowner, and his mother, Antonietta Pittarelli, was of middle-class background. On 5 October 1888 he was admitted to the Royal Military Academy in Turin. He received the rank of second lieutenant in 1890. In 1892, he finished his studies and was promoted to first lieutenant.

After completing his studies, he served with the Regio Esercito (Italian Royal Army) from 1892, at first as a lieutenant (tenente) in artillery. During the First Italo-Ethiopian War on February 1896 he was sent to Eritrea with General Antonio Baldissera and took part in the expedition to Adigrat to free Major Marcello Prestinari from the siege. He subsequently remained on garrison duty on the plateau, at Adi Keyh, until the end of 1898. Back in Italy, after attending the Army War School, he was promoted to captain on 13 July 1903 and took part in the Italo-Turkish War (1911–12) where he was decorated for military valour for having organised the action at Ain Zara and promoted to major for war merit for having planned the occupation of the Janzur.

== First World War ==
At the beginning of Italian participation in the First World War, he was a lieutenant colonel (tenente colonnello); he rose to the rank of major general following his handling of the capture of Monte Sabotino in May 1916, and by the late months of 1917 – by now already a lieutenant general – was named as vice-chief of staff (sottocapo di stato maggiore) despite being one of those mainly responsible for the disaster during the Battle of Caporetto on 24 October 1917.

With regard to the Battle of Caporetto, although he was blamed in various quarters for his disposition of the forces under his command before the battle, a commission of inquiry rejected most of the criticisms made upon him. In the years after the First World War, in which he held several high posts in the Regio Esercito, Badoglio exerted a constant effort in modifying official documents in order to hide his role in the defeat.

== Genocide in Libya ==
After the war, Badoglio was named as a senator, but also remained in the army with special assignments to Romania and the U.S. in 1920 and 1921. At first he opposed Benito Mussolini, and after 1922 was sidelined by being sent to Brazil as ambassador. A political change of heart soon returned him to Italy and a senior role in the army, as chief of staff from 4 May 1925. On 25 June 1926, Badoglio was promoted to the rank of Marshal of Italy (Maresciallo d'Italia).

Badoglio was the first sole governor of Tripolitania and Cyrenaica (Note: Giovanni Ameglio and Vincenzo Garioni were also unique governors of Tripolitania and Cyrenaica, but this seemed to be a temporary, not permanent, policy.) (later amalgamated as Italian Libya) from 1929 to 1933. During his governorship, he played a critical part (with Rodolfo Graziani, deputy governor of Cyrenaica) in the genocide of Libyan Arabs, which was intended to quell all Libyan resistance to Italian colonial rule. On 20 June 1930, Badoglio wrote to Graziani: "As for overall strategy, it is necessary to create a significant and clear separation between the controlled population and the rebel formations. I do not hide the significance and seriousness of this measure, which might be the ruin of the subdued population ... But now the course has been set, and we must carry it out to the end, even if the entire population of Cyrenaica must perish." By 1931, well over half of the population of Cyrenaica were confined to 15 concentration camps where many died as a result of overcrowding (and lack of water, food and medicine) while Badoglio's air force used chemical weapons against the Bedouin rebels in the desert. On 24 January 1932 (the third anniversary of his appointment), Badoglio proclaimed the end of Libyan resistance for the first time since the Italian invasion in 1911.

== Italian invasion of Ethiopia ==
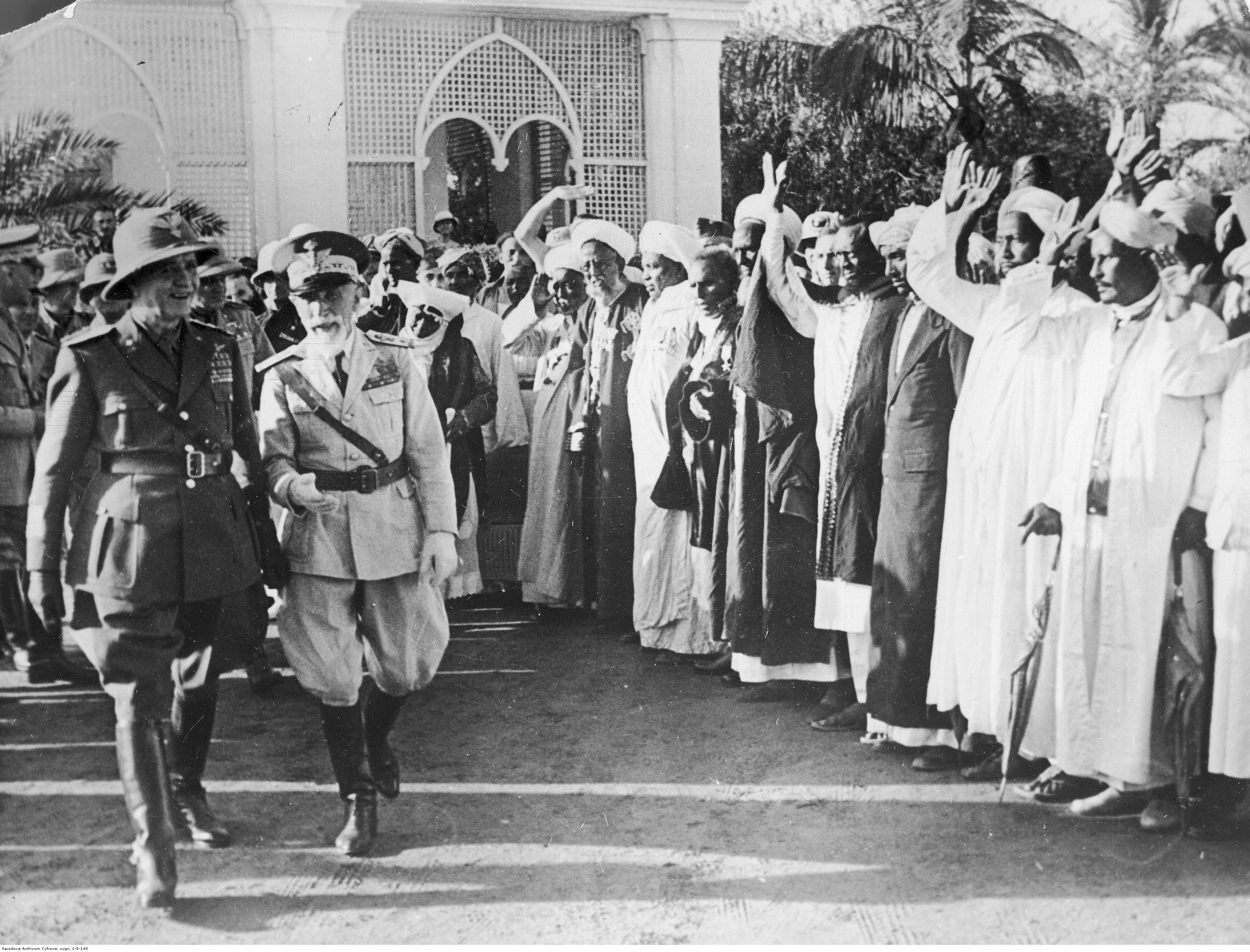
Badoglio (at left) and General Emilio De Bono (at right) at Massawa

On 3 October 1935, because the progress of De Bono's invasion of Abyssinia was judged by Mussolini to be too slow, Badoglio, who had in the meantime launched a letter campaign against Emilio de Bono, replaced de Bono as the commander. Badoglio asked for and was given permission to use chemical weapons, using the torture and murder of downed Italian pilot Tito Minniti during the Ethiopian "Christmas Offensive" as a pretext for doing so. British historian Sir Ian Kershaw wrote the "barbarous initiatives in the conduct of the war in Ethiopia" came as a rule from the military elite rather than from Mussolini himself.

Badoglio employed mustard gas to effectively destroy the Ethiopian armies confronting him on the northern front. He commanded the Italian forces at the First battle of Tembien, the Battle of Amba Aradam, the Second battle of Tembien, and the Battle of Shire. On 31 March 1936, Badoglio defeated Emperor Haile Selassie commanding the last Ethiopian army on the northern front at the Battle of Maychew. On 26 April, with no Ethiopian resistance left between his forces and Addis Ababa, Badoglio launched his "March of the Iron Will" to take the Ethiopian capital city and end the war. By 2 May, Haile Selassie had fled the country.

On 5 May 1936, Marshal Badoglio led the victorious Italian troops into Addis Ababa. Mussolini declared King Victor Emmanuel to be the Emperor of Ethiopia, and Ethiopia became part of the Italian Empire. On this occasion, Badoglio was appointed the first viceroy and governor general of Ethiopia and ennobled with the victory title of Duke of Addis Abeba ad personam.

On 11 June 1936, Rodolfo Graziani replaced Badoglio as viceroy and governor-general of Ethiopia. Badoglio returned to his duties as supreme chief of the Italian general staff. According to Time magazine, Badoglio even joined the Fascist Party in early June. In 1938, his birthplace took the name of Grazzano Badoglio.

== World War II ==
Badoglio was chief of staff from 1925 to 1940, and had the final say on the entire structure of the Armed Forces, including doctrine, selection of officers, and armaments, influencing the whole military environment. He did not oppose the decision of Mussolini and the King to declare war on France and Great Britain. Following the Italian army's poor performance in the invasion of Greece in December 1940, he resigned from the General Staff. He was replaced by Ugo Cavallero.

By early 1943, there was a widely held belief among the military elite that Italy needed to sign an armistice in order to exit the war. They also believed that Mussolini needed to be removed, as he was not willing to sign an armistice, nor were the Allies willing to sign an armistice with him. The two men considered to replace Mussolini were Marshal Badoglio and Marshal Enrico Caviglia. As Marshal Caviglia was one of the few Royal Army officers who was known to dislike Fascism, the king was unwilling to have him as prime minister. Victor Emmanuel wanted an officer who was committed to continuing the Fascist system, which led him to choose Badoglio, who had faithfully served Mussolini and committed an array of atrocities in Ethiopia, but who had a grudge against Mussolini for making him the scapegoat for the failed invasion of Greece in 1940. Moreover, Badoglio was an opportunist well known for his sycophancy towards those in power, which led the king to choose him as Mussolini's successor for he knew that Badoglio would do anything to have power, whereas Caviglia had a reputation as a man of principle and honour. In a secret meeting on 15 July 1943, Victor Emmanuel told Badoglio that he would soon be sworn in as Italy's new prime minister, and that the king wanted no "ghosts" (i.e. liberal politicians from the pre-fascist era) in his cabinet.

On 24 July 1943, as Italy had suffered several setbacks following the Allied invasion of Sicily, Mussolini summoned the Fascist Grand Council, which after Dino Grandi's proposal overwhelmingly voted no confidence in Mussolini. The following day, Mussolini was removed from government by King Victor Emmanuel III and arrested after leaving the king's premises. On 3 September 1943, after lengthy negotiations with the Allies, General Giuseppe Castellano signed the Italian armistice with the Allies in Cassibile on behalf of Badoglio, who was the Prime Minister of Italy. Wary of the potentially hostile German response to the Armistice and German military countermeasures, Badoglio agreed with the Allies to postpone the formal announcement of the Armistice treaty until the moment the Allies would start to land in mainland Italy, which was planned for 9 September.

On 8 September 1943, the armistice document was published by the Allies in the Badoglio Proclamation, while Badoglio himself had not informed the Italian armed forces. The units of the Italian Royal Army, Royal Navy, and Royal Air Force were thus generally surprised by the change and unprepared for swift German actions to disarm them. In the early hours of the following day, 9 September 1943, Badoglio, King Victor Emmanuel, some military ministers, and the chief of the general staff escaped by car from Rome to Pescara and then sailed on corvette "Bayonetta" to Brindisi seeking Allied protection.

On 29 September 1943, the longer version of the armistice was signed in Malta by both Badoglio and Eisenhower, commander of Allied Force Headquarters. On 13 October, Badoglio and the Kingdom of Italy officially declared war on Nazi Germany. Badoglio continued to head the government for another nine months. In June 1944 Badoglio resigned and on 18 June 1944, Ivanoe Bonomi was appointed to the post of prime minister.

== Final years ==
Due to increased tensions with the Soviet Union, the British government saw Badoglio as a guarantor of an anti-communist post-war Italy. Consequently, Badoglio was never tried for Italian war crimes committed in Africa.

== Personal Life ==
In 1904 Badoglio married Sofia Valania, who lived 1884 - 1942. They had 4 children together: Mario Ferdinando Antonio Luigi (1905 - 1953), Francesco Ferdinando, Paolo Fernando (1912 - 1941), and Maria Immacolata Luigia Antonia. Mario married Donna Giuliana Rota (1913 - 2001), and they had a son, Pietro Badoglio (1939 - 1992).

Because his eldest son died before him, his grandson inherited the honorific titles (although unofficial due to the Italian Republic's constitution) Duke of Addis Ababa and Marquess of Sabotino. Thus making Pietro Badoglio 2nd Duke of Addis Ababa and 2nd Marquess of Sabotino. He also married Phương Mai, the daughter of Bảo Đại, the last emperor of Vietnam.

Badoglio died in the comune of his birth, Grazzano Badoglio, on 1 November 1956.

== See also ==
- Italian Co-belligerent Army
- Military history of Italy during World War II
- Royal Italian Army
- Royal Italian Army during World War II

== Bibliography ==
- Pietro Badoglio: Italy in the Second World War, memories and documents. (Transl.: Muriel Currey). Oxford University Press, 1948. Repr. 1976, Greenwood Press: ISBN 0-8371-8485-1
- Pietro Badoglio: The war in Abyssinia. (Foreword: Benito Mussolini). London, Methuen Publishers, 1937.

== Notes ==
Military offices
Preceded by Armando Diaz	Chief of Staff of the Italian Army; 1919–1921	Succeeded by Giuseppe Vaccari
Position established	Chief of the Defence Staff; 1925–1940	Succeeded by Ugo Cavallero
Government offices
Preceded by Emilio De Bono as Commissary of Tripolitania	Commissary of Tripolitania and Cirenaica; 1929–1933	Succeeded by Italo Balbo as Governor of Libia
Preceded by Attilio Teruzzi as Commissary of Cyrenaica	Commissary of Tripolitania and Cirenaica; 1929–1933	Succeeded by Italo Balbo as Governor of Libia
Preceded by Emilio De Bono	Commissary of Eritrea; 1935–1936	Succeeded by Alfredo Guzzoni
Preceded by Emilio De Bono	Commissary of the Italian East Africa; 1935–1936	Position abolished
Positions established	Viceroy of the Italian East Africa; Viceroy of Ethiopia; 1936	Succeeded by Rodolfo Graziani
Preceded by Melchiade Gabba	Minister of the Italian Africa; 1944	Succeeded by Ivanoe Bonomi
Preceded by Raffaele Guariglia	Minister of Foreign Affairs; 1944	Succeeded by Ivanoe Bonomi
Academic offices
Preceded by Guglielmo Marconi	President of the National Research Council; 1937–1941	Succeeded by Giancarlo Vallauri
Political offices
Preceded by Benito Mussolini	Head of the Fascist Grand Council; 1943	Position abolished
Preceded by Benito Mussolini	Prime Minister of Italy; 1943–1944	Succeeded by Ivanoe Bonomi
Italian nobility
New title	Duke of Addis Abeba; 1936–1956	Succeeded by Pietro Badoglio, 2nd Duke of Addis Abeba
