= Marcello Amero D'Aste =

Italian politician

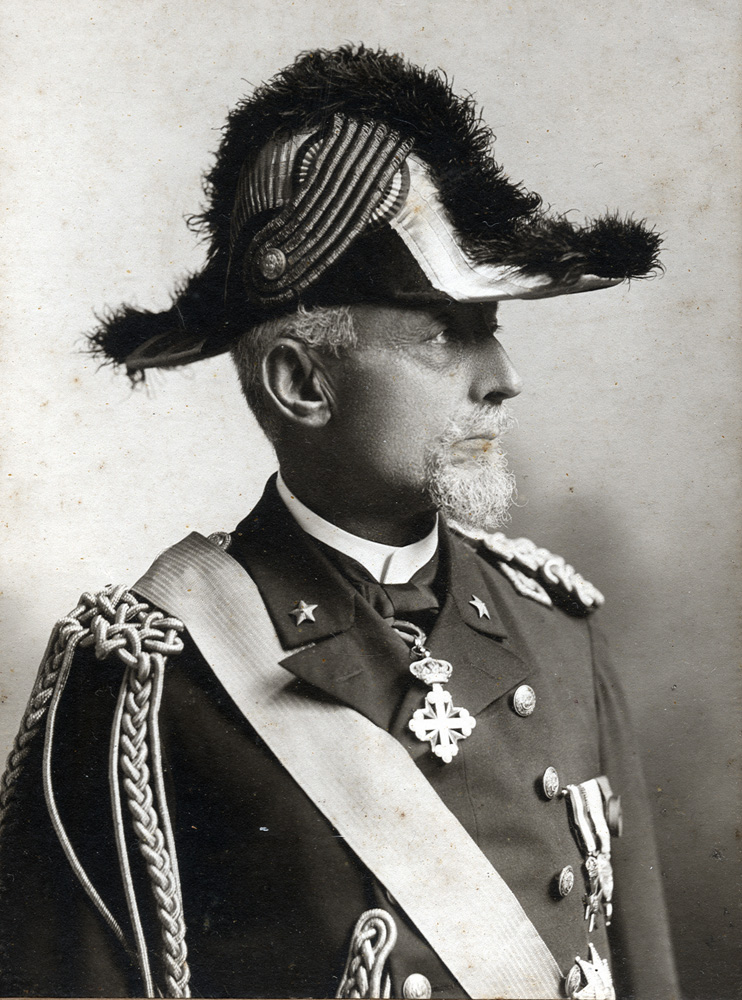
- Admiral Marcello Amero D'Aste
- Born: April 10, 1853; Leca, Albenga, Italy
- Died: September 17, 1931 (aged 78); Rome, Italy
- Military career
- Allegiance: Italy
- Branch: Marine
- Rank: Admiral
- Conflicts: Italo-Turkish War and World War I

Marcello Amero D’Aste Stella (April 10, 1853 – September 17, 1931) was an admiral of the Regia Marina (Royal Italian Navy) and later a politician.

He was born in Albenga, into a family with traditional connections to the Royal Sardinian Navy. He attended the Royal Naval School at Genoa (Regia Scuola Superiore Navale di Genova) from 1866 to 1871. By 1907 he was a counter admiral (rear admiral), and by 1911 a vice admiral.

At the beginning of the Italo-Turkish War he was secretary general of the Ministry of the Navy, carrying out organizational work. In April 1912, he took command of the second naval squadron, preparing for the first Dardanelles campaign of the war and participating in the occupation of Rhodes. In 1913, he took command of the first naval squadron.

At the beginning of World War I in August 1914, he appointed president of the High Council of the Navy, and in December 1914 senator of the kingdom.

He died in Rome.
