= Vincenzo Garioni =

Italian general

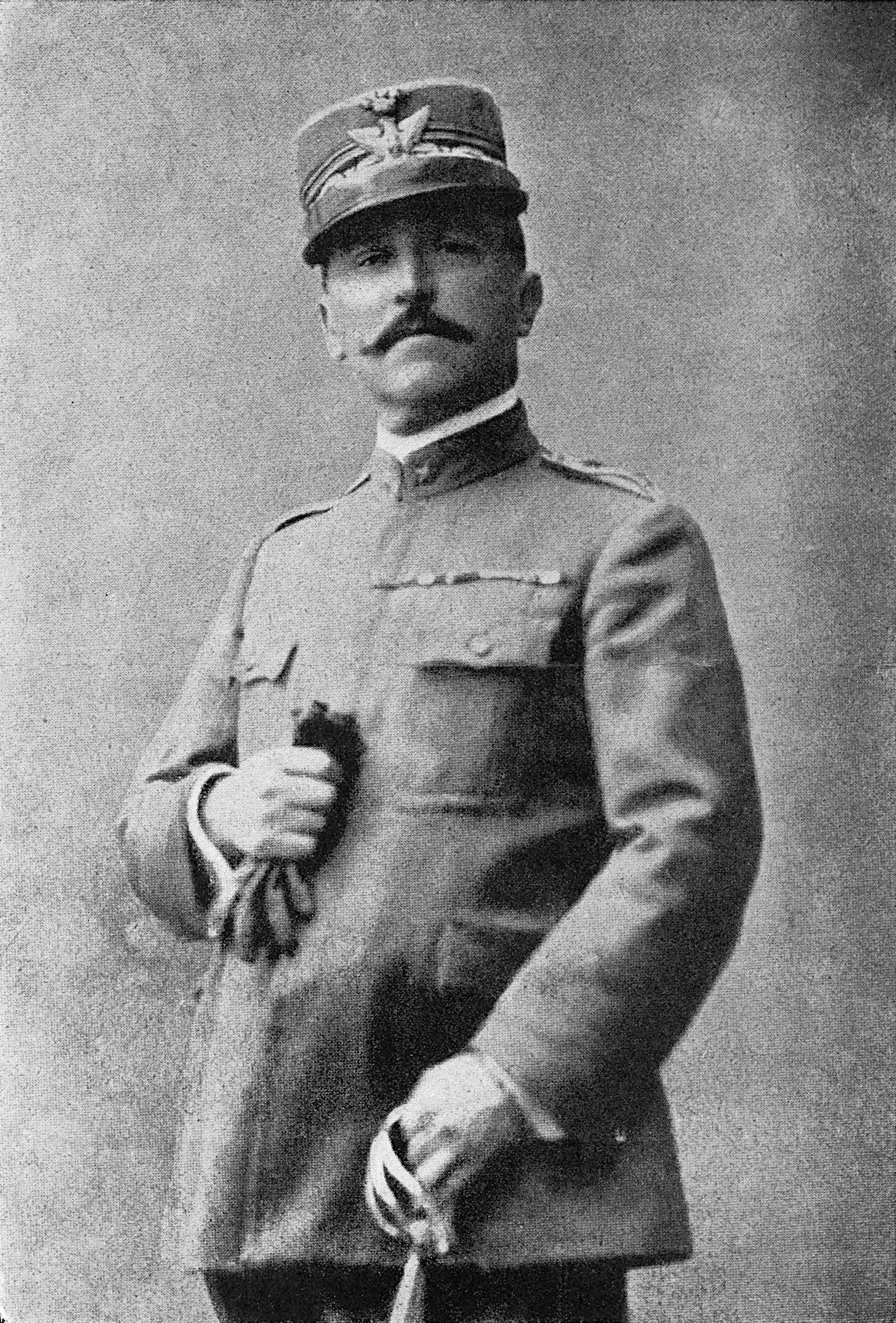
- Garioni in 1914.

Italian Governor of Tripolitania
- In office 2 June 1913 – 1 October 1914
- Preceded by: Ottavio Ragni
- Succeeded by: Giorgio Cigliana
- In office 5 August 1918 – 17 May 1919
- Preceded by: Giovanni Ameglio
- Succeeded by: Vittorio Menzinger

Italian Governor of Cyrenaica
- In office 5 August 1918 – 17 May 1919
- Preceded by: Giovanni Ameglio
- Succeeded by: Giacomo De Martino

Personal details
- Born: 19 November 1856 Biadene, Italy
- Died: April 24, 1929 (aged 72) Venice, Italy

Military service
- Allegiance: Kingdom of Italy
- Branch/service: Royal Army
- Years of service: 1875–1919
- Rank: Major general
- Commands: Italian Expeditionary Corps in China; Casale Brigade; Roma Brigade; Infantry Application School; Padova Division; 5th Special Division; VII Army Corps; 3rd Army; VI Army Corps; II Army Corps
- Battles/wars: Boxer Rebellion; Italo-Turkish War; World War I; Italian front; Battles of the Isonzo; North Africa

Vincenzo Garioni (19 November 1856 – 24 April 1929) was an Italian general who saw combat in the Boxer Rebellion, Italo-Turkish War, and World War I. He was the governor of Tripolitania from 1913 to 1914 and later served as the governor of both Tripolitania and Cyrenaica from 1918 to 1919.

== Biography ==
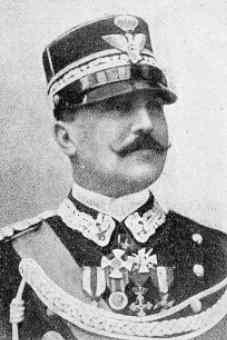
Garioni in 1900.

Garioni was born in Biadene, Italy, on 19 November 1856. He began his career in the Royal Army (Italian: Regio Esercito) as a second lieutenant in the Bersaglieri ("Sharpshooters") in 1875. After attending the War School, he assumed duty with the army general staff. Promoted to colonnello ("colonel"), he commanded of the Italian Expeditionary Corps in China, part of the expeditionary force of the Eight-Nation Alliance sent to China in 1900 to put down the Boxer Rebellion. From July 1902 to June 1905 he directed Office I. Subsequently, as a major general, he commanded the Casale Brigade, the Roma Brigade, and the Infantry Application School (Italian: Scuola di applicazione di fanteria) . In 1911 he was promoted to lieutenant general and briefly commanded of the Padua Division.

The Italo-Turkish War with the Ottoman Empire broke out in September 1911 when Italy invaded Libya, and Garioni participated in the war as commanding officer of the 5th Special Division, which included the 11th ‘’Bersaglieri’’ Regiment, 60th Infantry Regiment, 1st Grenadier Battalion, 28th ‘’Bersaglieri’’ Battalion, 6th and 7th Eritrean Battalions, three artillery batteries, and an engineering company, divided into two columns, one under the command of General Clemente Lequio and the other under Colonel General (later General) Alberto Cavaciocchi. Along with another veteran of the Boxer Rebellion, Luigi Agliardi, Garioni was assigned the task of conquering Zuwarah and Ghadames in western and northwestern Tripolitania on the border with Tunisia. During the campaign, he led the occupation of Sidi Said at the end of June 1912, then took the hill Sidi Alì, 6 kilometres (3.7 mi) east of Sidi Said, on 14 July 1912. On 15 August 1912 he moved inland and conquered Sidi Abd el-Samad, 8 kilometres (5 mi) from Zuwarah. Another column led by General Tullio Tassoni then arrived to assist his troops.

The war ended in Italy’s defeat of the Ottoman Empire in October 1912, and one of its results was the addition of the provinces of Tripolitania and Cyrenaica to the Italian Empire. In June 1913, Garioni was appointed governor of Italian Tripolitania, a position he held until the end of 1914, when he obtained command of the VII Army Corps in Ancona. In January 1915, the VII Army Corps brought relief to Avezzano and Fucino after they suffered severe damage in a major earthquake on 13 January.

When Italy entered World War I in May 1915, Garioni still was in command of the VII Army Corps at the time consisting of the 13th and 14th Divisions and the 2nd Artillery Regiment and briefly found himself temporarily in command of the 3rd Army until Prince Emanuele Filiberto, Duke of Aosta, arrived to take command of the army. Serving on the Italian front until 1918, he subsequently commanded the VI Army Corps and II Army Corps. He saw action in the various Battles of the Isonzo, and for his command’s crossing of the Isonzo at the Slovenian settlement of Plave (Italian: Plava) in June 1915 during the First Battle of the Isonzo he received the Silver Medal of Military Valor. His command of the II Army Corps included its participation under the 2nd Army in the Sixth Battle of the Isonzo in August 1916.

On 5 August 1918 Garioni again became governor of Tripolitania as well as governor regent of Cyrenaica. He arrived in Tripoli in Tripolitania on 18 August 1918 tasked with crushing an Arab revolt. After the Allied defeat of Ottoman and German Empire forces in the Battle of Megiddo in Palestine in September 1918 and of Austria-Hungary in the Battle of Vittorio Veneto on the Italian front in late October and early November 1918, Ottoman and German military advisers to the Arab rebel forces in Tripolitania and Cyrenaica abandoned them, leaving them torn by internal strife. Arab rebel attacks against Italian garrisons in Tripolitania and Cyrenaica declined, allowing Garioni to seize the initiative and put down the rebellion.

Relinquishing both governorships on 17 May 1919, Garioni returned to Italy. He retired from active service that year and died at Venice on 24 April 1929.

== Honors and awards ==
- Commander of the Order of the Crown of Italy
- Officer of the Order of Saints Maurice and Lazarus
- Knight of the Military Order of Savoy (10 July 1901)
- Commander of the Military Order of Savoy (16 March 1913)
- Silver Medal of Military Valor for passage of the Isonzo to Plave (Italian: Plava), June 1915
- Commemorative Medal of the Campaign in China (1900–1901)
- Commemorative Medal for the Italo-Turkish War 1911–1912
- Commemorative Cross of the 3rd Army (unofficial medal)
- Medal of Merit for the Avezzano Earthquake of 1915
- Cross for Length of Military Service (40 years)
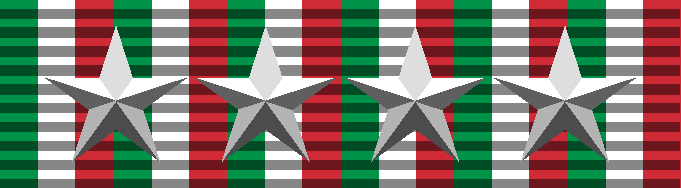
- Commemorative Medal for the Italo-Austrian War 1915–1918 (four years of campaign)
- Commemorative Medal of the Unity of Italy
- Allied Victory Medal
