= Luigi Pintor (politician, born 1882) =

Italian jurist and politician

Italian Governor of Cyrenaica
- In office 23 November 1921 – October 1922
- Preceded by: Giacomo De Martino
- Succeeded by: Eduardo Baccari

Personal details
- Born: 21 June 1882 Cagliari
- Died: 3 September 1925 (aged 43) Chamonix

Luigi Pintor (21 June 1882 – 3 September 1925) was an Italian jurist and politician. He had been governor of Cyrenaica from 1921 to 1922.

Before that, he had represented the Italian government at the negotiations with the Senussi that led to the accords of Acroma in 1917.
