= Polish invasion of Russia =

Polish invasion of Russia or Polish invasion of Rus may refer to

- Bolesław I's intervention in the Kievan succession crisis (1018) (the Kiev Expedition)
- Polish–Russian War (1609–1618)
- Polish–Soviet War (1919–20)

== See also ==
- List of armed conflicts involving Poland against Russia
