= Commemorative Medal of the Campaign in China =

Italian military award

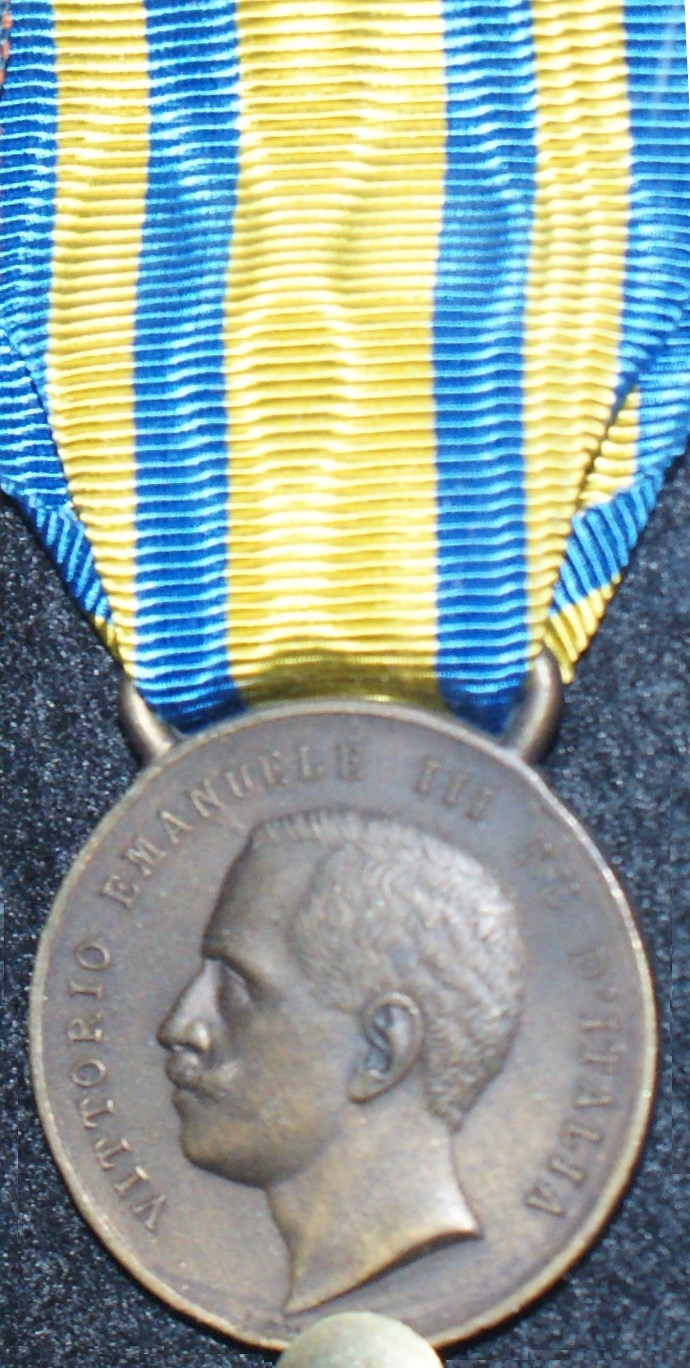
- The obverse of the medal.
- Type: Commemorative medal
- Awarded for: Service in China during the intervention against the Boxer Rebellion in 1900–1901
- Presented by: Kingdom of Italy
- Eligibility: Royal Army, Regia Marina, and civilian personnel
- Status: Abolished 10 February 2011
- Established: 23 June 1901

Highlights
- Total: 2,325
- Ribbon of the medal

Commemorative Medal of the Campaign in China "China" variant
- Type: Commemorative medal
- Awarded for: Service in China between 1 January 1902 and 31 March 1908 or for Regia Marina service in Korea between 9 January 1904 and 31 March 1908
- Presented by: Kingdom of Italy
- Eligibility: Royal Army, Regia Marina, and civilian personnel
- Status: Abolished 10 February 2011
- Established: 23 April 1903

Highlights
- Total: 736
- Ribbon of the medal

The Commemorative Medal of the Campaign in China was a decoration granted by the Kingdom of Italy to personnel who served in 1900–1901 in the military campaign of the Eight-Nation Alliance, which intervened in the Boxer Rebellion in China to relieve the siege of the International Legations in Peking, and its immediate aftermath. A "China" variant of the medal later was created to recognize service on occupation duty in China between 1902 and 1908. Both variants of the medal were abolished in 2011 after the Italian Republic deemed them obsolete.

== Background ==
The Boxer Rebellion was an anti-colonialist and anti-Christian movement of the Society of Righteous and Harmonious Fists (Yìhéquán), known in English as the "Boxers," which took place in China between November 1899 and 7 September 1901. The uprising was a reaction to Western and Japanese imperialist expansion in China that included European opium merchants, political invasion, economic manipulation, and missionary evangelization. In 1898, local organizations in Shantung (now Shandong) rebelled in response to both imperialist expansion and internal Chinese problems such as the Qing dynasty's fiscal crisis and natural disasters. Initially the Qing dynasty repressed the rebellion, but the dynasty later attempted to take advantage of the rebellion to free China from foreign influence. With the slogan "Support the Qing, destroy the foreigners" ("扶清灭洋"), the Boxers attacked missionary settlements throughout northern China. Many thousands of Chinese Christians were killed because the Boxers considered them responsible for foreign domination in China.

The foreign powers whose commercial interests in China were threatened did not take long to react to the Boxer uprising. By the end of May 1900, ships of the British Royal Navy, Italian Regia Marina ("Royal Navy"), and United States Navy were at anchor off Tientsin (now Tianjin), the port in northeastern China closest to Peking (now Beijing), and a first armed contingent composed of 75 French, 75 Russian, 75 British, 60 American, 50 German, 40 Italian, and 30 Austro-Hungarian military personnel were marching toward Peking.

In June 1900 Boxer fighters, either lightly armed or unarmed, gathered in Peking to besiege the foreign embassies there, killing 230 foreigners, including many diplomats. Foreign diplomats, civilians, and military personnel and some Chinese Christians retreated to the Peking Legation Quarter, where they endured a siege of the International Legations for 55 days. On 21 June 1900, the conservative party in the Chinese Imperial Court induced Empress Dowager Cixi, who ruled China in the emperor's name, to declare war on foreign powers that had diplomatic representation in Peking. Meanwhile, Austria-Hungary, the British Empire, France, the German Empire, the Kingdom of Italy, the Japanese Empire, the Russian Empire, and the United States formed the Eight-Nation Alliance to intervene in the rebellion and relieve the siege. On 5 July 1900 the Italian parliament authorized the creation of a relief force of around 2,000 men under the command of Collonnello ("Colonel") Vincenzo Garioni. Ultimately, the alliance brought a force of 20,000 armed military personnel – the Gaselee Expedition – to Peking, which lifted the siege of the legations in the Battle of Peking on 14–15 October 1900 and then occupied the city. The Eight-Nation Alliance was responsible for the looting of many historical artifacts of Chinese origin, such as those found in the Summer Palace, and instigated the burning of many important Chinese buildings in an attempt to rout the Boxer rebels.

Empress Dowager Cixi, the emperor, and the highest officials of the Chinese government fled from the imperial palace at the Forbidden City in Peking to Hsi-an (now Xian) and sent Li Hongzhang to begin peace negotiations. The Boxer Protocol of 7 September 1901 finally ended the uprising and provided for severe punishment of China, including compensation of £67 million in the form of 450 million taels of silver, to be paid over the course of 39 years to the eight countries of the alliance. This greatly weakened the Qing dynasty, which eventually was overthrown in the 1911 Revolution, which led to the creation of the Republic of China.

== History ==
King Victor Emmanuel III of Italy established the Commemorative Medal of the Campaign in China with a royal decree of 23 June 1901 to commemorate participation in the Italian intervention in China against the Boxers in 1900–1901. With a royal decree of 23 April 1903, the king established the "China" variant of the medal to recognize occupation service in China between 1902 and 1908.

After deeming the medal obsolete, the Italian Republic abolished it with a legislative decree on 13 December 2010. The abolition took effect on 10 February 2011.

The medal was minted by the mint in Rome, as well as by other companies that obtained a contract to produce it. A total of 2,325 examples of the medal were awarded, and today it is one of the rarest in the world of Italian collecting.

== Eligibiity ==
=== Original medal ===
Eligibility for the original medal extended to:

- Personnel of the Italian Royal Army (Italian: Regio Esercito) who took part in the expedition against the Boxers in 1900 or the subsequent protection of the embassies in Peking during 1900–1901;
- Personnel of the Regia Marina ("Royal Navy") who served ashore in China during these operations;
- Personnel aboard ships of the Regia Marina′s Oceanic Naval Force (Italian: Forza Navale Oceanica) or Italian government-chartered steamers which operated off China north of 22 degrees north latitude during these operations; and
- Civilians who in any way contributed to the military operations of the expeditionary force in China.

Eligibility for the original medal did not extend to service later than 31 December 1901.

=== "China" variant ===
Eligibility for the "China" variant of the medal extended to Royal Army, Regia Marina, and civilian personnel who served in China on or after 1 January 1902, provided they were considered to be on a "war footing" while there. Royal Decree Number 195 of 21 April 1904 declared that personnel of the Regia Marina who served on the Korean Peninsula after 9 January 1904 were "on a war footing" and also eligible for the "China" variant.

A royal decree of 15 March 1908 set 31 March 1908 as the final date for service in China or Korea to be eligible for the "China" variant. A total of 736 examples of the "China" variant were awarded.

== Appearance ==
=== Original medal ===
The medal consisted of a bronze disc 32 millimetres (1¼ inches) in diameter bearing on the obverse the face of King Victor Emmanuel III facing right, encircled by the inscription "VITTORIO EMANUELE III RE D'ITALIA" (VICTOR EMMANUEL III KING OF ITALY), with the words Regia Zecca ("Royal Mint") inscribed under the king's neck. On the reverse was the inscription "CINA 1900–1901" (CHINA 1900–1901) surrounded by two laurel branches in the form of a crown tied at the bottom with a ribbon.

=== "China" variant ===
The "China" variant of the medal was identical to the original medal, except that the inscription on the reverse was simply "CINA" ("CHINA"), with no indication of dates.

=== Ribbon ===
Both versions of the medal were worn on the left side of the chest, suspended from a ribbon that was 37 millimetres (1.5 in) wide, yellow-gold in color, with blue edges 3 millimetres (0.12 in) wide and crossed by two vertical lines, also blue, 5 millimetres (0.20 in) wide and 10 millimetres (0.39 in) apart.

The founding decree for the medal of 1901 prohibited wearing the ribbon without the medal, but Royal Decree Number 470 of 29 July 1906 authorized bearers of either version of the medal to wear only the ribbon.

=== Clasp ===
Royal Decree Number 96 of 15 March 1908 established a silver clasp for the original medal bearing the inscription "CINA 1900–1901" ("CHINA 1900–1901") and mandated that it be worn on the ribbon of the original medal to distinguish it from the "China" variant of the medal.

== See also ==
- Italian Expeditionary Corps in China
- 1901 China expedition commemorative medal
- China Campaign Medal
- China Medal (German Empire)
- China Relief Expedition Medal
- China War Medal (1900)
- Transport Medal
