= Cross for Length of Military Service =

Italian military award

The Cross for Length of Military Service (Italian: Croce per anzianità di servizio militare) is a military medal created by the Kingdom of Italy which then passed to the Italian Republic. Created in 1900 and updated or reformed in 1953, 1966, 1972, and 2010, it is a seniority award which recognizes lengthy honorable service in the Italian armed forces.

== Kingdom of Italy ==
Cross for Length of Military Service
- Type: Medal for long service
- Awarded for: 16, 25, or 40 years of service
- Presented by: Kingdom of Italy (1900–1946); Italian Republic (1946–1953)
- Eligibility: Military personnel
- Status: Updated 10 February 1953
- Established: 8 November 1900

=== History ===
King Victor Emmanuel III created the Cross for Length of Military Service by royal decree on 8 November 1900 to decorate military personnel of all ranks of the Regio Esercito ("Royal Army") and Regia Marina ("Royal Navy") for long and meritorious service. When created in 1900, it replaced the by-then-obsolete Piedmontese-style chevrons of the uniforms of the era of King Umberto I, standardizing the decoration on a larger scale in step with the evolution of Italian military uniforms.

=== Eligibility ===
The Cross for Length of Military Service was a seniority medal, awarded strictly for length of honorable service. When created in 1900, it was divided into three classes, but a fourth class was added by royal decree on 15 June 1912. The four classes were:

- Silver cross for enlisted personnel who had served for 16 years;
- Silver cross surmounted by the royal crown of Italy for enlisted personnel who had served for 25 years (added in 1912);
- Gold cross for officers who had served for 25 years;
- Gold cross surmounted by the royal crown of Italy for officers who had served for 40 years.

=== Appearance ===
==== Medal ====
The medal consists of a Maltese cross in gold or silver, depending on the class, with a disc in the center bearing the crowned monogram of Vittorio Emanuele III ("VE") on the obverse and the years of service in Roman numerals on the reverse ("XVI", "XXV", or "XL"). The crowned crosses are surmounted by the royal crown of Italy in silver or gold, also depending on the class.

==== Ribbon ====
The medal was hung on the chest with a green silk ribbon, divided down the middle by a white stripe. A gold (for the gold cross) or silver (for the silver cross) crown on the ribbon with a diameter of 6 millimetres (0.24 in) distinguishes the crosses with crowns from those without when only the ribbon is worn. The founding royal decree of 1900 did not allow wearing of the ribbon without the medal, but a royal decree of 1906 modified this, giving the bearer the right to wear only the ribbon.

Ribbons
| Silver Cross for non-commissioned officers and enlisted personnel (16 years) | Silver Cross with Royal Crown for non-commissioned officers and enlisted personnel (25 years) | Gold Cross for officers (25 years) | Gold Cross with Royal Crown for officers (40 years) |

== Italian Republic ==
Cross for Length of Military Service
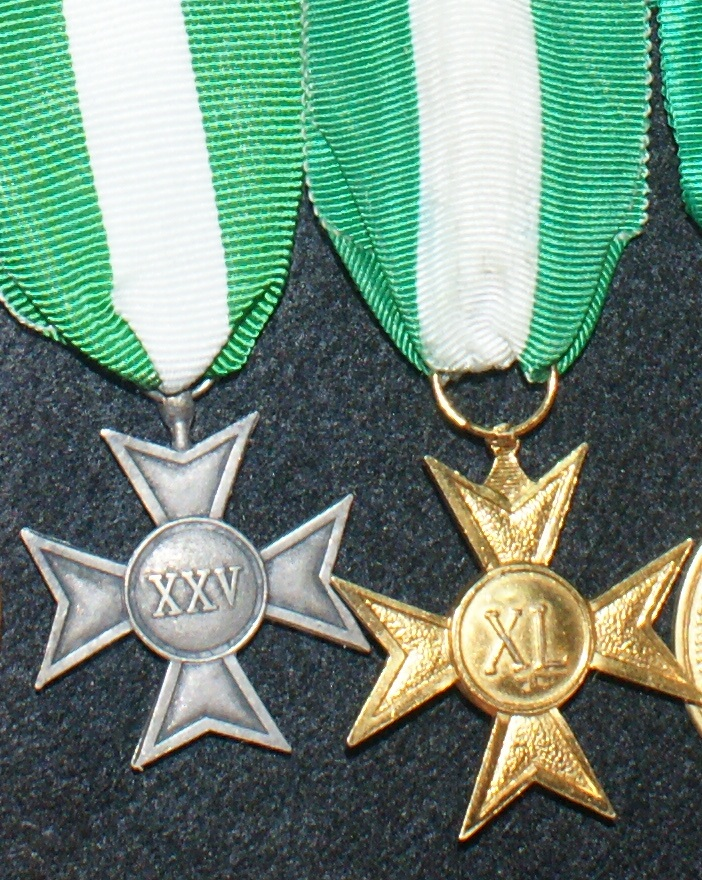
- The reverse of the Silver Cross for enlisted personnel for 25 years of service (left) and the reverse of the Gold Cross for officers and non-commissioned officers for 40 years of service.
- Type: Medal for long service
- Awarded for: 16, 25, or 40 years of service
- Presented by: Italian Republic
- Eligibility: Military personnel
- Status: Reformed 15 March 2010
- Established: 10 February 1953

=== History ===
The Kingdom of Italy's legislation governing the Cross for Length of Military Service remained in force even after the fall of the monarchy and birth of the Italian Republic on 2 June 1946. The Italian Republic first defined its version of the medal only in 1953. A 1966 reform established that the cross was awarded to officers, non-commissioned officers, and enlisted personnel of the Italian Army (Italian: ’’Esercito Italiano’’), Italian Navy (Italian: ’’Marina Militare’’), and Italian Air Force (Italian: ’’Aeronautica Militare’’) and had the following classes:

- Silver Cross for officers, non-commissioned officers, and enlisted personnel who had served for 16 years;
- Silver Cross with star for enlisted personnel who had served for 25 years;
- Gold Cross for officers and non-commissioned officers who had served for 25 years;
- Gold Cross with star for officers and non-commissioned officers who had served for 40 years.

=== Appearance ===
==== Medal ====
The Italian Republic's 1953 legislation altered the appearance of the medal from that awarded by the Kingdom of Italy. The republic continued the practice of awarding a Maltese cross in gold and silver, depending on the class, but eliminated the crowns above the crosses and replaced the royal monogram "VE" on the obverse of the kingdom's medal with the abbreviation "RI" (for Italian: ”’’Repubblica italiana’’” — "Italian Republic") in a disc in the center of the cross. On the reverse, the republic continued the practice of indicating the number of years of service in Roman numerals ("XVI", "XXV", or "XL"). The Maltese cross is 32 millimetres (1.3 in) wide.

==== Ribbon ====
The ribbon is 37 millimetres (1.5 in) wide and identical to the kingdom's ribbon in that it is green with a white stripe in the middle. However, in the 1953 legislation, the republic eliminated the crown from the ribbon and replaced it with a 6-millimetre-wide (0.24 in) star when required by the class of the medal, in either gold or silver, depending on the class of the medal.

In 1972 a gold turreted crown was introduced, 4 millimetres (0.16 in) high and 6 millimetres (0.24 in) wide at the top, tapering to 4 millimetres (0.16 in) wide at the base, to be affixed to the ribbon of the Gold Cross for officers and non-commissioned officers with 25 years of service.

Ribbons
| Silver Cross for officers, non-commissioned officers, and enlisted personnel (16 years) | Silver Cross with star for enlisted personnel (25 years) | Gold Cross for officers and non-commissioned officers (25 years) (1953–1972) | Gold Cross with crown for officers and non-commissioned officers (25 years) (1972–present) | Gold Cross with Star for officers and non-commissioned officers (40 years) |

=== 2010 reform ===
Cross for Length of Military Service
- Type: Medal for long service
- Awarded for: 16, 25, or 40 years of service
- Presented by: Italian Republic
- Eligibility: Military personnel
- Status: Current
- Established: 15 March 2010

Legislative Decree Number 66 of 2010 repealed all existing legislation regarding the Cross for Length of Military Service under Article 2268 and absorbed it under Article 1464 into Articles 857 and 858 of the Regolamento ("Regulation") without substantial changes. It continued the authorization for personnel to wear the ribbons without the respective medals unless the medal is expressly required.

The 2010 reform also made a distinction between graduati (literally “graduates,” an Italian military term roughly corresponding to "junior non-commissioned officers") and non-commissioned officers of a higher rank, corresponding to what other countries might consider "senior non-commissioned officers." It redefined eligibility as follows:

- Silver Cross for officers, non-commissioned officers, graduati, and enlisted personnel with 16 years of service.
- Silver Cross with star for graduati and enlisted personnel with 25 years of service;
- Gold Cross for officers and non-commissioned officers with 25 years of service;
- Gold Cross with star for officers and non-commissioned officers with 40 years of service.

Ribbons
| Silver Cross for officers, non-commissioned officers, graduati, and enlisted personnel (16 years) | Silver Cross with star for graduati and enlisted personnel (25 years) | Gold Cross with crown for officers and non-commissioned officers (25 years) | Gold Cross with Star for officers and non-commissioned officers (40 years) |
