= Giovanni Ameglio =

Italian general (1854–1921)

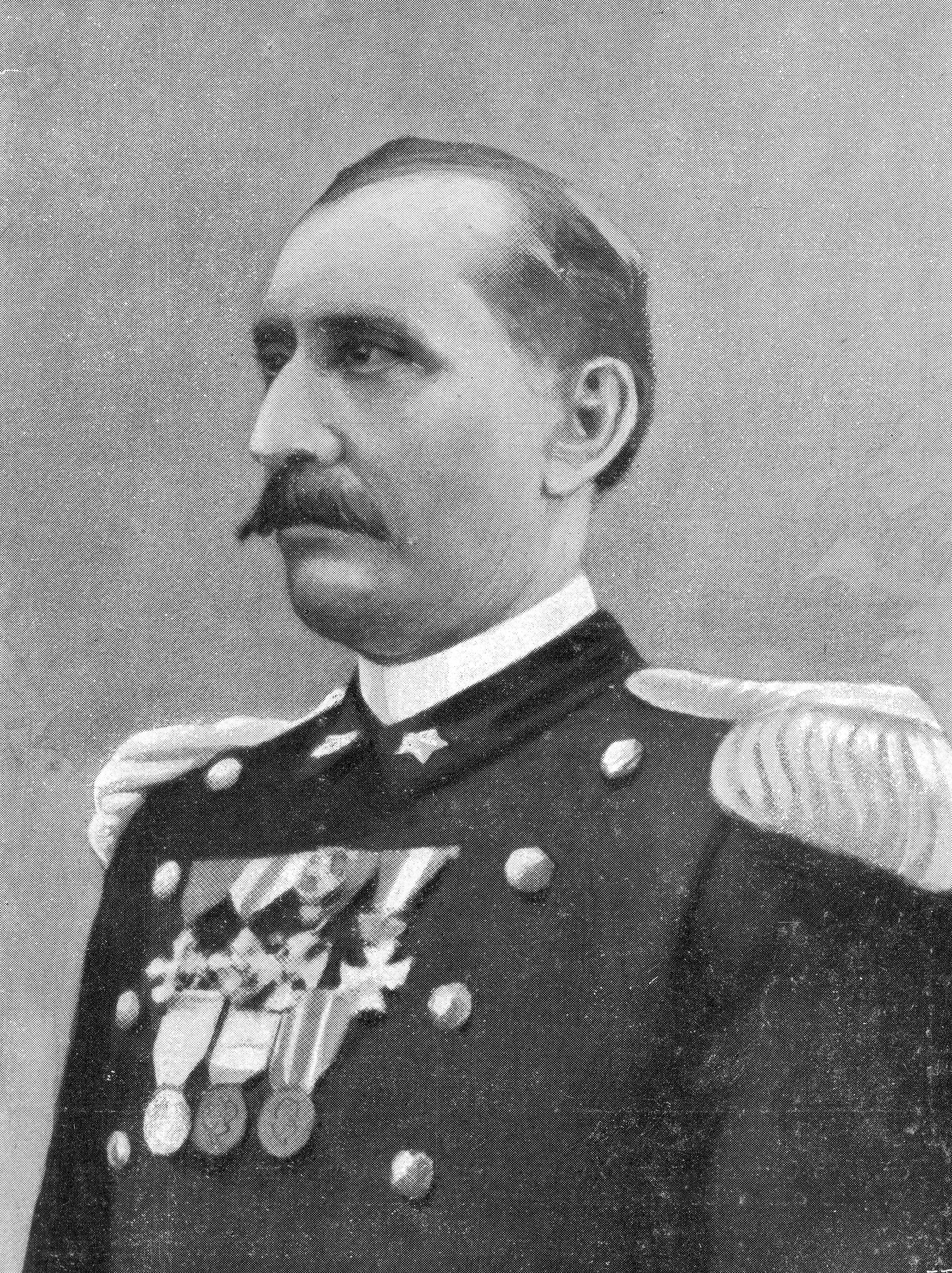

Italian Governor of Cyrenaica
- In office October 1913 – 5 August 1918
- Preceded by: Ottavio Briccola
- Succeeded by: Vincenzo Garioni

Italian Governor of Tripolitania
- In office 1915 – 5 August 1918
- Preceded by: Giulio Cesare Tassoni
- Succeeded by: Vincenzo Garioni

Italian Governor of Aegean Islands
- In office 5 May 1912 – 14 October 1913
- Succeeded by: Ferruccio Trombi

Personal details
- Born: 29 October 1854 Palermo, Kingdom of the Two Sicilies
- Died: 29 December 1921 (aged 67) Rome

Giovanni Battista Ameglio (1854-1921) was an Italian general. He was the governor of Cyrenaica between (1913-1918), and in 1915, while still at office, was assigned as governor of Tripolitania.

Earlier, as a military commander, he had led the conquest of Rhodes from the Ottomans in 1912.
