= P Service =

Organization of the Royal Italian Army

The P Service (Italian: Servizio P) was an organization set up for propaganda, surveillance and troop welfare within the Royal Italian Army. It was commissioned at the beginning of 1918 by the Italian High Command. Under the leadership of Luigi Cadorna it was not thought important to deploy propaganda to motivate or educate the soldiers. After the defeat at Caporetto, The new commander Armando Diaz appreciated the need to motivate his soldiers.

== The impact of Caporetto ==
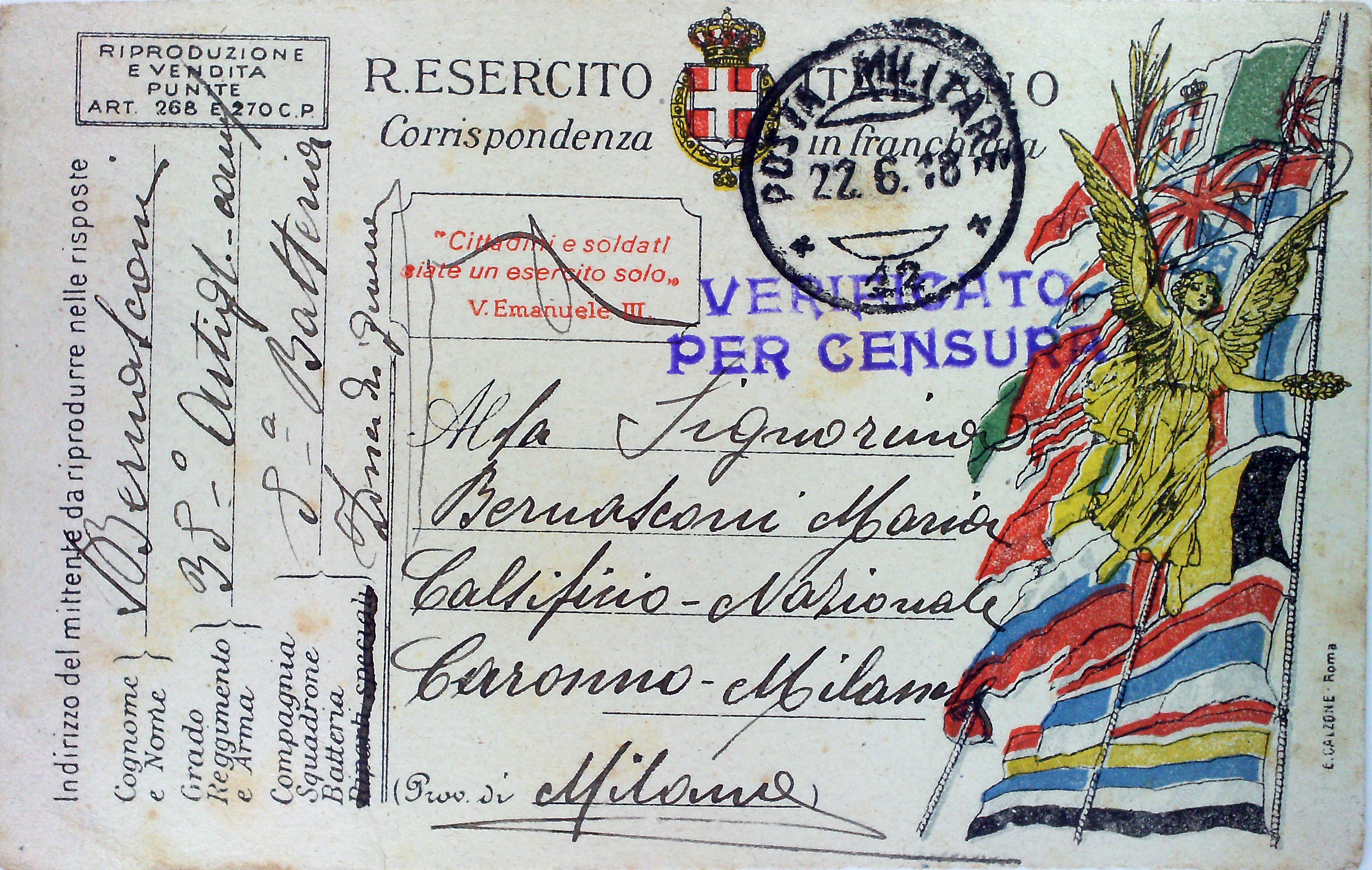
Military postal card WWI 1918

As well as being a serious military defeat, Caporetto was interpreted as a failure of Italian society as a whole and above all of the political direction of the army; the soldiers were largely unaware of the aims of the war in which they were fighting. After Caporetto, for the first time, large sums were allocated to propaganda for the army, and the new P Service as set up to deliver it. This service had the task of watching over the morale, wellbeing and mental condition of the soldiers, assisting them in communicating with their families and motivating them to fight. For this task several hundred special men designated "P" officers were drafted into the army. The P Service proved to be of great importance during the final decisive months of the war, bringing significant improvements in the moral and material conditions of the soldiers who had previously been subjected to a punitive regime of absolute obedience. After Caporetto, P officers established trench newspapers, developed the network of Soldiers' Houses and organised classes to combat illiteracy.

== Organization ==
In March 1918 the first propaganda services began to be set up within Italy's armies. The officers in charge were variously called "liaison officers with the front lines", then "consultant" officers, "IP" officers (Information and Propaganda) and finally more simply "P" officers. It was Badoglio who took on the task of rebuilding army morale, building on many of the ideas of the former commander Capello. Badoglio went beyond Capello's initiatives however, recommending a "spiritual bond" between officers and soldiers. From March 1918, a surveillance and propaganda system was in operation at the information offices of the different armies, and in May the High Command issued a circular which unified these structures, and adopted the name "Servizio P" across the board, following the example of the 1st Army. Two offices were established in the High Command to which the P services of the individual armies reported. One was the information office, which had a "P section" responsible for monitoring the morale of the troops. The other was the press and propaganda office, which had a "P section" responsible for preparing printed material to be dropped on the enemy and for providing assistance and propaganda to the Italian military. The officers who signed most of the circulars on the P Service were Badoglio, the head of the information service, Colonel Odoardo Marchetti, and the head of the press and propaganda office, Lieutenant Colonel it:Eugenio Barbarich. Under these two offices, a P section operated in each separate army, with a degree of autonomy. These P Sections issued directives for the service, as well as coordinating and supervising the work of subsections. In addition to providing advice to P officers they also printed factsheets, commentaries, “talking points” and “meeting ideas” for them. In addition, every fifteen days the P section of the army sent a report to High Command on the work done and on the morale of the soldiers. Within each army there were P officers assigned at every level. In each division, regiment, group, battalion, or other unit, an officer was in charge of carrying out the directives issued by the higher bodies. These officers therefore created a trust network among the troops for surveillance purposes and a core of collaborators for propaganda work. These officers sent periodic reports to their own P subsections, copied to the command to which they were seconded. As well as transmitting messages from headquarters, they monitored information from the postal censorship offices, military lawyers and health directors, passing up indicators of the troops’ mood and wellbeing. They also received and redistributed goodwill parcels donated by the public and by charities or other entities. This allowed them to maintain close contact with the troops. It is estimated that by the autumn of 1918 there were around one thousand P officers operating throughout Italy's armies. This number increased after the armistice as the officers were assigned to carry out propaganda investigations among the population of the occupied territories.

== P-Services in each army ==
Before the High Command issued the order for a single organizational structure, propaganda services were left to the initiative of each individual army. The 3rd Army under Emanuele Filiberto, 2nd Duke of Aosta and the 4th Army under Mario Nicolis di Robilant were pioneers in this regard.

=== 1st Army ===
The 1st Army of Guglielmo Pecori Giraldi set up its surveillance and propaganda service on 31 March, which it called the "P service". This later became the official term used for all the various offices in the different armies. As well as the name, the 1st Army came closest to the concept that was later used by the High Command. "Liaison officers with the front lines" were created, and numbered about thirty for each of the three army corps by May 1918, or a total of one hundred officers. The 1st Army issued directives to ensure that the P officers were able to capture the morale and mood of the men before, during and after action, in order to be able to promptly warn of any potential crisis. Propaganda to boost morale was left to the judgment of the officers themselves. Assistance for the troops was limited to control of food distribution, care of the wounded and the writing of letters of comfort to the families of the fallen and those hospitalized with serious conditions.

=== 2nd Army ===
After Caporetto the remains of the old 2nd Army commanded by Capello were reconstituted with new recruits into the new 5th Army. The new 2nd Army was built beyond the Piave with new corps under General it:Giuseppe Pennella. On March 22, 1918, he set up a propaganda service called the "consulting service", while the department in the information office was called the "consulting section", with "consultant officers". Little is known of the workings of these services and from 1 June Enrico Caviglia assumed command, bringing in Giuseppe Lombardo Radice from the 1st Army to lead the service. In October Caviglia issued regulations requiring the P officer of each subsection to send daily reports and emphasising the critical importance of vigilance. To reinforce this point, the Royal Carabinieri were brought in to supervise the personnel of the P offices.

=== 3rd Army ===
In April 1918 the intelligence service of the 3rd Army approved lectures by civilian and non-military speakers to strengthen the morale of the men, and began a widespread distribution of patriotic material.

=== 4th Army ===
In January 1918 the 4th Army set up a "propaganda office" at the army command to assist the officers of lower commands chosen to talk to the soldiers. They gave lectures to encourage the soldiers to talk to their comrades, spreading conversational themes and trying to make propaganda more acceptable. The initiatives of the 3rd and 4th armies, combined with Capello's 2nd Army, were limited to propaganda and did not involve troop support or surveillance.

=== 5th Army ===
The 5th Army was created from the remains of the old 2nd Army. After an initial period under Giulio Cesare Tassoni, command was assumed by Mario Nicolis di Robilant, who set up divisional propaganda centers called "specialized executive bodies". These had propaganda tasks, but we’re not responsible for vigilance over the soldiers. In May 1918, after Paolo Morrone had taken over from Nicolis di Robilant, the 5th Army was renamed the 9th Army. A circular on 7 June provided for a continuation of the surveillance and propaganda service of the old 5th Army, called the "VP service", a section of the information office called the "VP department" and a section at the large units and the Army Intendency called the "Propaganda Center". The officers attached to these offices were known as "VP service officers". It was this circular, read by Barbarich, that persuaded the High Command to establish general provisions to make the P services across the armies standard.

=== 6th-12th Armies ===
When the 6th Army of Luca Montuori was formed on 1 March with four corps, three of them came from the 1st Army, and they maintained the same P service structure as that army. The 7th Army of it:Giulio Tassoni waited until 10 August before setting up a surveillance and propaganda service. There is no known documentation about any possible propaganda services in the 10th Army under the Earl of Cavan or the 12th under Jean César Graziani, but it is conceivable that the XI and I corps, when they were moved to these armies, brought with them the P service organisations they had established when they were part of the 3rd and 4th Armies.

== Trench newspapers ==
On 1 February 1918 the High Command issued circular 1117 / P concerning patriotic propaganda and this document is widely considered as the starting point of the P Service. On 29 March Colonel Odoardo Marchetti issued a second circular N. 2293 / SI Section U, which approved the dissemination of political newspapers and the circulation of trench newspapers.

First World War trench newspapers in Italy'
Title	Distribution	Authors and illustrators	Notes
Il 13	XIII Army Corps		First issue 12 May 1918, last issue 15 October (16 editions)
L'Astico (name of a river in Veneto; also means ‘shrimp’)	9th Division	Piero Jahier; Emilio Cecchi it:Giuseppe Lombardo Radice	The newspaper's founder-editor used to sign his articles barba Piero (uncle Piero in Genoese dialect). At the end of the war the paper changed its name to Il Nuovo Contadino but ran out of money after eleven editions).
La Baionetta (“The Bayonet”)	Emilia Brigade	Cellini	First edition 14 February 1918
Bianco Rosso Verde (“White Red Green”)			Fortnightly
Il Fifaus (“The Bomb Shelter”)	XIII Army Corps		
Il Ghibli (“The Scirocco”)	For units stationed in Libya		
Il Montello (“The Hillock”)	Infantry on the middle Piave front	Mario Sironi; Massimo Bontempelli	Fortnightly, first edition 20 September 1918
La Ghirba (“The Waterskin”)	5th Army	Ardengo Soffici (editor); Giorgio de Chirico; Carlo Carrà	Later intended for soldiers of the 9th Army
Il Razzo (“The Rocket”)	7th Army		
Resistere (“Resisting”)	Volturno Brigade		
Il Respiratore (“The Breather”)	94th Regiment of Infantry		
San Marco	VIII Army Corps		Quarterly
Sempre Avanti (“Always Forward”)	II Army Corps	Giuseppe Ungaretti; Curzio Malaparte	Circulated in France in 1918
La Tradotta (“The Troop Train”)	3rd Army	Renato Simoni, founder-editor) it:Arnaldo Fraccaroli; Antonio Rubino it:Enrico Sacchetti	25 editions published, 42,000 copies
La Trincea (“The Trench”)	4th Army		
La Voiussa (name of river in Albania)	Units in Albania		
La Volontà (“The Will”)			Published fortnightly from 15 September 1918
La Giberna (“The Cartridge Case”)			43 issues published weekly from March 3, 1918, to January 5, 1919, for 43 issues. Following the success of the readers' column, on June 16, 1918, a new newspaper La Giberna dei lettori came out with writings and drawings by soldiers.

Trench newspapers had existed since as early as 1915, but their publication was not organised and wide use was not made of them. Between the end of February and the beginning of March 1918 Italy began to copy the propaganda initiatives already undertaken in other armies. Austria-Hungary army was filling the Italian trenches with posters and leaflets; the government of the United States had shown great skill in mobilizing American public opinion for war, while the other allies were by now well advanced in the work of developing counter-propaganda towards the enemy. Italy was behind in every respect, and trench newspapers only appeared regularly and at scale in 1918. The first large circulation paper was La Tradotta, the weekly of the 3rd Army, which appeared on 21 March, and in the same month army intelligence service started La Giberna. Next was La Ghirba of the 5th Army. To these were added many others, linked to gradually smaller units, eventually numbering around fifty in total. At the same time, the distribution of a large quantity of national newspapers was authorized, but only after the military authorities had agreed with the publishers to include articles suitable for propaganda among the troops. The army bought copies in bulk for 7.5 cents each, selling them on to the troops for 10 cents; if they were given away free the soldiers would not have trusted what they read. Levels of illiteracy at the time created doubts about the effectiveness of trench newspapers; by the summer of 1918 the High Command had lost much of its confidence in them, and began recommending the suspension or slowdown of distribution.

== Other propaganda channels ==
The main form of propaganda was word of mouth - P officers talking with junior officers, who in turn communicated ideas to the private soldiers. This depended on individual capabilities, the officers’ charisma and the willingness of the soldiers to listen, so there is no record of its effectiveness. We only know the contents of the "talking points" that the P officers used, and from these we can be sure that they were intended to encourage the ordinary soldiers to be part of a conversation. In 1918 the High Command decided that postcards should carry propaganda images as well as traditional ones. Each soldier sent an average of three postcards and three letters per week, so postcards allowed the High Command to propagandise both the conscript and his family. At the same time, other forms of visual propaganda were established, such as cinema projections and the distribution of photographs, often reproduced in illustrative magazines or postcards. In this case, the role of the P Service was to distribute the material in the Soldiers' Houses or set up mobile cinemas, but the production of these materials was organised by the High Command itself. Officers, who were the main audience for P Service initiatives, continued to receive patriotic lectures by prominent civilians, parliamentarians, professors and senior military officials. During these meetings officers were given books, brochures, and the Moral Liaison notebook devised by Lombardo Radice, and they used these materials to spread their ideas with their subordinates. The P Service was aware that such lectures did not appeal to ordinary soldiers but only to officers. There are no studies of the use of theatre at the front. We only know that theatres set up for the troops had been operating regularly since the summer of 1917, and in 1918 the P Service of the 1st Army hired a company of puppeteers, who held two or three shows a day with a travelling theatre.

== The P Service for troops overseas ==
In July 1918, when the II Army Corps of General Alberico Albricci was transferred to the western front, there was a new need to establish a surveillance and propaganda unit for the troops in France. This differed somewhat in structure from the P Service in Italy. A propaganda office was established in the general inspectorate of auxiliary troops in France, with dedicated sections set up for each group command. Its main task was propaganda although the moral and material needs of the troops were also considered; however, there was no troop assistance service similar to that offered by the P Service in Italy, and there was no similar structure to that which existed in Italy between the central office, subsections and officers. In France, the officers did not have the decision-making autonomy typical of a P officer in Italy. Instead they relied completely on the instructions of their commander and were also not relieved of the usual duties of service.

As for the XVI Army Corps stationed in Albania, in April 1918 a propaganda office was established which, unlike the P Service in Italy, was not charged with surveillance of the troops (despite being required to "sense their needs"). Instead it was limited to propaganda only (Soldier's houses, refreshment points, soldier's newspapers, etc.). The officers in charge did not have full freedom of action, and only department commanders could direct officers to carry out propaganda duties and exempt them from normal service. A supervisory body was also established for the military contingent which was sent to Slovakia in December 1018, where it remained until June 1919. There is insufficient documentation to assess any possible P service functions in the Italian expeditionary forces in Macedonia, Palestine, Murmansk and Manchuria.

== The P-Service after the war ==
With the signing of the armistice of Villa Giusti November 3, 1918, it was no longer necessary for the P Service to foster the fighting spirit of the troops, but its work remained fundamental for the discipline of the army and the preparation of soldiers for demobilization. Activities at the existing Soldiers' Houses were intensified and new ones were opened. Classes for the illiterate were encouraged and new cooperative outlets were opened, to ensure that "the soldier returns home with a calm soul". In order to prepare the younger conscripts for civilian work, in March 1919 Badoglio launched a technical education program.

The work of assistance and propaganda through conversations also continued, with P officers continuing to report on the morale of the troops, while officers were assigned to carry out surveillance activities among the population. These officers were chosen from their knowledge of the local dialects, and paid particular attention to discharged soldiers. Trusted members of the clergy and military chaplains were also sent into the population to watch popular demonstrations and schools. All this was organized to spread the "spirit of Italianness", identifying and arresting enemy agents and deserters.

The exact date when the P Service was shut down is not known, but the factors that brought about its end included escalating costs and the liberal ideology of the government that could not tolerate the use of propaganda in a period of political normalization. Prime Minister Orlando declared himself in favor of suppressing organized propaganda outside the army. The final demobilization began on 25 July, and this date also heralded the end of all the army intelligence offices, and with them the P sections. From 31 July 1919 these became part of the information office of the General Staff Corps in Rome.

== See also ==
- Propaganda and censorship in Italy during the First World War
