= Tassoni =

Tassoni is an Italian surname. Notable people with the surname include:

- Alessandro Tassoni (1565–1635), Italian poet and writer
- Giulio Cesare Tassoni (1859–1942), Italian general

== See also ==
- Tassone
