= Propaganda in Italy =

Propaganda in Italy may refer to:

- Propaganda and censorship in Italy during the First World War
- Propaganda in Fascist Italy
