= Luigi Druetti =

Italian general

Italian Governor of Tripolitana
- In office 1 November 1914 – 5 February 1915
- Preceded by: Giorgio Cigliana
- Succeeded by: Giulio Cesare Tassoni

Personal details
- Born: 1853
- Died: 1919 (aged 65–66)

Luigi Druetti (1853–1919) was an Italian general. He was the governor of Tripolitania from November 1914 to February 1915.

At the beginning of World War I, he commanded the 5th division of corpus III.
