= List of colonial governors of Italian Tripolitania =

Governor of Italian Tripolitania
- Governatore della Tripolitania Italiana
- Coat of arms of Italian Tripolitania

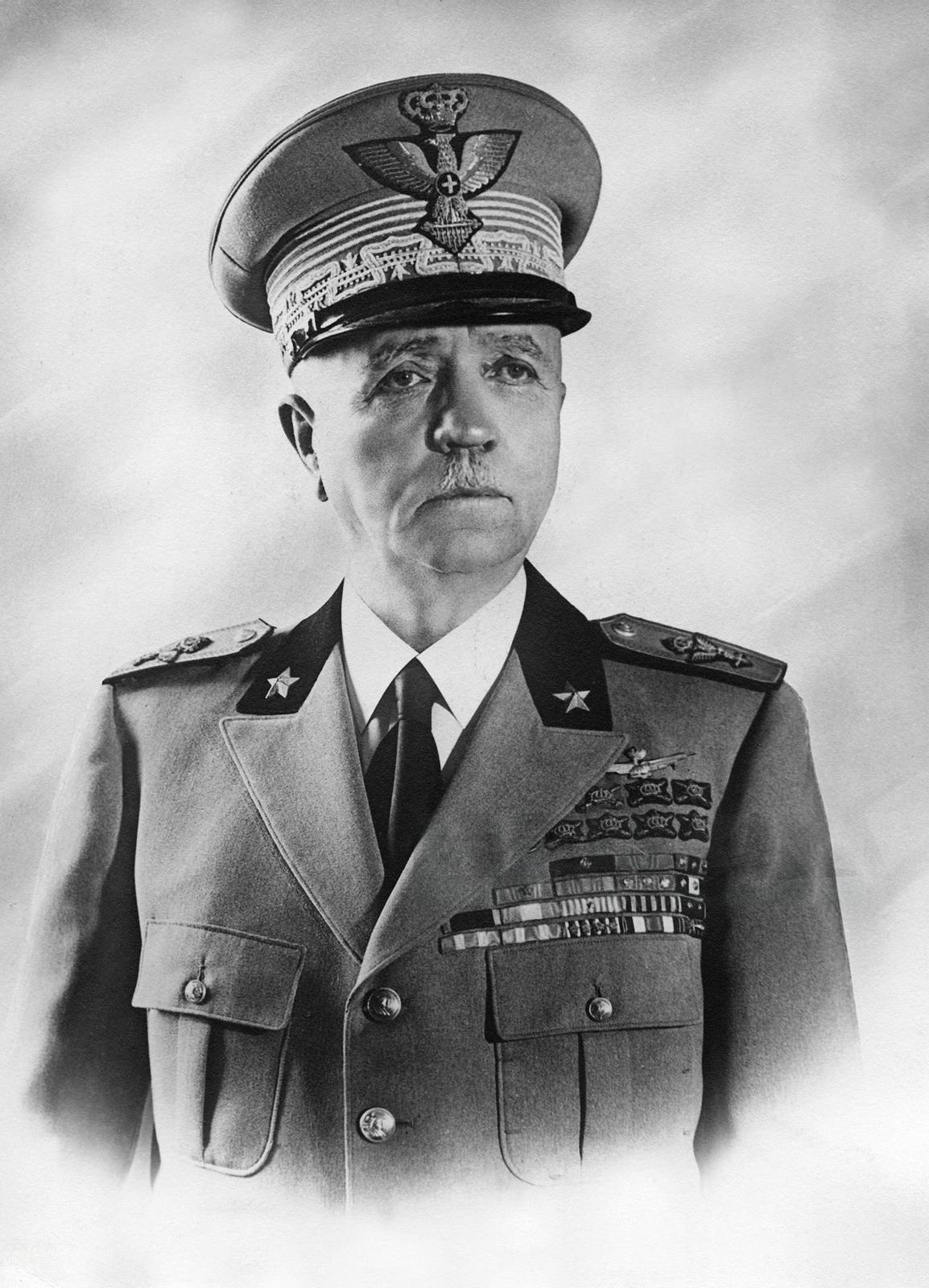
- Longest serving Pietro Badoglio; 18 December 1928 – 31 December 1933
- Reports to: King of Italy
- Formation: 5 October 1911
- First holder: Raffaele Borea Ricci d'Olmo
- Final holder: Pietro Badoglio
- Abolished: 31 December 1933
- Succession: Governor-General of Italian Libya

Map of traditional provinces of Libya, with Tripolitania marked in green.

This article lists the colonial governors of Italian Tripolitania from 1911 to 1934. They administered the territory on behalf of the Kingdom of Italy.

== List ==
Complete list of colonial governors of Italian Tripolitania:

No.	Portrait	Name (Birth–Death)	Term of office		
No.	Portrait	Name (Birth–Death)	Took office	Left office	Time in office
Italian Suzerainty
1	Raffaele Borea Ricci d'Olmo	Vice admiral Raffaele Borea Ricci d'Olmo (1857–1942)	5 October 1911	13 October 1911	8 days
2	Carlo Caneva	Major general Carlo Caneva (1845–1922)	13 October 1911	5 November 1911	23 days
Italian Tripolitania Protectorate
2	Carlo Caneva	Major general Carlo Caneva (1845–1922)	5 November 1911	2 September 1912	302 days
3	Ottavio Ragni	Major general Ottavio Ragni (1852–1919)	2 September 1912	2 June 1913	273 days
4	Vincenzo Garioni	Lieutenant general Vincenzo Garioni (1856–1929)	2 June 1913	1 October 1914	1 year, 121 days
5	Giorgio Cigliana	Divisional general Giorgio Cigliana (1857–1919)	2 October 1914	16 November 1914	45 days
6	Luigi Druetti	Lieutenant general Luigi Druetti (1853–1919)	16 November 1914	5 February 1915	81 days
7	Giulio Cesare Tassoni	Lieutenant general Giulio Cesare Tassoni (1859–1942)	5 February 1915	15 July 1915	160 days
8	Giovanni Ameglio	Lieutenant general Giovanni Ameglio (1854–1921)	15 July 1915	8 August 1918	3 years, 24 days
(4)	Vincenzo Garioni	Lieutenant general Vincenzo Garioni (1856–1929)	8 August 1918	8 August 1919	1 year
9	Vittorio Menzinger	Vittorio Menzinger (1861–1925) (Note: The first civilian Governor of Tripolitania)	16 August 1919	6 July 1920	325 days
–	Ugo Niccoli	Ugo Niccoli (1868–?); Acting	6 July 1920	31 July 1920	25 days
10	Luigi Mercatelli	Luigi Mercatelli (1853–1922)	1 August 1920	16 July 1921	349 days
–	Eduardo Baccari	Eduardo Baccari (1871–1952); Acting	16 July 1921	24 August 1921	39 days
11	Giuseppe Volpi	Giuseppe Volpi (1877–1947)	24 August 1921	12 November 1922	1 year, 80 days
Italian Tripolitania Colony
11	Giuseppe Volpi	Giuseppe Volpi (1877–1947)	12 November 1922	3 July 1925	2 years, 233 days
12	Emilio De Bono	Marshal; Emilio De Bono (1866–1944)	3 July 1925	18 December 1928	3 years, 168 days
12	Pietro Badoglio	Marshal; Pietro Badoglio (1871–1956) (Note: Unique Governor of Tripolitania and Cyrenaica after 21 January 1929)	18 December 1928	31 December 1933	5 years, 13 days

For continuation after unification, see: List of governors-general of Italian Libya

== See also ==
- Ottoman Tripolitania
  - Pasha of Tripoli
- Italian Libya
  - List of governors-general of Italian Libya
- Italian Cyrenaica
  - List of colonial governors of Italian Cyrenaica
- Italian Tripolitania
