= Tassone =

Tassone is an Italian surname. Notable people with the surname include:

- Mario Tassone (born 1943), Italian politician and lawyer
- Paul Tassone (born 1969), Australian actor

== See also ==
- Tassoni
