= Carlo Caneva =

Italian general (1845–1922)

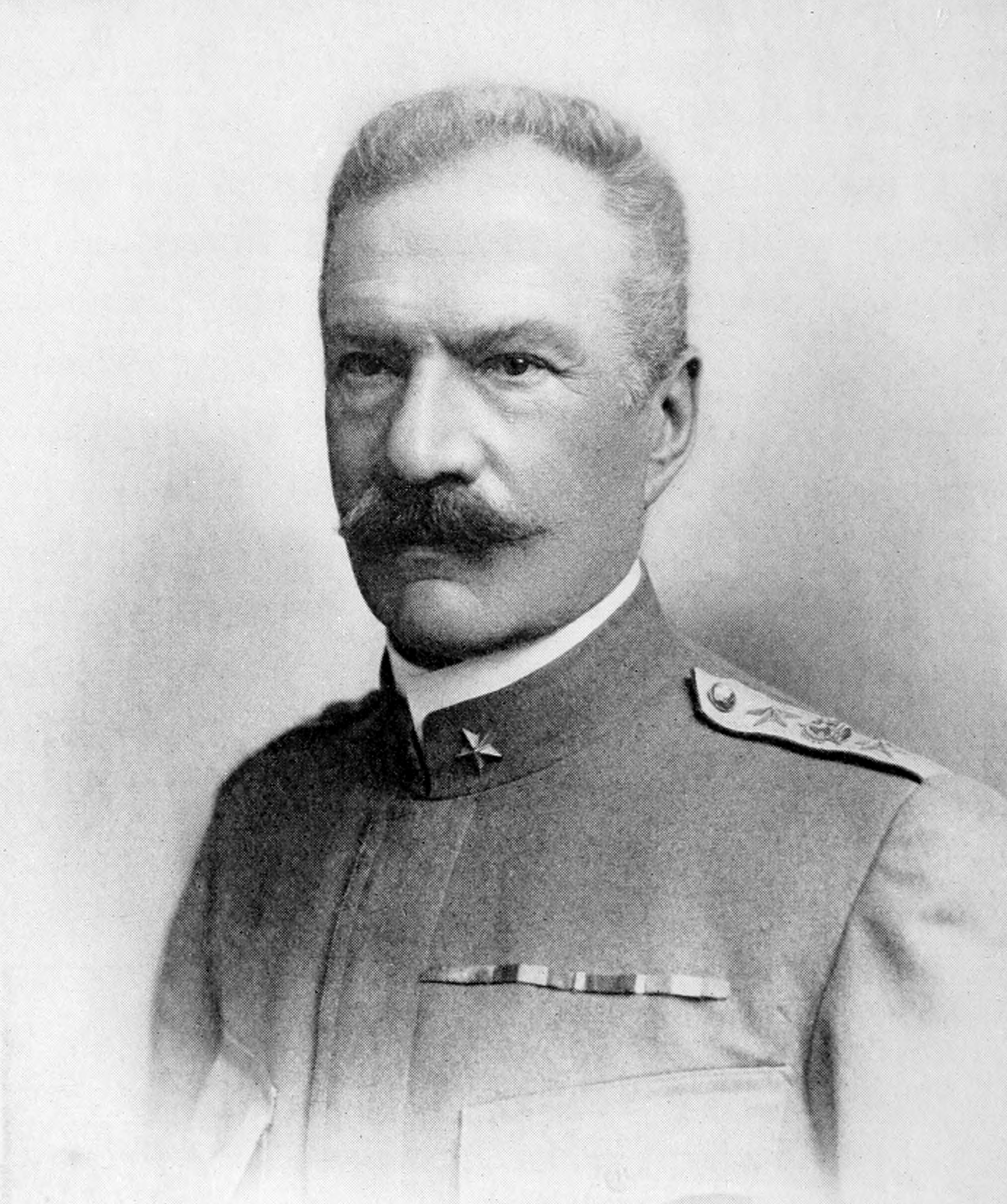
- Carlo Caneva
- Born: 22 April 1845; Udine, then in the Kingdom of Lombardy–Venetia
- Died: 25 September 1922 (aged 77); Rome
- Military career
- Allegiance: Austria-Hungary; Kingdom of Italy
- Branch: Royal Italian Army
- Rank: General

Carlo Caneva (22 April 1845, Udine – 25 September 1922, Rome) was an Italian general, known for having led the conquest of Libya in the Italo-Turkish War.

== Life ==
Since his birthplace was then in the Kingdom of Lombardy–Venetia within the Austrian Empire, he began his military career in the Austro-Hungarian Army as an artillery lieutenant under Benedek. After the Austro-Prussian War and the Austrian defeat at Sadowa, he decided to move to the Italian army in 1867. Completing his studies at the Scuola di Guerra, he was attached to Italy's general staff and in 1896 left for Eritrea as an infantry colonel to fight against Ethiopia and the Dervishes. In those campaigns he rose to major general.

In 1911, after commanding divisions and then an army corps, he was selected to lead Italy's Libyan campaign against the Ottoman Empire and Libyan resistance forces under Omar Mukhtar, which ended in 1912. Sidney Sonnino described Caneva at the time of the Libyan campaign as "a man who has had stomach troubles for eight years to the present". Luigi Barzini was also critical, stating the "On my word of honour, I did not know if he was worth the table (as they say) for the most complete example of stupidity". Giovanni Giolitti, an unobjective source, remarked that Caneva lacked initiative and did not understand the implications of his conduct for international politics. He was harshly criticised for having ignored (supposedly out of narrow-mindedness) the local Arab leaders during the first week of the Italian landings; and for his slow conventional conduct, lacking initiative and passive in the military operations that followed. The foreign military attaches watching the conflict were amazed to note that he did not use cavalry in a theatre admirably well-suited to it and how he did not consider requesting reinforcements for his already-small force.

He was recalled in 1912 and promoted to the rank of Generale d'Esercito (General); he retired from active service for old age in 1914, but in 1917 he was appointed to preside the enquiry about the disastrous defeat suffered at Caporetto.

Preceded by Raffaele Borea Ricci D'Olmo	Governor of Tripolitana; 1911-1912	Succeeded by Ottavio Ragni
