= Raffaele Borea Ricci d'Olmo =

Italian naval officer

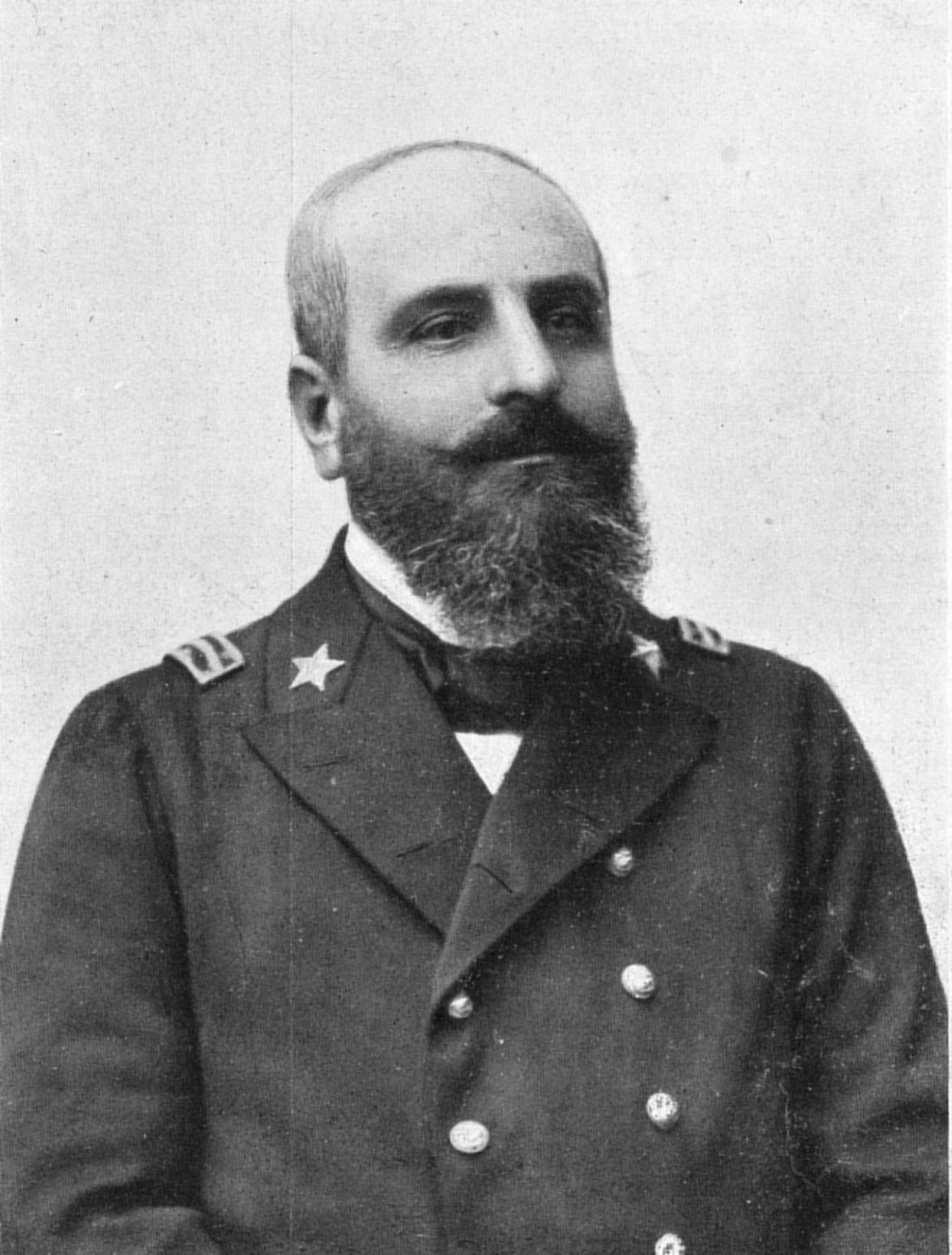

Italian Governor of Tripolitana
- In office 5 – 11 October 1911
- Preceded by: Ottoman Empire
- Succeeded by: Carlo Caneva

Personal details
- Born: 20 December 1857 Albenga
- Died: 1942–43

Raffaele Borea Ricci d'Olmo was an Italian naval officer with the rank of vice admiral (viceammiraglio). He was the first Italian governor of Tripolitania, then still counter admiral (contrammiraglio), although he de facto ruled only the city of Tripoli, during the first days of the Italian invasion of the colony from October 5 to 13, 1911. When Tripoli was attacked later in October, Borea Ricci declared martial law.
