= Giorgio Cigliana =

Italian general

Italian Governor of Tripolitana
- In office 2 – 30 October 1914
- Preceded by: Vincenzo Garioni
- Succeeded by: Luigi Druetti

Personal details
- Born: 13 March 1857 Castellamonte
- Died: October 8, 1919 (aged 62) Florence

Giorgio Cigilana (1857-1919) was an Italian general. He had been the governor of Tripolitania for a short time in 1914.

At the beginning of World War I he commanded the 11th corps of the 3rd Italian army.

== Biography ==
Cigilana was born in Castellamonte (Turin Province) on March 13, 1857, and began matriculation at the Modena Military Academy in 1872, commissioned as a second lieutenant in 1875. He was then assigned to the 4th Bersaglieri Regiment. In 1882, after attending the War School, he was promoted to captain and assigned to the 1st Bersaglieri Regiment, transferred first to Chieti and then to Rome for temporary duty, and then to the General Staff Corps. Promoted to major in 1890, he was assigned to the 72nd Infantry Regiment and quickly moved through the ranks. On June 7, 1906 he was appointed a Brigadier General, and assumed command of the "Siena" Infantry Brigade stationed in Cuneo and, then, of the 1st Alpine Brigade.

In 1910 he was appointed Inspector of the Alpine troops in Rome, retaining the post even after his promotion, on June 11, 1911, to division general. In 1913 he was appointed Commander of the Tripolitan troops in Libya and then assuming, in October 1914, the post of Governor of the Colony replacing General Vincenzo Garioni. Before returning to Italy to assume his new position as general of the XI Army Corps in Bari, he wrote and sent a detailed report to the Foreign Office explaining the political and military dangers the Colony was undergoing. The Office merely took note of the situation described but did not share the forecasts. A few months later the military situation in Libya deteriorated. The rebels completely destroyed some internal garrisons, so that the Italian occupation was reduced to the coastal areas alone.

With the entry into the war of Italy, on May 24, 1915 he commanded the XI Army Corps operating under the 3rd Army of Prince Emanuele Filiberto, Duke of Aosta. The Corps was assigned to the Isonzo border with Austria-Hungary and participated in attacking the enemy defenses on the Karst. The XI Army Corps, initially consisting of the 21st and 22nd Divisions was gradually strengthened so that during the 1916 offensives it grew to 5 Divisions.

At the head of his unit, Cigliana took part in the first ten Battles of the Isonzo, always deployed to the left of the 3rd Army, and initially versus against the formidable defenses of Mount San Michele, and then operating in the rugged and desolate sector of the Karst, beyond the Vallone (beyond Gorizia). On June 29, 1916 (at Monte San Michele)) the Austrians attacked using asphyxiating gases and in less than two hours the Italians had 2,700 dead and 4,000 incapacitated. Bringing himself up to the front line, he encouraged the survivors and helped succeed in repelling the enemy attack. In August of the same year (Sixth Battle of the Isonzo), the XI Corps succeeded in taking Monte San Michele, and to secure the quotas (high grounds) to the east of the Vallone. For this success General Cigliana was awarded as Commander of the Military Order of Savoy (Commendatore dell'Ordine Militare di Savoia).

In the seventh, eighth and ninth battle of the Isonzo, fought in the second half of 1916, the troops of the XI Corps reached beyond Veliki Kriback and Dosso Faiti. After the tenth battle of the Isonzo (May 1917) he left the command of the XI Army Corps. Under the command of General Cigliana, this unit was cited three times in the Supreme Command's war bulletins, while other actions of this army were mentioned in five other war bulletins. On August 23, 1917 he assumed command of the Naples Corps, and after the war, on January 5, 1919 of the Florence Corps. It was in Florence that he died suddenly on October 8 of the same year. The commander of the 3rd Army, the Duke of Aosta wrote to his widow: With anguished heart I express to you and your family the most sincere expression of condolences for the painful loss of General Cigliana, my devoted collaborator and dear friend. The flags of the Third Army bend reverently before the tomb of the ancient Commander of the XI Corps which comes from the bloody cliffs of San Michele and the battered Faiti the sweet call of our brothers in arms today joined in immortality and glory. He is interred in the Commemorative Cemetery of Porte Sante in San Miniato, located above Piazzale Michelangelo.

== See also ==
- Italo-Turkish War
