= Ottavio Ragni =

Kingdom of Italy politician

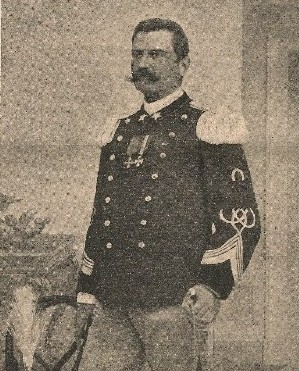

Italian Governor of Tripolitana
- In office 2 September 1912 – 2 June 1913
- Preceded by: Carlo Caneva
- Succeeded by: Vincenzo Garioni

Personal details
- Born: 21 April 1852 Romagnano Sesia
- Died: 21 May 1919 (aged 67) Romagnano Sesia

Ottavio Ragni was an Italian general. He had been the governor of Tripolitania between (1912–1913).

At the battle of Adwa, during the Italian invasion of Abyssinia, he led the 3rd Infantry Regiment Africa.

At the beginning of World War I he commanded the 1st corps of the 4th Italian army.
