= Battle of Vittorio Veneto =

Battle during World War I (October–November 1918)

- Part of the Italian Front of World War I
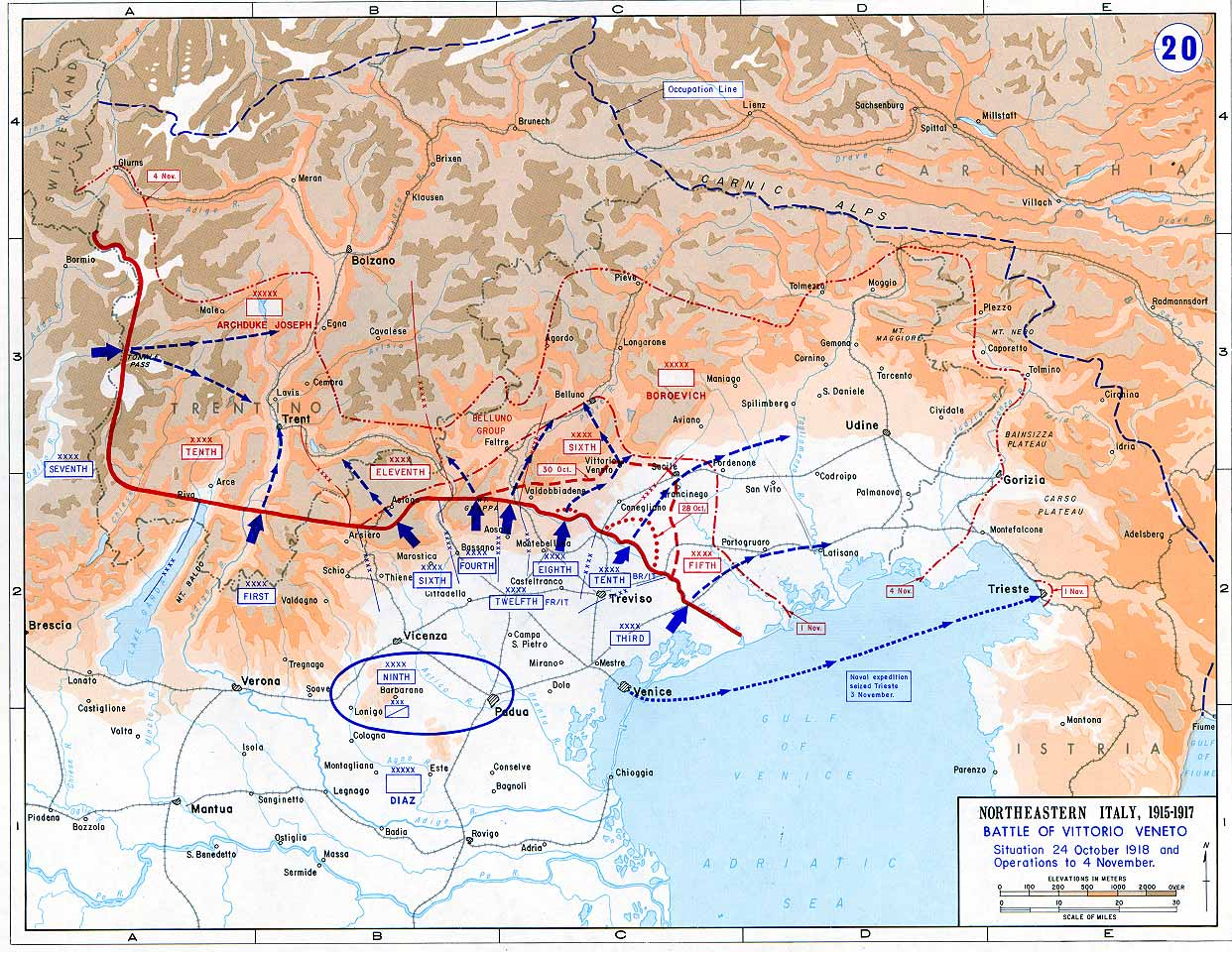
- Map of the battle
Date	24 October – 4 November 1918
Location	Vittorio, Kingdom of Italy 45°57′21″N 12°20′49″E
Result	Italian victory; Collapse of the Austro-Hungarian Empire

Belligerents
Italy; United Kingdom; France; United States	Austria-Hungary

Commanders and leaders
Armando Diaz	Svetozar Boroević; AD. Joseph August; Alexander von Krobatin

Strength
56 divisions; (Kingdom of Italy) 51 divisions; (United Kingdom of Great Britain and Ireland) 3 divisions; (French Third Republic) 2 divisions; (United States) 1 regiment; 900 aircraft; 7,700 artillery pieces	56 divisions - 50 infantry, 6 cavalry, 6,145 artillery pieces

Casualties and losses
40,917; 38,000; 7,000 killed; 23,000 wounded; 8,000 missing and captured; 2,139; 778; 8	528,000; 30,000 killed; 50,000 wounded; 448,000 captured; 5,000+ artillery pieces captured

The Battle of Vittorio Veneto was fought from 24 October to 4 November 1918 near Vittorio Veneto on the Italian Front during World War I. After having defeated Austro-Hungarian troops during the Second Battle of the Piave River and recognizing the dire internal situation of Austria-Hungary caused by the course of the war and the blockade of the Adriatic at sea, the Royal Italian Army launched a major offensive: the Italian victory marked the end of the war on the Italian Front and the dissolution of the Austro-Hungarian Empire, contributing to the end of the First World War just one week later. The battle led to the capture of over 5,000 artillery pieces and 448,000 Austro-Hungarian troops, including Germans, Hungarians, Czechs, Slovaks, Slovenes, Croatians, Poles, Romanians, Ukrainians, and also a small number of Austro-Hungarian Italians.

== Name ==
When the battle was fought in November 1918, the nearby city was called simply Vittorio, named in 1866 for Vittorio Emanuele II, monarch from 1861 of the newly created Kingdom of Italy. The engagement, the last major battle in the war (1915–1918) between Italy and Austria-Hungary, was generally referred to as the Battle of Vittorio Veneto, i.e. 'Vittorio in the Veneto region'. The city's name was officially changed to Vittorio Veneto in July 1923, about nine months after Benito Mussolini and his National Fascist Party had ascended to power.

== Background ==
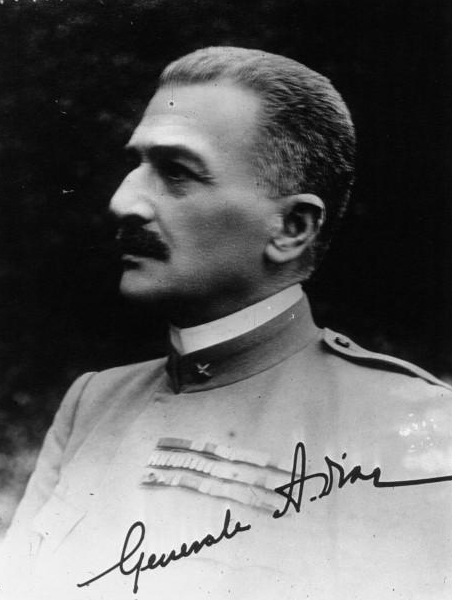
Armando Diaz

During the Battle of Caporetto, from 24 October to 9 November 1917, the Italian Army suffered over 300,000 casualties (dead, injured and captured) and was forced to withdraw, causing the replacement of the Italian Supreme Commander Luigi Cadorna with General Armando Diaz. Diaz reorganized the troops, blocked the enemy advance by implementing defense in depth and mobile reserves, and stabilized the front line around the Piave River.

In June 1918, a large Austro-Hungarian offensive, aimed at breaking the Piave River defensive line and delivering a decisive blow to the Italian Army, was launched. The Austro-Hungarian Army tried on one side to force the Tonale Pass and enter Lombardy, and on the other side to make two converging thrusts into central Venetia, the first one southeastward from the Trentino, and the second one southwestward across the lower Piave. The whole offensive, which became known as the Battle of the Piave River ended in a heavy defeat for the imperial army, with the Austro-Hungarians losing 11,643 killed, 80,852 wounded and 25,547 captured. On 1 November, the new Hungarian government of Count Mihály Károlyi decided to recall all of the troops who were conscripted from the territory of Kingdom of Hungary, which was a major blow for the Habsburgs' armies.

After the Battle of the Piave, General Armando Diaz abstained from offensive action until Italy would be ready to strike with success assured. In the offensive he planned, three of the five armies lining the front from the Monte Grappa sector to the Adriatic end of the Piave were to drive across the river toward Vittorio Veneto, so as to cut communications between the two Austrian armies opposing them.

Allied forces totaled 57 infantry divisions, including 52 Italian, three British (23rd, 7th and 48th), two French (23rd and 24th), and the 332nd US Infantry Regiment, along with supporting arms. The Austro-Hungarian army had 46 infantry divisions and six cavalry divisions, but both sides were ravaged by influenza and malaria and the Austrians only had 6,030 guns to Allied forces' 7,700.

The Italian armies in the mountains were merely to hold the front line and follow up the enemy when it retreated. The task of opening the attack and taking on the strongest positions fell to the Fourth Army (Lieutenant-General Gaetano Giardino) on the Grappa. The Twelfth Army, consisting of one French and three Italian divisions, was commanded by the English-speaking Lieutenant-General Enrico Caviglia and he had under his command the Tenth Army (Lieutenant-General Lord Cavan) to protect his right flank. Lord Cavan's army consisted of two British and two Italian divisions, and they too were expected to cross the Piave by breaking the Austrian defenses at Papadopoli Island. The Third Army was simply to hold the lower Piave and cross the river when enemy resistance was broken. The Ninth Army, which contained two Italian divisions as well as the 6th Czechoslovak Division (consisting of former POWs captured by the Italians), and the 332nd US Infantry Regiment, was held in reserve. The Allies had 600 aircraft (93 Anglo-French, including four RAF squadrons) to gain complete air superiority in the final offensive.

== Order of battle ==
The Allies:(Armando Diaz)

- 3rd Italian Army (Duke of Aosta)
  - 2 Army Corps
  - 2 assault units
  - 3 cavalry regiments
- 10th British-Italian Army (Earl of Cavan)
  - XI Corps (Italy) of Lt. General Giuseppe Paolini
  - 14th British Corps of General James Melville Babington.
  - 332nd Infantry Regiment (United States) of Col. William Wallace
- 8th Italian Army (Enrico Caviglia)
  - 4 Army corps
  - The assault corps of General Francesco Saverio Grazioli.
- 12th Franco-Italian Army (Jean César Graziani)
  - 1 Italian Army corps
  - 12th French Army Corps.
- 4th Italian Army (Gaetano Giardino)
  - 3 army corps
  - 4 assault groups
  - 1 regiment of cavalry.
- 6th Italian Army (Luca Montuori)
  - 3 Army corps
  - British 48th Division
- 7th Italian Army (Giulio Cesare Tassoni)
  - 2 Army corps
- 1st Italian Army (Guglielmo Pecori Giraldi)
  - 3 Army corps

In reserve:

- 9th Italian Army (Paolo Morrone)
  - 2 Army corps
  - 1 cavalry corps
  - 6th Czechoslovak Division

Austria-Hungary

- Heeresgruppe Boroević (Svetozar Boroević)
  - 5th Army (Isonzo Armee) (Wenzel Freiherr von Wurm)
  - 6th Army (Alois Schönburg-Hartenstein)
  - Armeegruppe Belluno (Ferdinand Goglia)
- Heeresgruppe Erzherzog Joseph (or Heeresgruppe Tirol) (Archduke Joseph of Austria, from 26 October Alexander von Krobatin)
  - 11th Army (Viktor Graf von Scheuchenstuel)
  - 10th Army (Alexander von Krobatin)

== Prelude ==
As night fell on 23 October, leading elements of Lord Cavan's Tenth Army were to force a crossing at a point where there were a number of islands. Cavan had decided to seize the largest of these – the Grave di Papadopoli – in preparation for the full-scale assault on the far bank. The plan was for two battalions from the 22nd Brigade of the British 7th Division to occupy the northern half of Papadopoli, while the Italian 11th Corps took the southern half. The British troops detailed for the night attack were the 2/1 Honourable Artillery Company (an infantry battalion despite the title) and the 1/ Royal Welch Fusiliers. These troops were helpless to negotiate such a torrent as the Piave and relied upon boats propelled by the 18th Pontieri under the command of Captain Odini of the Italian engineers. On the misty night of the 23rd, the Italians rowed the British forces across with a calm assurance and skill which amazed many of those who were more frightened of drowning than of fighting the Austrians. For the sake of silence, the HAC used only their bayonets until the alarm was raised, and soon seized their half of the island. The Italian assault on the south of Papadopoli was driven off by heavy machine-gun fire. Nevertheless, the Austrians surrendered the island by the end of the night.

== Battle ==
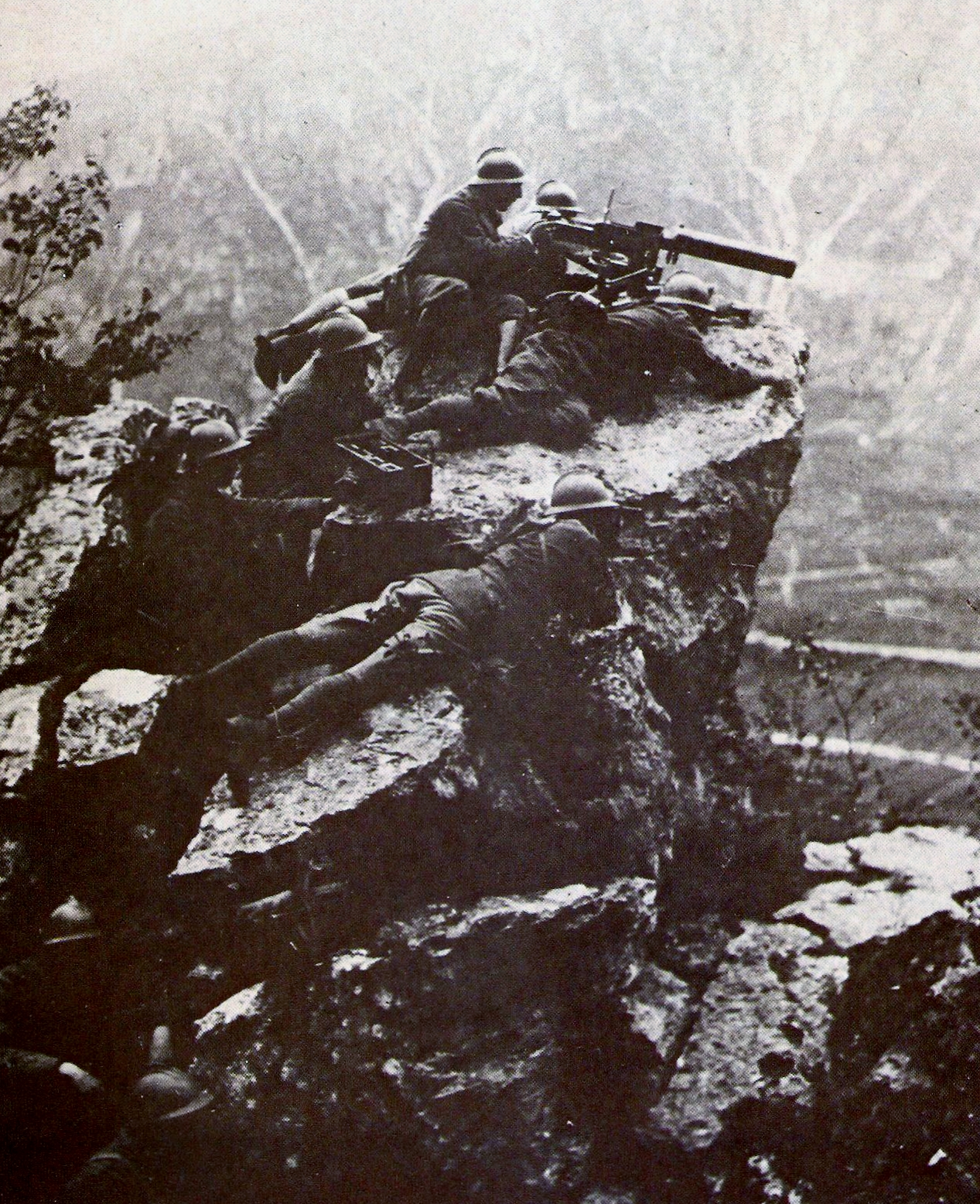
Italian machine gunners on Monte Grappa

In the early hours of 24 October, the anniversary of the beginning of the Battle of Caporetto, Comando Supremo launched the splintering attack on Monte Grappa designed to draw in the Austro-Hungarian reserves. At 03:00 the right wing of the Italian Fourth Army began a barrage to give time for its men to move into position. At 05:00 the rest of the artillery joined in. The infantry began to struggle up the steep slopes and secondary peaks which the Austrians had held. The flooding of the Piave prevented two of the three central armies from advancing simultaneously with the third; but the latter, under the command of Earl Cavan, after seizing Papadopoli Island farther downstream, won a foothold on the left bank of the river on 27 October. In the evening, the Allies had covered so much ground that they were over-extended and vulnerable to a counter-attack. The Italian Tenth Army maintained its ground and established a bridgehead 2.5 miles (4.0 km) deep and 5 miles (8.0 km) broad. The British captured 3,520 prisoners and 54 guns. Svetozar Boroević von Bojna, the Austro-Hungarian commander, ordered a counter-attack on the Italian bridgeheads on the same day, but his troops refused to obey orders, a problem confronting the Austrians from that time on, and the counter-attack failed. The first days of the battle involved heavy artillery dueling between the two sides, which were fairly evenly matched in firepower, with the Italians possessing 7,700 guns to the Austro-Hungarians' 6,000. From 24 to 31 October alone, the Italian artillery fired 2,446,000 shells.

On 28 October, a group of Czechs declared Bohemia's independence from Austria-Hungary. The next day, another group purporting to represent the eventual South Slavs proclaimed their independence, and on 31 October, the Hungarian Parliament proclaimed their withdrawal from the union, officially dissolving the Austro-Hungarian state. On 28 October, under these new political and military conditions, the Austro-Hungarian high command ordered a general retreat.

On 29 October, the Italian Eighth Army pushed on towards Vittorio Veneto, which its advance guard of lancers and Bersaglieri cyclists entered on the morning of the 30th. The Italian Third Army forced a crossing of the lower Piave, while raids in the mountains disclosed that the Austrians were withdrawing there. Reserves, including the 332nd US Infantry Regiment poured over the Piave behind the Italian Tenth Army.

Vittorio Veneto was seized the next day by the Italian Eighth Army, which was already pushing on to the Tagliamento river. Trieste was taken by an amphibious expedition on 3 November. The Italian Eighth Army troops which had managed to cross the Piave were only able to communicate with the west bank by using swimmers. The swimmers were furnished by one of the most elite assault units in Italian history – the Arditi Corps, the Caimani del Piave ("Caimans of the Piave"). Eighty-two had been recruited by Captain Remo Pontecorvo Bacci. These specialized troops were created after analyzing the mistakes the year before at Caporetto. Carrying a resolza knife and two hand grenades, they were trained to remain in the powerful currents of the icy Piave for up to 16 hours; 50 died in the river during the campaign, a casualty rate of over 60%. The Italian Twelfth Army, commanded by French General Jean Graziani, continued to advance, supported on the right by the Eighth Army.

At dawn on the 31st, the Italian Fourth Army resumed the offensive on Monte Grappa and this time was able to advance beyond the old Austrian positions towards Feltre. In the mountains and on the plain, the Allied armies pushed on until an armistice was arranged. Austria-Hungary lost about 30,000 killed and wounded and 300,000 prisoners (50,000 by 31 October; 100,000 by 1 November; 300,000 by 4 November). The Italians captured 448,000 Austrian-Hungarian soldiers (about one-third of the imperial-royal army), 24 of whom were generals, 5,600 cannons and mortars, and 4,000 machine guns.

During the 10 days' struggle, the Italians suffered 37,461 casualties (dead and wounded) – 24,507 of them on Monte Grappa. British casualties were 2,139, while the French lost 778 men.

The Armistice of Villa Giusti was signed on 3 November at 15:20, to become effective 24 hours later, at 15:00 on 4 November.

== Aftermath ==
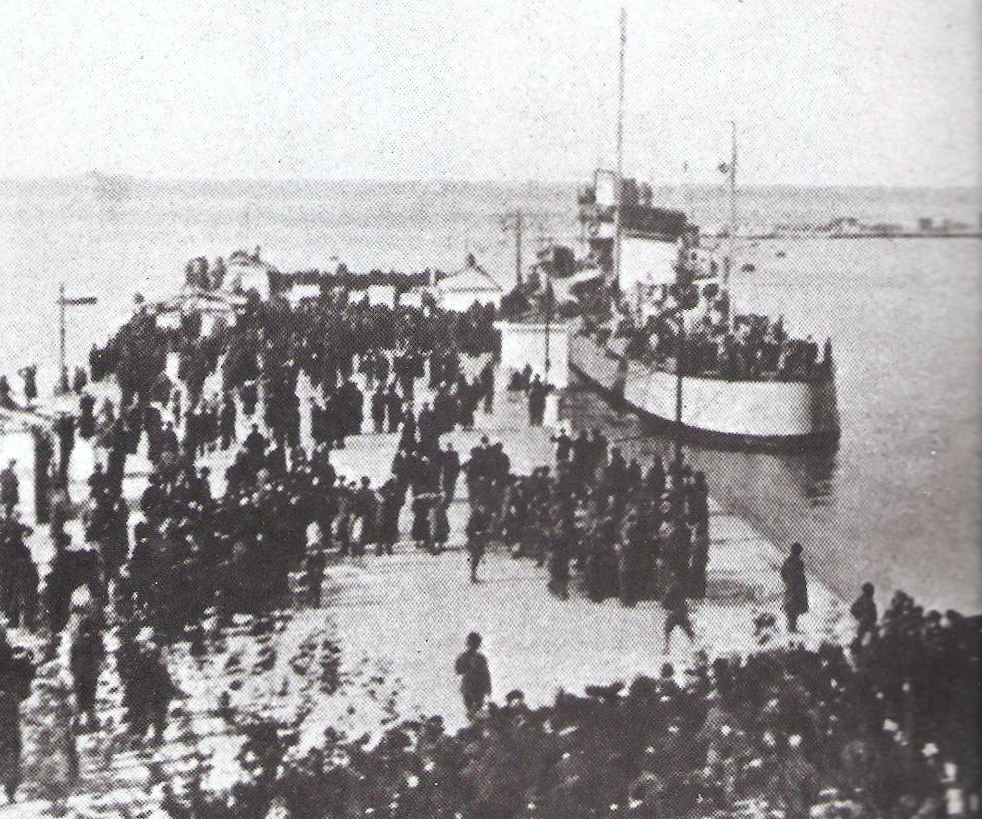
Italian troops landing in Trieste, 3 November 1918

On November 3, the Italian army entered Trento and the Italian navy landed in Trieste. The same day, Italy and Austria-Hungary signed an armistice at Villa Giusti (near Padua). The armistice contained a clause according to which it entered into force on November 4, the following day. Austrian General Viktor Weber Edler von Webenau had asked to cease combat immediately and to stop any further Italian advance. The proposal was sharply rejected by the Italian General Badoglio, who threatened to stop all negotiations and to continue the war. General Weber repeated the request. Even before the order to cease hostilities, the Imperial Army had already started to collapse, beginning a chaotic retreat. Italian troops continued their advance until 3 p.m. on 4 November. The occupation of all Tyrol, including Innsbruck, was completed by end of November.

Under the terms of the Austrian-Italian Armistice of Villa Giusti, Austria-Hungary's forces were required to evacuate not only all territory occupied since August 1914 but also South Tyrol, Tarvisio, the Isonzo Valley, Gorizia, Trieste, Istria, western Carniola, and Dalmatia. All German forces should be expelled from Austria-Hungary within 15 days or interned, and the Allies were to have free use of Austria-Hungary's internal communications. They were also obliged to allow the transit of the Entente armies, to reach Germany from the South.

In order to block this, German troops marched into Tyrol. Austrian institutions protested as they were obliged to do according to the terms of the armistice. Apart from the blowing up of a bridge south of Brixen to slow down Italian advances no combats ensued. The Germans retreated as soon as Italian troops arrived. Thus they left Franzensfeste on 9 November and Gossensass on 10 November. The discipline of the soldiers also suffered from the fact that the German socialist Kurt Eisner had declared Bavaria to become the People's State of Bavaria, on 8 November 1918. In early November Italian troops received orders to march towards Landeck and Innsbruck and by the end of November 1918, the Italian Army with 20,000–22,000 soldiers occupied North Tyrol.

The battle marked the end of the First World War on the Italian front and the collapse of the Austro-Hungarian empire as Hungary officially left the personal union with Austria and parts of the empire became independent, notably what later became Yugoslavia. The surrender of their primary ally was another major factor in the German Empire's decision that they could no longer continue the war. During the night of 29 to 30 October 1918 the Wilhelmshaven mutiny erupted; shortly afterwards the German Revolution of 1918–1919 started to spread from Kiel (Kiel mutiny). Less than a week after the Austro-Hungarians, the Germans requested an armistice. The Armistice was signed at 5:00 a.m. of 11 November 1918 and came into force at 11:00 a.m. CET).

== Assessment ==
German chief-of-staff Erich Ludendorff, a prominent World War I figure, stressed the importance of the battle, claiming that its outcome prompted the collapse of the Austro-Hungarian monarchy, "dragging Germany in its fall". In his memoir Ludendorff wrote: "The Austro-Hungarian Army had completely dissolved as a result of the fighting in Upper Italy between the 24th October and the 4th November. Hostile forces were moving on Innsbruck. G.H.Q. took comprehensive measures for the protection of the southern frontier of Bavaria. In the Balkan theatre we held the Danube. We stood alone in the world. At the beginning of November the Revolution, the work of the Independent Socialists, broke out, starting in the navy." German historian Ernst Nolte contended that Vittorio Veneto was "an encounter which had merely given the coup de grace to the abandoned army of an already crumbling state."

== Gallery ==
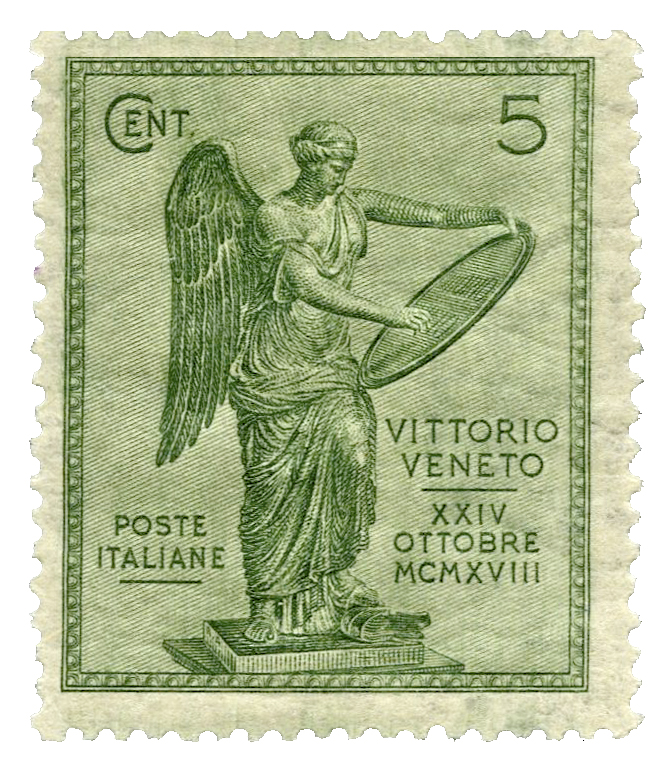
Postage stamp, Italy, 1921

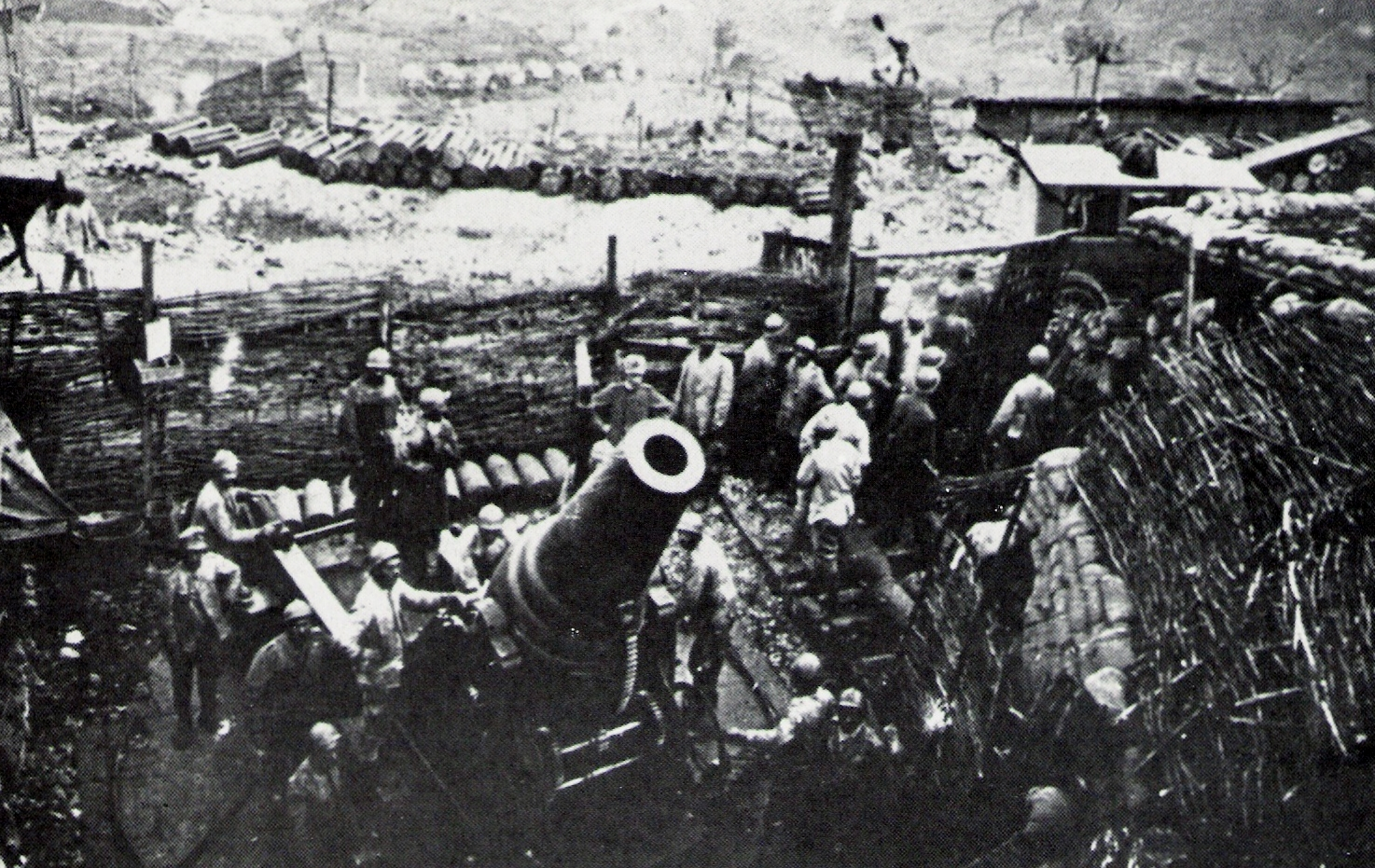
Italian heavy artillery 280mm howitzer

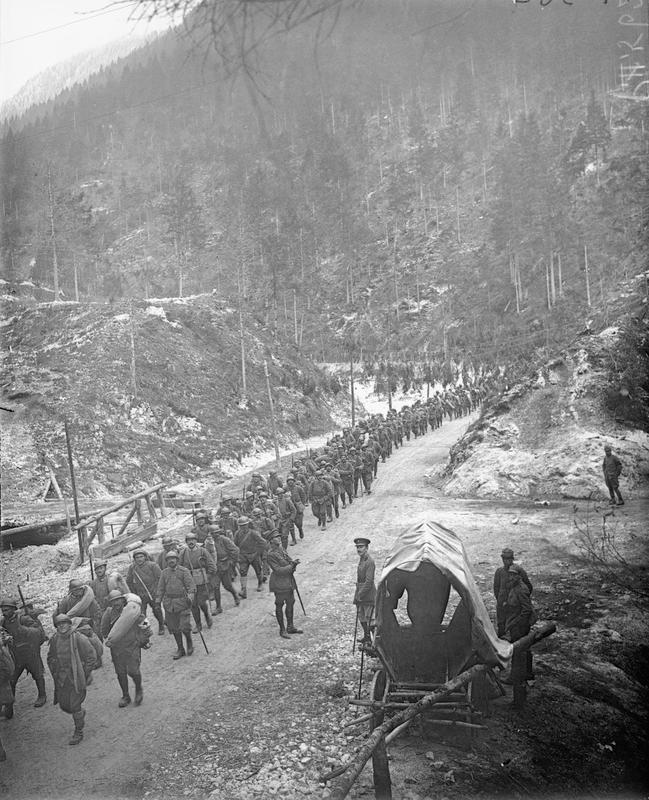
Italian troops in Val d'Assa

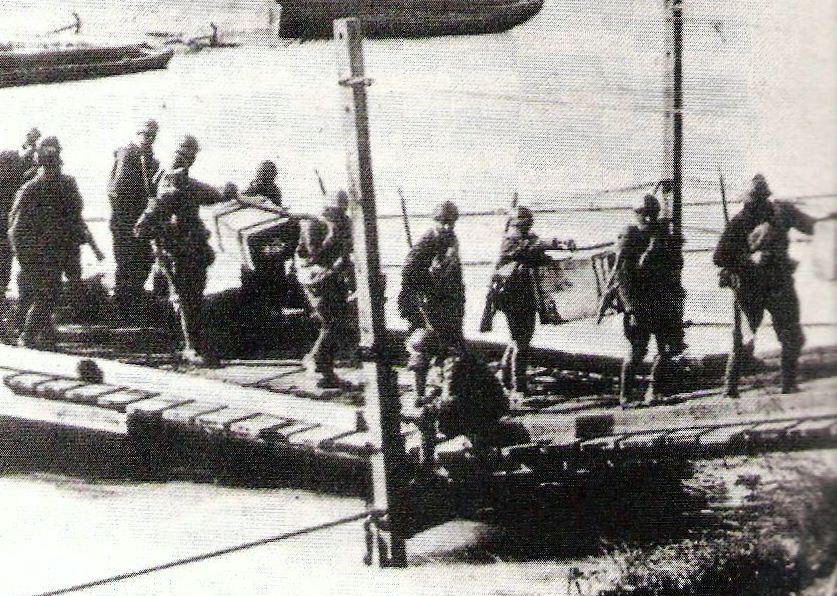
Italian troops cross the Piave

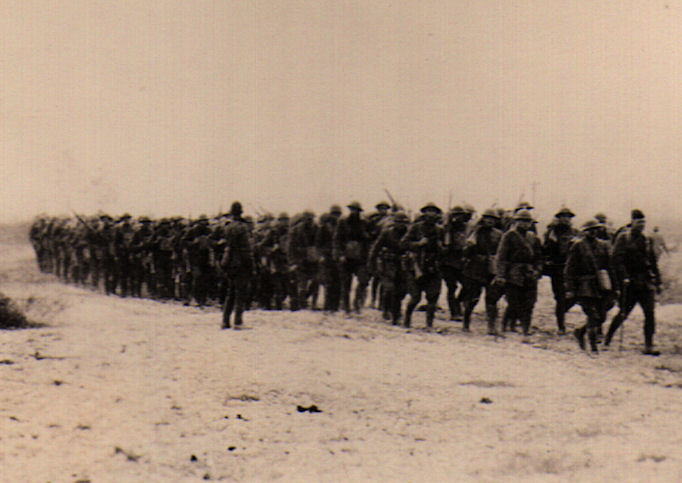
American troops of the 332nd Infantry Regiment advance through Grave di Papadopoli during the latter stages of the offensive on the afternoon of 31 October 1918

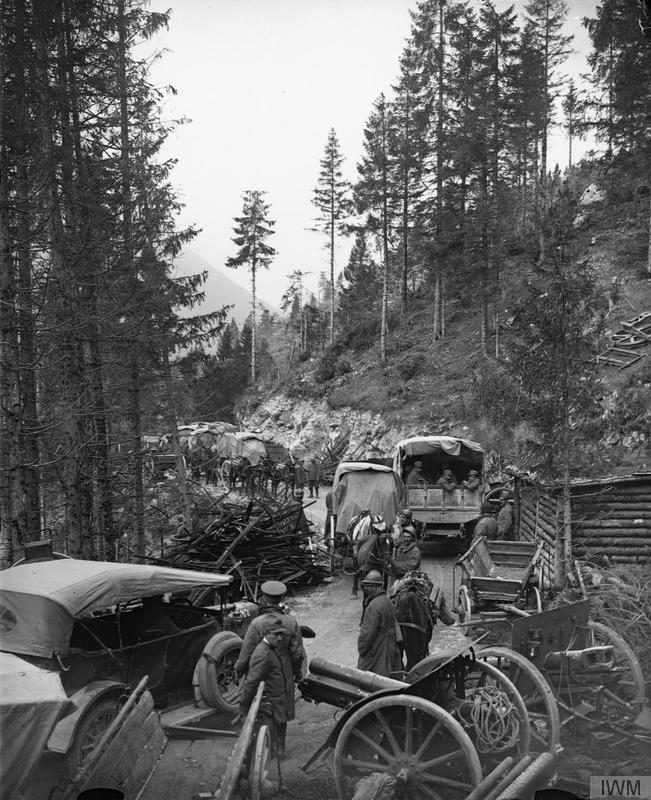
Italian and British troops passing abandoned Austro-Hungarian artillery on the Val d'Assa mountain road, 2 November 1918

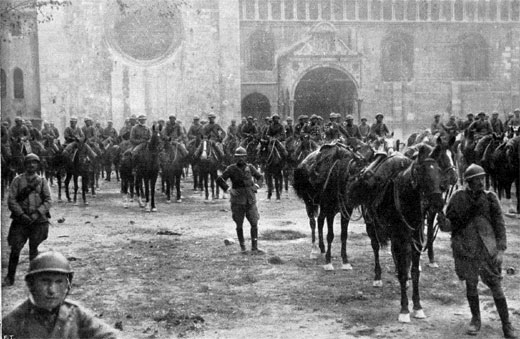
Italian cavalry reaches Trento on 3 November 1918

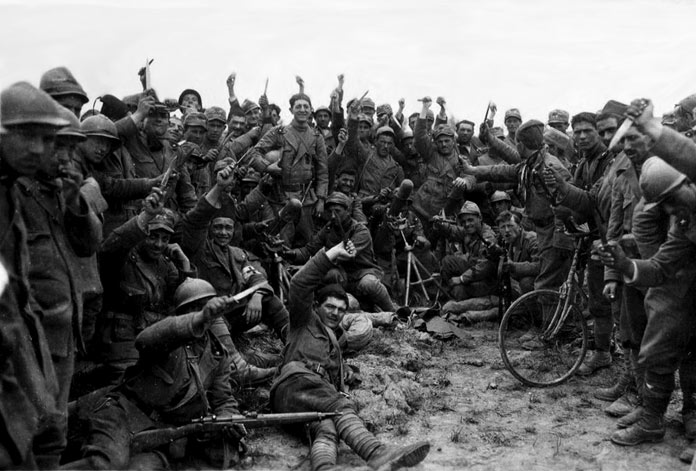
Members of the Arditi Corps wielding daggers, 1918

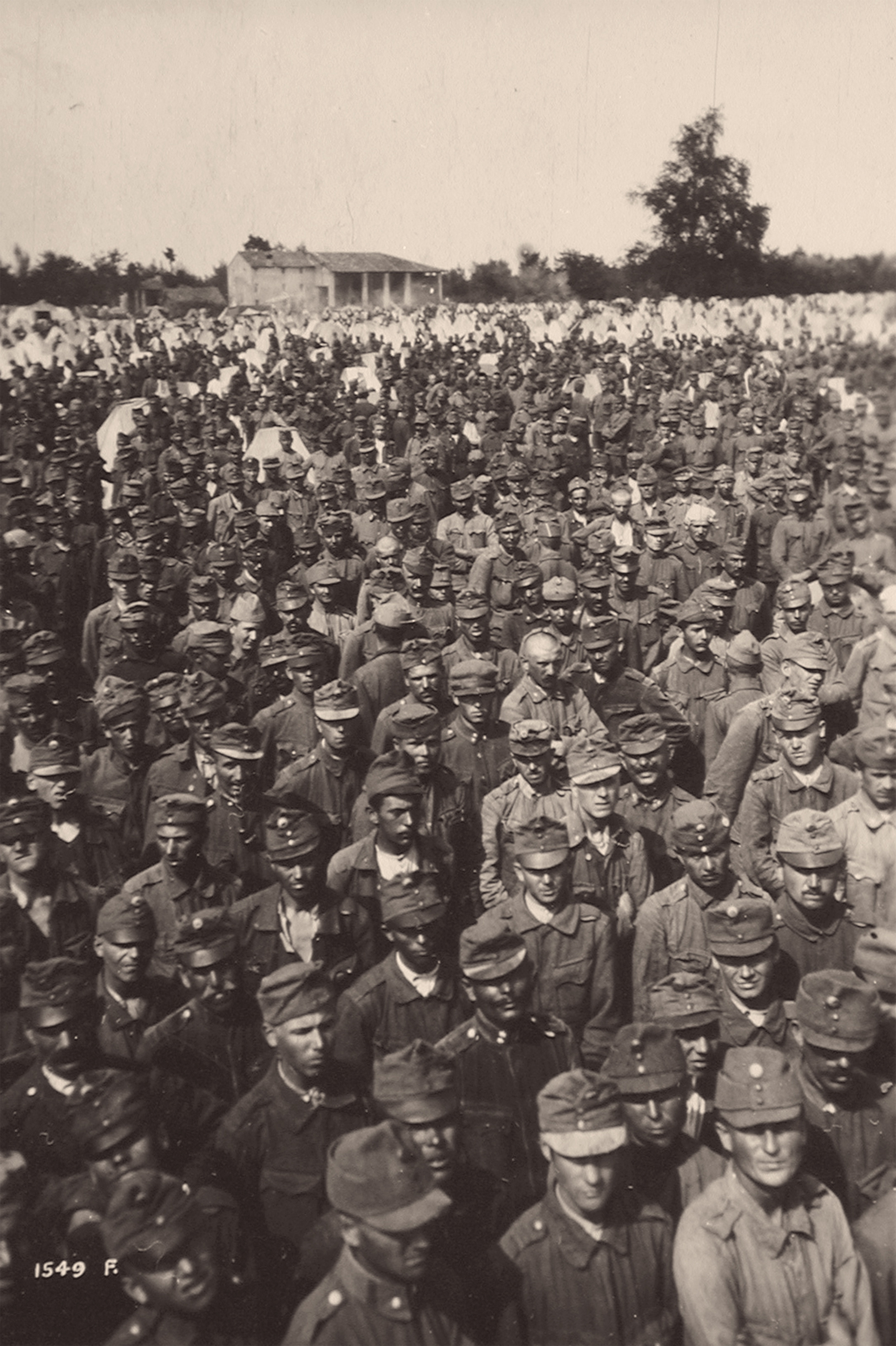
Austrian prisoners of war taken during the Battle of Vittorio Veneto

== See also ==
- Bollettino della Vittoria
- First Battle of the Piave River
- Second Battle of the Piave River

== Bibliography ==
- Clodfelter, M. (2017). Warfare and Armed Conflicts: A Statistical Encyclopedia of Casualty and Other Figures, 1492–2015 (4th ed.). Jefferson, North Carolina: McFarland. ISBN 978-0786474707.
- John Gooch (2014). The Italian Army and the First World War. Cambridge University Press.
- Wilks, John; Wilks, Eileen (1998). The British Army in Italy 1917–1918. Pen and Sword. ISBN 978-0850526080.
- Halpern, Paul (2004). The Battle of the Otranto Straits: Controlling the Gateway to the Adriatic in World War I. Bloomington, IN: Indiana University Press. ISBN 0-253-34379-8.
