= Jean César Graziani =

French army general

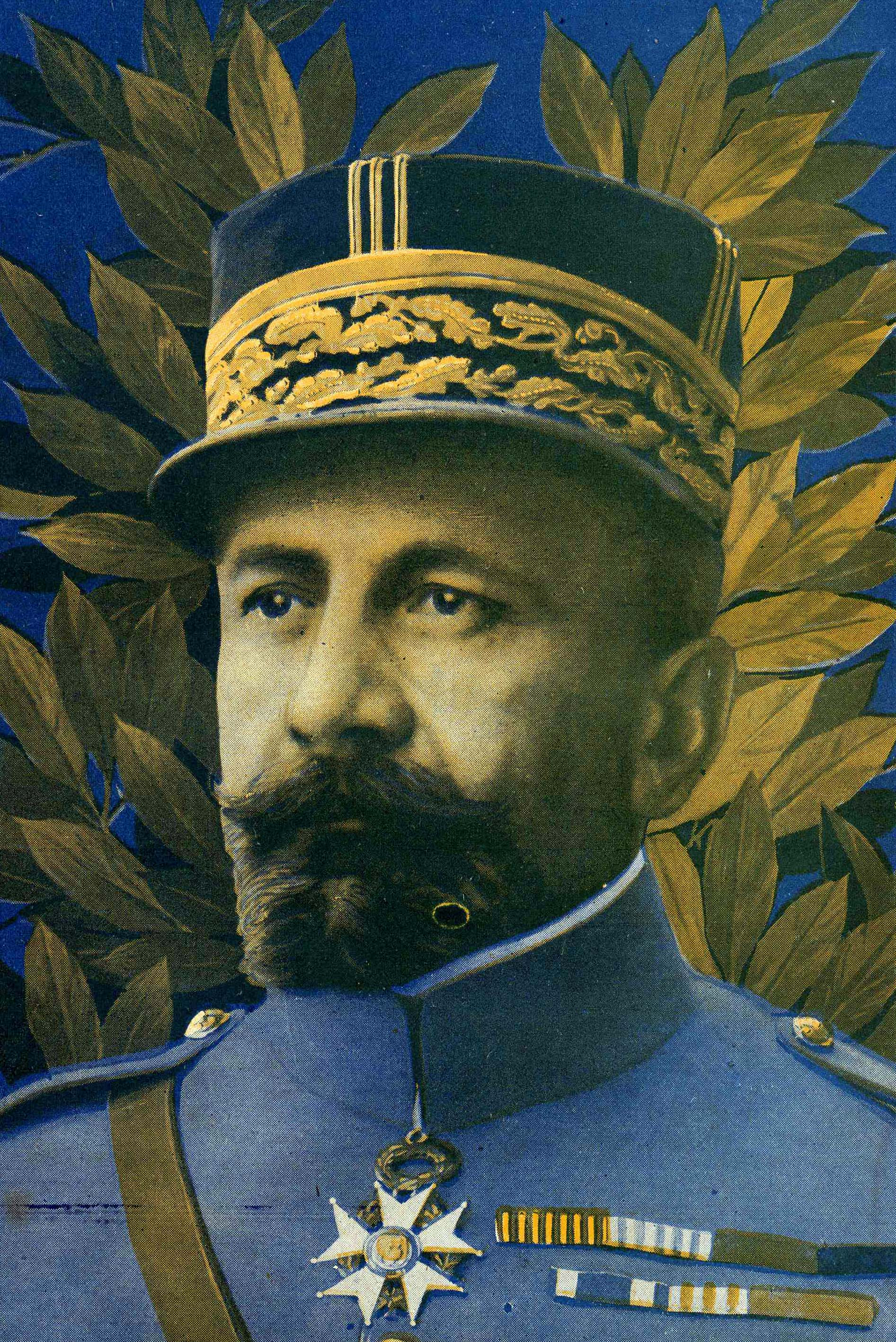
- Portrait
- Born: 15 November 1859; Bastia, Corsica
- Died: 8 February 1932 (aged 72); Paris
- Burial place: Père Lachaise Cemetery
- Military career
- Allegiance: France
- Branch: (French Third Republic) French Army (Kingdom of Italy) Royal Italian Army
- Rank: Major general
- Conflicts: World War I: Italian front

Jean César Graziani (French pronunciation: [ʒɑ̃ sezaʁ ɡʁazjani]; Bastia, Corsica, 15 November 1859 – Paris, 8 February 1932) was a Corsican French Army general who served in World War I.

== Early years ==
He started his studies at the Ecole Spéciale Militaire de Saint-Cyr in October 1878. He participated in the Algerian and Tunisian campaigns and by 1909 commanded the 96th Infantry Regiment.
In 1912 he became director of the Infantry at the Ministry of Defence. On 29 January 1913, by now a Brigadier General, he became head of the cabinet of the Minister of Defence.

== World War I ==
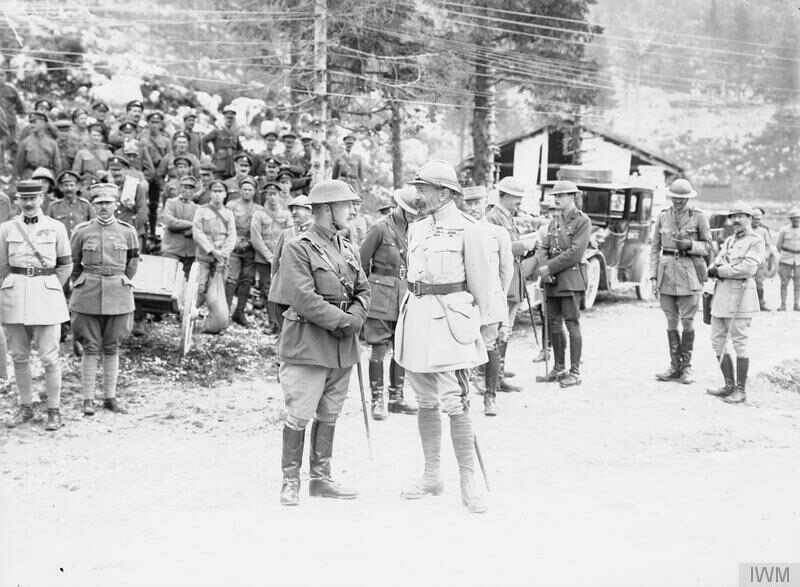
General Rudolph Lambart, 10th Earl of Cavan), the C-in-C of the British Army in Italy, and General Jean Graziani, the C-in-C of the French Army in Italy, chatting before the presentation of decorations to soldiers of both armies after the Battle of the Piave River. Granezza, 12 July 1918".

One month after the outbreak of World War I, he became vice chief of the État-major of the Army and on 31 July 1915 chief of the État-major of the Army.
In April 1917 he received field command of the 28th Division and in December 1917 of the 17th Army Corps.

On 29 March 1918, he became commander of the 12th French Army Corps, which was stationed in Italy. At the same time, the Tenth Army returned to France, leaving only the 12th Army Corps on the Italian Front. Graziani thus became commander of the French troops in Italy, and helped to repulse in June the Austrian offensive during the Battle of the Piave River.
During the Battle of Vittorio Veneto, the final and decisive campaign of the theatre, the Italians gave him command of their 12th Army, with which he gained a great victory.

Upon his return to France, he became in April 1919 commander of the French Danube Army in Romania, and from August 1919-February 1920 was French representative to the Inter-Allied Military Mission in Hungary. In December 1920 he received command of the 18th French Army Corps.
From 1921 until his retirement in 1924, he was a member of the Conseil supérieur de la guerre.
