= 12th Army (Italy) =

Italian Twelfth Army
- 12ª Armata Italiana
- Country: Italy / France
- Allegiance: Kingdom of Italy
- Branch: Italian Army
- Type: Field army
- Engagements: Battle of Vittorio Veneto

Commanders
- Notable commanders: Jean César Graziani

The Italian Twelfth Army was a French-Italian Army which fought in World War I in the Battle of Vittorio Veneto.

== World War I ==
After the disastrous defeat at Caporetto (November 1917) the Italian Army was completely reorganized by Armando Diaz and a new 12th Italian Army was formed. It was in fact a French-Italian Army under command of French General Jean César Graziani.
It consisted of

- 1st Italian Army corps (Donato Etna)
- 23rd Division of the 12th French Army Corps (Ernest Bonfait)
- 52nd Alpine Division (Pietro Ronchi)

It played an important role in the successful Battle of Vittorio Veneto (October–November 1918).
