= 3rd Army (Italy) =

Field army of the Royal Italian Army

- 3ª Armata
- Active: August 1914 – July 1919; 6 June 1940 – 20 December 1940; 1952 – 31 March 1972
- Country: Kingdom of Italy (1914–1940); Italy (1952–1972)
- Branch: Royal Italian Army
- Type: Field Army
- Nickname: "La Armata Invitta" (The Undefeated Army)
- Engagements: World War I: Battles of the Isonzo; Battle of Caporetto; Second Battle of the Piave River; Battle of Vittorio Veneto

The 3rd Army (Italian: 3ª Armata) was a World War I and World War II field army of the Royal Italian Army and the only army-level command of the Italian Army during the Cold War.

== World War I ==
At the start of the participation of Italy in World War I (May 1915), the 3rd Army occupied the southern part of the Isonzo Front. It was commanded by Prince Emanuele Filiberto, Duke of Aosta and consisted of the

- VI Corps (Lieutenant General Carlo Ruelle),
- VII Corps (Lieutenant General Vincenzo Garioni),
- XI Corps (Lieutenant General Giorgio Cigliana).

The 3rd Army participated in all eleven Battles of the Isonzo (1914–1917). It withdrew in relative good order during the Caporetto disaster of October 1917 and played a leading role in the final victory offensive a year later. This gave it its name "La Armata Invitta" ("The undefeated Army"). The 3rd Army would go on to participate in the Second Battle of the Piave River and the Battle of Vittorio Veneto.

There is a museum of the 3rd Army in Padua.

== World War II ==
On 6 June 1940, the 3rd Army was formed and based in Southern Italy, Sicily and Sardinia. It was disbanded on 20 December 1940. Its commander was General Carlo Geloso.

== Cold War ==
As a founding member of NATO Italy was obliged to assign in case of war its military forces to NATO's integrated military command. While the Italian Air Force would have come under Fifth Allied Tactical Air Force (5 ATAF) in Vicenza, the Italian Army would have come under Allied Land Forces Southern Europe (LANDSOUTH) in Verona. However tensions between Italy and Yugoslavia over the Free Territory of Trieste were high and as Yugoslavia was not a Warsaw Pact member any conflict between the countries would have likely not involved NATO. Therefore on 1 May 1952 the Italian Army re-activated the 3rd Army in Padua to be able to circumvent NATO's chain of command in case a war would break out between Italy and Yugoslavia. 3rd Army duplicated the functions of LANDSOUTH with a purely Italian staff. To not violate NATO's integrated military command Italy described 3rd Army in all official documents as "the command designated "3rd Army"".

On the same date as the command designated "3rd Army" the army also activated two corps commands: the IV Army Corps in Bolzano and V Army Corps in Vittorio Veneto, followed by the VI Army Corps in Bologna in 1956 and the III Army Corps in Milan in 1957. During peacetime the corps' were assigned to the army's General Staff in Rome, while during wartime, depending on who the enemy would have been, the corps would have been assigned either to 3rd Army or LANDSOUTH.

However with the easing of tensions between Italy and Yugoslavia, which culminated in the division of the Trieste Free Territory with the Treaty of Osimo, the army decided to disband the command designated "3rd Army", along with VI Army Corps on 31 March 1972, with all the functions of higher command resting with LANDSOUTH from that date onward.
