= Giulio Cesare Tassoni =

Italian general

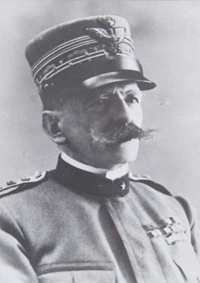

Italian Governor of Tripolitana
- In office 9 February – 15 July 1915
- Preceded by: Luigi Druetti
- Succeeded by: Giovanni Ameglio

Personal details
- Born: 27 February 1859 Montecchio Emilia
- Died: 10 October 1942 (aged 83) Rome
- Party: National Fascist Party
- Occupation: general, politician

Military service
- Rank: General officer
- Battles/wars: Italo-Turkish War; World War I World War II

Giulio Cesare Tassoni (27 February 1859 – 10 October 1942) was an Italian general and politician. He was the governor of Tripolitania for a few months in 1915, and was a member of the 30th Senate of the Kingdom of Italy.

During World War I, Tassoni had led IV corps at the Sixth Battle of the Isonzo in 1916, and later the 7th army at the battle of Vittorio Veneto in 1918.

== Biography ==
Giulio Cesare Tassoni was born into a noble family; his father was Francesco Tassoni and mother Diomira Palmieri. The family was from Montecchio Emilia, a town in the province of Reggio Emilia, which at the time of his birth was still subject to the government of the Duchy of Modena and Reggio.

Dedicated to a military career from an early age, Tassoni became a teacher for military history shortly after graduation in 1875. In 1902, he was promoted to colonel and obtained command of the 4th Bersaglieri Regiment. In 1909 he was promoted to the rank of major general, took command of the "Umbria" Brigade, and later the very prestigious "Granatieri di Sardegna" Brigade.

Tassoni took part in the Italo-Turkish War, where he earned the cross of officer of the Order of Merit of Savoy. In 1913 he was given the command of the 4th Special Division "Derna" in Libya, where he directed the operations that led to the Italian occupation of the Cyrenaica Plateau. He got promoted to lieutenant general for his contribution in battle.

After having commanded the Milan division for a short time, he returned to Cyrenaica at the beginning of 1915 and served as governor of Tripolitania, remaining there for a while before returning to Italy after the Italian entry into the First World War. During the war, he commanded the Bersaglieri division and later the IV Corps, the Carnia troops, the 5th provisional division, and the 7th Army, earning a silver medal and the cross of Grand Officer of the Military Order of Savoy.

In 1919 he was appointed to the Senate and subsequently retired from his military career. King Victor Emmanuel III conferred on him the title of Count Motu Proprio in 1926. He died in Rome on October 10, 1942.
