= The Italian generals of the Great War - C-Z =

The Italian generals of Great War, C-Z
- Author: Paolo Gaspari, Paolo Pozzato, Ferdinando Scala
- Original title: I generali italiani della Grande guerra, Atlante biografico, C-Z
- Language: Italian
- Genre: History
- Publisher: Gaspari editore, Udine, Italy
- Publication date: 2019
- Publication place: Italy
- Pages: 560 pages : illustrations; 24 cm
- OCLC: 1137847791
- LC Class: LCC: D507 .G37 2011
- Preceded by: I generali italiani della Grande guerra, A-B

The Italian Generals of the Great War, C-Z (original title: I generali italiani della Grande Guerra, C-Z) is an essay published by historians Paolo Gaspari, Paolo Pozzato and Ferdinando Scala in 2019, with an introduction by historian Filippo Cappellano and published in collaboration with the History Office of the Italian Army. It is the second volume of an encyclopedic series dedicated to the biographies of over six hundred Italian general officers who fought in the Great War on the Italian front and abroad, and concludes the work begun in 2011 with the publication of The Italian Generals of the Great War, A-B.

== Topic ==
The second volume in the series I generali italiani della Grande guerra completes a biographical reconstruction begun by Gaspari and Pozzato in 2011 and aimed at filling an important gap in Italian historiography.

The collective imagination of the First World War on the Italian front and, in part, the historiography developed on it up to the early years of the 21st century, has identified the ruling class of the Italian Royal Army as being primarily responsible for the high number of casualties in the conflict. This criticism, which came mainly from historians and memoirists with an anti-militarist culture, emphasized the negative aspects of the conflict, such as defeats like the retreat of Caporetto and extreme disciplinary aspects like summary shootings. This production also had important moments for the construction of the public reading of the First World War, as for example through the film Uomini contro by Francesco Rosi. In this, as in other works, the criticism of general officers was particularly determined by the need to demolish the imagery linked to militarism and interventionism, themes dear to the Fascist Regime in particular.

Until the appearance of the first volume of the series, the only biographical source available to scholars was the various editions of the Military Encyclopaedia (original title: Enciclopedia Militare), compiled during the Fascist period, which from a scientific point of view was at times too laudatory and certainly incomplete, since it lacked the profiles of all generals opposed to the regime, as well as those of Jewish origin. The authors have tried to fill this gap in their work by compiling biographies of the commanders of the Great War according to scientific criteria, including those who had been excluded for political reasons.

The second volume, which is the main body of the work, contains the biographies of several generals of great historical value, above all that of the two Chiefs of Staff of the Royal Army, Carlo Cadorna and Armando Diaz. There are also biographies of such notable figures as Prince Emanuele Filiberto Duke of Aosta, Luigi Capello, Riccardo Calcagno, Vittorio Camerana, Alberto Cavaciocchi, Emilio De Bono, Eugenio De Rossi, Giorgio Emo Capodilista, Giacinto Ferrero, Vincenzo Galasso, Gaetano Giardino, Maurizio Ferrante Gonzaga, Andrea Graziani, Ettore Mambretti, Luca Montuori, Achille Papa, Guglielmo Pecori Giraldi, Giuseppe Pennella, Alberto Pollio, Emanuele Pugliese, Armando Tallarigo, Ottavio Zoppi and Vittorio Zupelli.

As well as completing the work from the point of view of biographical apparatus, the second volume also contains the bibliography and index of names relating to the first.

== Editions ==
- I generali italiani della Grande guerra, atlante biografico C-Z (Collezione La Nuova Storia militare ed.). Udine: Gaspari Editore. 2019. ISBN 9788875414092.
