= Eurozone =

Area in which the euro is the official currency

Euro area
- Policy of: European Union
- Type: Monetary union
- Currency: Euro
- Established: 1 January 1999
- Member states: 21: Austria; Belgium; Bulgaria; Croatia; Cyprus; Estonia; Finland; France; Germany; Greece; Ireland; Italy; Latvia; Lithuania; Luxembourg; Malta; Netherlands; Portugal; Slovakia; Slovenia; Spain; Further usage

Governance
- Monetary authority: Eurosystem
- Political oversight: Eurogroup

Statistics
- Area: 2,912,546 km^{2} (1,124,540 sq mi)
- Population: 359,580,828 (1 January 2026)
- Density: 123/km^{2} (318.6/sq mi)
- GDP (nominal): €15.993 trillion; €44,600 (per capita) (2025)
- Interest rate: 2.5% (September 2026)
- Inflation: 3.8% (September 2026)
- Unemployment: 6.4% (August 2026)
- Trade balance: €310 billion trade surplus

The euro area (EA), commonly called the eurozone (EZ), is a currency union of 21 member states of the European Union (EU) that have adopted the euro (€) as their primary currency and sole legal tender, and have thus fully implemented Economic and Monetary Union policies.

The 21 eurozone members are: Austria, Belgium, Bulgaria, Croatia, Cyprus, Estonia, Finland, France, Germany, Greece, Ireland, Italy, Latvia, Lithuania, Luxembourg, Malta, the Netherlands, Portugal, Slovakia, Slovenia, and Spain.

The largest economies in the eurozone are Germany, France, Italy, and Spain. Four non-EU member states, namely Andorra, Monaco, San Marino, and Vatican City, have formal agreements with the EU to use the euro as their official currency and issue their own coins. In addition, Kosovo and Montenegro have adopted the euro unilaterally, relying on euros already in circulation rather than printing or minting currencies of their own. These six countries, however, have no representation in any eurozone institution.

The Eurosystem is the monetary authority of the eurozone, the Eurogroup is an informal body of finance ministers that makes fiscal policy for the currency union, and the European System of Central Banks is responsible for fiscal and monetary cooperation between eurozone and non-eurozone EU members. The European Central Bank (ECB) makes monetary policy for the eurozone, sets its base interest rate, and issues euro banknotes and coins. Since the 2008 financial crisis, the eurozone has established and used provisions for granting emergency loans to member states in return for enacting economic reforms. The eurozone has also enacted some limited fiscal integration; for example, in peer review of each other's national budgets. The issue is political and in a state of flux in terms of what further provisions will be agreed for eurozone change.

The eurozone comprises about half the countries in geographical Europe. Within the European Union (EU), six member states have not yet adopted the euro and continue to use their own national currencies: the Czech Republic, Denmark, Hungary, Poland, Romania, and Sweden. Of these, all except Denmark are legally committed to adopting the euro once they meet the required convergence criteria. To date, no country has left the eurozone, and there are no formal provisions for either voluntary withdrawal or expulsion.

== Territory ==
=== Eurozone ===
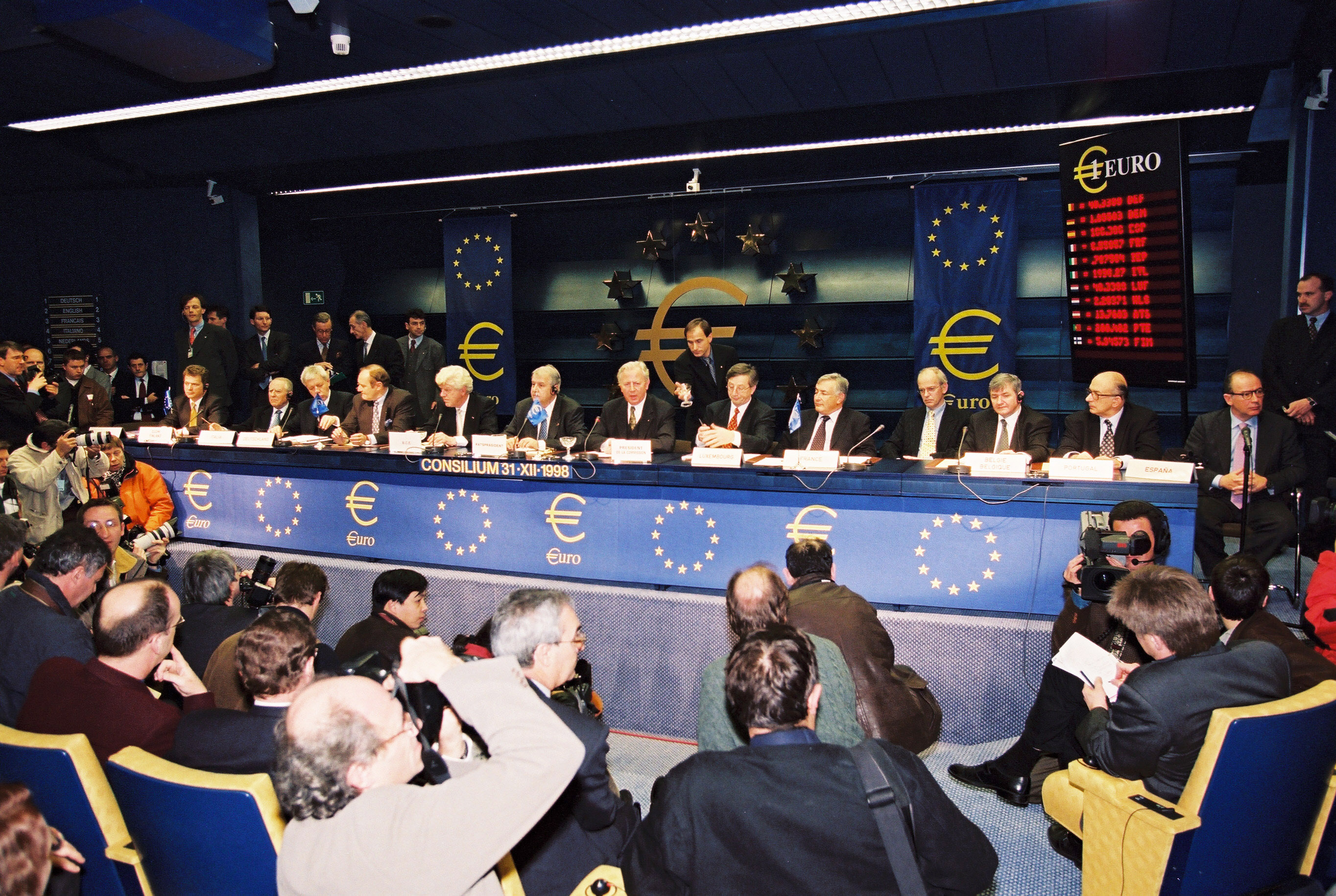
Press conference at the Council of the EU for the launching of the Euro in 1998

In 1998, eleven member states of the European Union had met the euro convergence criteria, and the eurozone came into existence with the official launch of the euro (alongside national currencies) on 1 January 1999 in those countries: Austria, Belgium, Finland, France, Germany, Ireland, Italy, Luxembourg, the Netherlands, Portugal, and Spain. Greece qualified in 2000 and was admitted on 1 January 2001.

These twelve founding members introduced physical euro banknotes and euro coins on 1 January 2002. After a short transition period, they took out of circulation and rendered invalid their pre-euro national coins and notes.

Between 2007 and 2026, nine more states have acceded: Bulgaria, Croatia, Cyprus, Estonia, Latvia, Lithuania, Malta, Slovakia, and Slovenia.

State	ISO code	Adopted on 1 Jan of	Population in 2024	Nominal GNI in 2024			Pre-euro currency	Conversion rate of euro to pre-euro currency	Pre-euro currency was also used in	Territories where euro is not used
State	ISO code	Adopted on 1 Jan of	Population in 2024	(USD millions)	As fraction of eurozone total	Per capita in 2024 in USD	Pre-euro currency	Conversion rate of euro to pre-euro currency	Pre-euro currency was also used in	Territories where euro is not used
Austria	AT	1999	9,158,750	502,607	3.20%	54,877	schilling	13.7603		
Belgium	BE	1999	11,832,049	655,615	4.18%	55,410	franc	40.3399	Luxembourg	
Bulgaria	BG	2026	6,437,360	98,994	0.00% (Note: Bulgaria was not part of the Eurozone in 2024)	15,378	lev	1.95583		
Croatia	HR	2023	3,861,967	86,014	0.55%	22,272	kuna	7.53450		
Cyprus	CY	2008	933,505	31,982	0.20%	34,260	pound	0.585274		Northern Cyprus (Note: The self-declared Turkish Republic of Northern Cyprus is not recognised by the EU and uses the Turkish lira. However, the euro does circulate widely.)
Estonia	EE	2011	1,374,687	39,628	0.25%	28,827	kroon	15.6466		
Finland	FI	1999	5,603,851	290,286	1.85%	51,801	markka	5.94573		
France	FR	1999	68,401,997	3,096,055	19.73%	45,263	franc	6.55957	Andorra; Monaco	New Caledonia (Note: French Pacific territories use the CFP franc, which is pegged to the euro at the rate of 1 franc to 0.00838 euro.); French Polynesia; Wallis and Futuna
Germany	DE	1999	83,445,000	4,601,091	29.32%	55,139	mark	1.95583	Kosovo; Montenegro	
Greece	GR (Note: The European Union internally uses the code EL for Greece, a deviation from the ISO 3166-1 standard.)	2001	10,397,193	236,498	1.51%	22,746	drachma	340.750		
Ireland	IE	1999	5,343,805	435,172	2.77%	81,435	pound	0.787564		
Italy	IT	1999	58,989,749	2,275,197	14.50%	38,569	lira	1936.27	San Marino; Vatican City	
Latvia	LV	2014	1,871,882	40,360	0.26%	21,561	lats	0.702804		
Lithuania	LT	2015	2,885,891	78,419	0.50%	27,173	litas	3.45280		
Luxembourg	LU	1999	672,050	57,311	0.37%	85,278	franc	40.3399	Belgium	
Malta	MT	2008	563,443	20,893	0.13%	37,081	lira	0.429300		
Netherlands	NL	1999	17,942,942	1,124,891	7.17%	62,693	guilder	2.20371		Aruba (Note: Aruba is part of the Kingdom of the Netherlands, but not of the EU. It uses the Aruban florin, which is pegged to the US dollar at the rate of 1 dollar to 1.79 florins.); Curaçao (Note: Used the Netherlands Antillean guilder until the introduction of the Caribbean guilder on 31 March 2025, after the change was delayed several times. "CBCS wants to have the Caribbean guilder introduced by 2025". Curaçao Chronicle. 16 March 2022. Archived from the original on 6 October 2022. "Frequent Asked Questions". Centrale Bank Curaçao & Sint Maarten. Archived from the original on 2 August 2022. Both are pegged to the US dollar at the rate of 1 dollar to 1.79 guilders.); Sint Maarten; Caribbean Netherlands (Note: Uses the US dollar.)
Portugal	PT	1999	10,639,726	287,747	1.83%	27,045	escudo	200.482		
Slovakia	SK	2009	5,459,781	127,769	0.81%	23,402	koruna	30.1260		
Slovenia	SI	2007	2,123,949	67,629	0.43%	31,841	tolar	239.640		
Spain	ES	1999	48,610,458	1,638,781	10.44%	33,713	peseta	166.386	Andorra	
Eurozone total	EZ (Note: EZ is not assigned, but is reserved for this purpose, in ISO 3166-1.)	—N/a	356,550,035	15,693,946	100.00%	44,016	—N/a	—N/a	—N/a	See above

=== Dependent territories of EU member states not part of the EU ===
Three French dependent territories that are not part of the EU have adopted the euro, with France ensuring eurozone laws are implemented:

- Territorial collectivity of Saint Barthélemy
- Overseas Collectivity of Saint-Pierre and Miquelon
- French Southern and Antarctic Lands

=== Non-member usage ===
Eurozone participation European Union member states (special territories not shown) 21 in the eurozone 1 in ERM II, with an opt-out (Denmark) 5 not in ERM II, but committed to join the eurozone after meeting the convergence criteria (Czech Republic, Hungary, Poland, Romania, and Sweden) Non–EU member states 4 using the euro with a monetary agreement (Andorra, Monaco, San Marino, and Vatican City) 2 using the euro unilaterally (Kosovo and Montenegro)

==== With formal agreement ====
The euro is also used in countries outside the EU. Four microstates (Andorra, Monaco, San Marino, and Vatican City) have signed formal agreements with the EU to use the euro and issue their own coins. Nevertheless, they are not considered part of the eurozone by the ECB and do not have a seat in the ECB or Euro Group.

Akrotiri and Dhekelia are located on the island of Cyprus but are British Overseas Territories which are part of the United Kingdom. There are agreements between the United Kingdom and Cyprus and between United Kingdom and EU about their partial adoption of Cypriot law, including the usage of euro in Akrotiri and Dhekelia.

Several currencies are pegged to the euro, some of them with a fluctuation band and others with an exact rate. The Bosnia and Herzegovina convertible mark was once pegged to the Deutsche mark at par, and continues to be pegged to the euro today at the Deutsche mark's old rate (1.95583 per euro). The West African and Central African CFA francs are pegged exactly at 655.957 CFA to 1 EUR. In 1998, in anticipation of Economic and Monetary Union of the European Union, the Council of the European Union addressed the monetary agreements France had with the CFA Zone and Comoros, and ruled that the ECB had no obligation towards the convertibility of the CFA and Comorian francs. The responsibility of the free convertibility remained in the French Treasury.

==== Without formal agreement ====
Kosovo and Montenegro unilaterally adopted the euro as their sole currency without an agreement and, therefore, have no issuing rights. These states are not considered part of the eurozone by the ECB. However, sometimes the term eurozone is applied to all territories that have adopted the euro as their sole currency. Further unilateral adoption of the euro (euroisation), by both non-euro EU and non-EU members, is opposed by the ECB and EU.

=== Historical eurozone enlargements and exchange-rate regimes for EU members ===
The chart below provides a full summary of all applying exchange-rate regimes for EU members, since the birth, on 13 March 1979, of the European Monetary System with its Exchange Rate Mechanism and the related new common currency ECU. On 1 January 1999, the euro replaced the ECU 1:1 at the exchange rate markets. During 1979–1999, the Deutsche Mark functioned as a de facto anchor for the ECU, meaning there was only a minor difference between pegging a currency against the ECU and pegging it against the Deutsche Mark.

Sources: EC convergence reports 1996-2014, Italian lira, Spanish peseta, Portuguese escudo, Finnish markka, Greek drachma, Sterling

The eurozone was established with its first 11 member states on 1 January 1999. The first enlargement of the eurozone, to Greece, took place on 1 January 2001, one year before the euro physically entered into circulation. The next enlargements were to states which joined the EU in 2004, and then joined the eurozone on 1 January of the year noted: Slovenia in 2007, Cyprus and Malta in 2008, Slovakia in 2009, Estonia in 2011, Latvia in 2014, and Lithuania in 2015. Croatia, which joined the EU in 2013, adopted the euro in 2023; while Bulgaria, which joined in 2007, adopted the euro in 2026.

All new EU members joining the bloc after the signing of the Maastricht Treaty in 1992 committed to adopt the euro under the terms of their accession treaties once they comply with the five economic convergence criteria. The last of these is the exchange rate stability criterion, which requires having been an ERM-member for a minimum of two years without the presence of "severe tensions" for the currency exchange rate.

In September 2011, a diplomatic source close to the euro adoption preparation talks with the seven remaining new member states who had yet to adopt the euro at that time (Bulgaria, the Czech Republic, Hungary, Latvia, Lithuania, Poland, and Romania), claimed that the monetary union (eurozone) they had thought they were going to join upon their signing of the accession treaty may very well end up being a very different union, entailing a much closer fiscal, economic, and political convergence than originally anticipated. This changed legal status of the eurozone could potentially cause them to conclude that the conditions for their promise to join were no longer valid, which "could force them to stage new referendums" on euro adoption.

=== Future enlargement ===
A clickable Euler diagram showing the relationships between various European regional organisations

Six countries (the Czech Republic, Denmark, Hungary, Poland, Romania, and Sweden) are EU members but do not use the euro.

Before joining the eurozone, a state must spend at least two years in the European Exchange Rate Mechanism (ERM II). As of January 2026, only the central bank of Denmark participates in ERM II.

Denmark obtained a special opt-out in the Maastricht Treaty, and thus is legally exempt from joining the eurozone unless its government decides otherwise, either by parliamentary vote or referendum. The United Kingdom likewise had an opt-out prior to withdrawing from the EU in 2020.

The remaining five countries have committed to adopt the euro in future, once they meet the convergence criteria. They should join as soon as they do so, which include being part of ERM II for two years. Sweden, which joined the EU in 1995 after the Maastricht Treaty was signed, rejected euro adoption in a 2003 referendum and since then the country has intentionally avoided fulfilling the adoption requirements by not joining ERM II, which is voluntary.

Interest in joining the eurozone increased in Denmark, and initially in Poland, as a result of the 2008 financial crisis. In Iceland, there was an increase in interest in joining the European Union, a pre-condition for adopting the euro. However, by 2010 the debt crisis in the eurozone caused interest from Poland, as well as the Czech Republic, Denmark and Sweden to cool.

At the time of Bulgaria’s euro adoption in 2026, the Polish government under Donald Tusk has expressed a lack of economic readiness to join, and the Polish president Karol Nawrocki has said that he is explicitly against Poland's future adoption of the euro.

=== Expulsion and withdrawal ===
In the opinion of journalist Leigh Phillips and Charles Proctor from the US law firm Locke Lord, there is no provision in any European Union treaty for an exit from the eurozone. In fact, they argued, the Treaties make it clear that the process of monetary union was intended to be "irreversible" and "irrevocable". However, in 2009, a European Central Bank legal study argued that, while voluntary withdrawal is legally not possible, expulsion remains "conceivable". Although an explicit provision for an exit option does not exist, many experts and politicians in Europe have suggested an option to leave the eurozone should be included in the relevant treaties.

On the issue of leaving the eurozone, the European Commission has stated that "[t]he irrevocability of membership in the euro area is an integral part of the Treaty framework and the Commission, as a guardian of the EU Treaties, intends to fully respect [that irrevocability]." It added that it "does not intend to propose [any] amendment" to the relevant Treaties, the current status being "the best way going forward to increase the resilience of euro area Member States to potential economic and financial crises". The European Central Bank, responding to a question by a Member of the European Parliament, has stated that an exit is not allowed under the Treaties.

Likewise there is no provision for a state to be expelled from the euro. Some, however, including the Dutch government, favour the creation of an expulsion provision for the case whereby a heavily indebted state in the eurozone refuses to comply with an EU economic reform policy.

In a Texas law journal, University of Texas at Austin law professor Jens Dammann has argued that even now EU law contains an implicit right for member states to leave the eurozone if they no longer meet the criteria that they had to meet in order to join it. Furthermore, he has suggested that, under narrow circumstances, the European Union can expel member states from the eurozone.

== Administration and representation ==
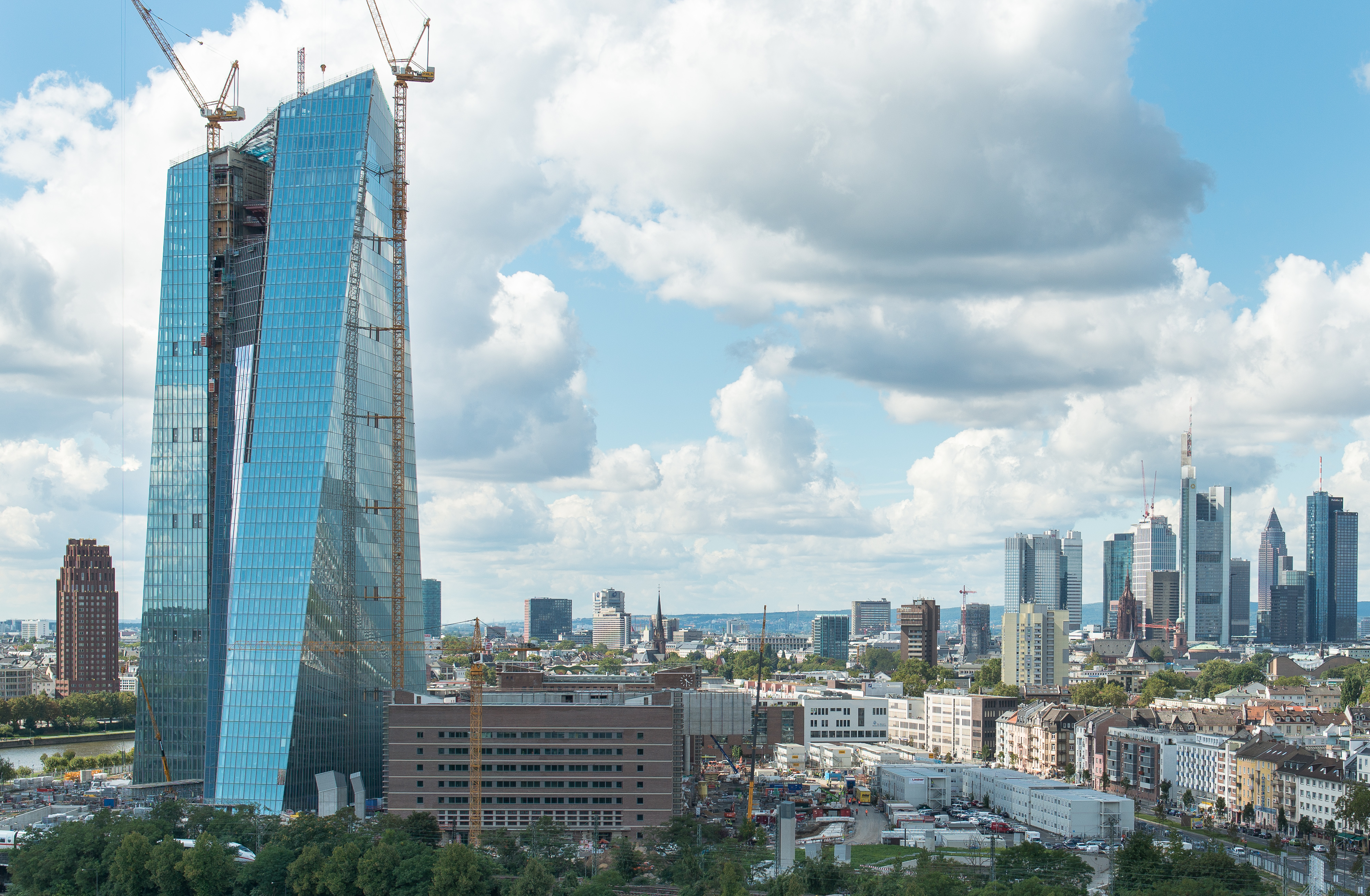
The European Central Bank (seat in Frankfurt depicted) is the supranational monetary authority of the eurozone.

The monetary policy of all countries in the eurozone is managed by the European Central Bank (ECB) and the Eurosystem which comprises the ECB and the central banks of the EU states who have joined the eurozone. Countries outside the eurozone are not represented in these institutions. Whereas all EU member states are part of the European System of Central Banks (ESCB), non EU member states have no say in all three institutions, even those with monetary agreements such as Monaco. The ECB is entitled to authorise the design and printing of euro banknotes and the volume of euro coins minted, and its president is currently Christine Lagarde.

The eurozone is represented politically by its finance ministers, known collectively as the Eurogroup, and is presided over by a president, currently Kyriakos Pierrakakis. The finance ministers of the EU member states that use the euro meet a day before a meeting of the Economic and Financial Affairs Council (Ecofin) of the Council of the European Union. The Group is not an official Council formation but when the full EcoFin council votes on matters only affecting the eurozone, only Euro Group members are permitted to vote on it.

Since the 2008 financial crisis, the Euro Group has met irregularly not as finance ministers, but as heads of state and government (like the European Council). It is in this forum, the Euro summit, that many eurozone reforms have been decided upon. In 2011, former French President Nicolas Sarkozy pushed for these summits to become regular and twice a year in order for it to be a 'true economic government'.

=== Reform ===
In April 2008 in Brussels, future European Commission President Jean-Claude Juncker suggested that the eurozone should be represented at the IMF as a bloc, rather than each member state separately: "It is absurd for those 15 countries not to agree to have a single representation at the IMF. It makes us look absolutely ridiculous. We are regarded as buffoons on the international scene". In 2017 Juncker stated that he aims to have this agreed by the end of his mandate in 2019. However, Finance Commissioner Joaquín Almunia stated that before there is common representation, a common political agenda should be agreed upon.

Leading EU figures including the commission and national governments have proposed a variety of reforms to the eurozone's architecture; notably the creation of a Finance Minister, a larger eurozone budget, and reform of the current bailout mechanisms into either a "European Monetary Fund" or a eurozone Treasury. While many have similar themes, details vary greatly.

== Economy ==
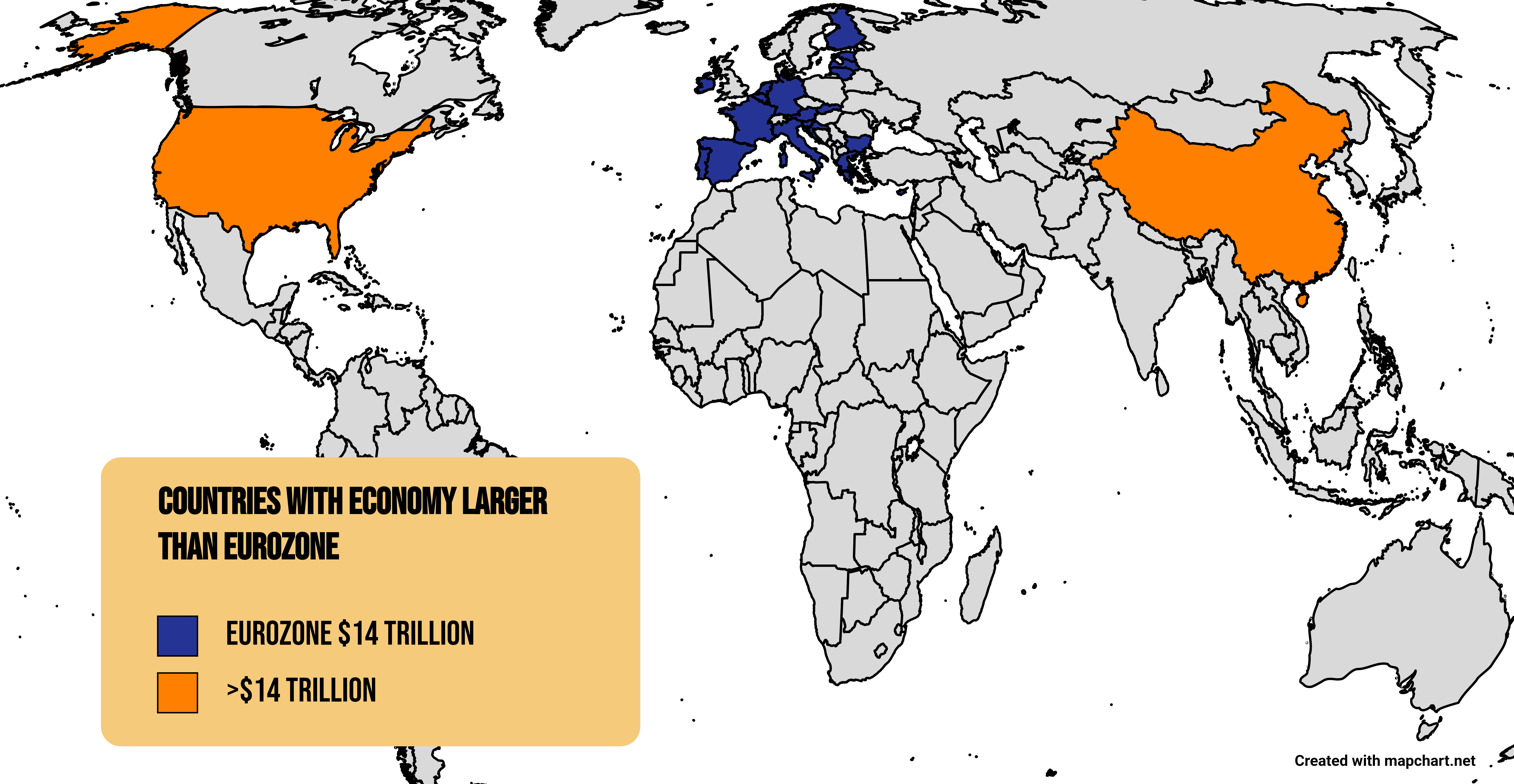
Countries with economy larger than the eurozone

=== Comparison table ===
Comparison of the eurozone with US and China
	Population (2026)	GDP (Local currency) (2025)	GDP (US$) (2025)
China	1405 million	CNY 140.188 trillion	US$ 19.626 trillion
Eurozone	360 million	EUR 15.937 trillion	US$ 18.018 trillion
United States	342 million	USD 30.762 trillion	US$ 30.762 trillion

Comparison with economies of individual sovereign countries
Economy	Nominal GDP (billions in USD) – Peak year as of 2025
(01) United States (Peak in 2025)	30,616
(02) China (Peak in 2025)	19,399
(03) Eurozone (Peak in 2025)	17,749
(04) Japan (Peak in 2012)	6,272
(05) India (Peak in 2025)	4,125
(06) United Kingdom (Peak in 2025)	3,959
(07) Brazil (Peak in 2011)	2,614
(08) Russia (Peak in 2025)	2,541
(09) Canada (Peak in 2025)	2,284
(10) South Korea (Peak in 2021)	1,942
(11) Mexico (Peak in 2025)	1,863
(12) Australia (Peak in 2025)	1,830
(13) Turkey (Peak in 2025)	1,565
(14) Indonesia (Peak in 2025)	1,443
(15) Saudi Arabia (Peak in 2025)	1,269
(16) Poland (Peak in 2025)	1,040
(17) Switzerland (Peak in 2025)	1,003
(18) Taiwan (Peak in 2025)	884
(19) Argentina (Peak in 2025)	683
(20) Sweden (Peak in 2025)	662
The 20 current largest economies in the world including eurozone as a single entity, by nominal GDP (2025) at their peak level of GDP in billions US$. The values for EU members that are not eurozone members are listed separately.

=== Inflation ===
HICP figures from the ECB, overall index:

- 2000: 2.1%
- 2001: 2.3%
- 2002: 2.3%
- 2003: 2.1%
- 2004: 2.1%
- 2005: 2.2%
- 2006: 2.2%
- 2007: 2.1%
- 2008: 3.3%
- 2009: 0.3%
- 2010: 1.6%
- 2011: 2.7%
- 2012: 2.5%
- 2013: 1.4%
- 2014: 0.4%
- 2015: 0.2%
- 2016: 0.2%
- 2017: 1.5%
- 2018: 1.8%
- 2019: 1.2%
- 2020: 0.3%
- 2021: 2.6%
- 2022: 8.4%
- 2023: 5.4%
- 2024: 2.4%
- 2025: 2.0%

=== Interest rates ===
Interest rates for the eurozone, set by the ECB since 1999. Levels are in percentages per annum. Between June 2000 and October 2008, the main refinancing operations were variable rate tenders, as opposed to fixed rate tenders. The figures indicated in the table from 2000 to 2008 refer to the minimum interest rate at which counterparties may place their bids.

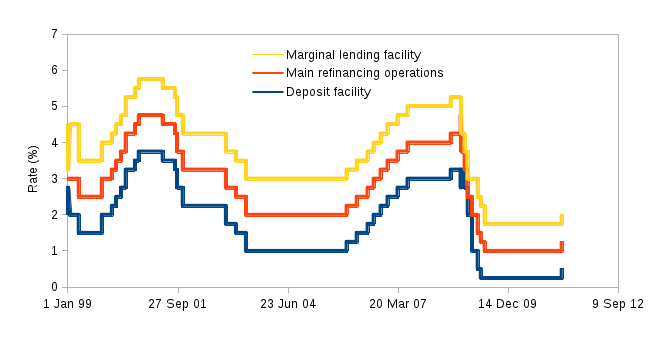

=== Public debt ===
The following table states the ratio of public debt to GDP in percent for eurozone countries given by EuroStat. The euro convergence criterion is to not exceed 60%.

Country	2007	2008	2009	2010	2011	2012	2013	2014	2015	2016	2017	2018	2019	2020	2021	2022	2023	2024	2025
Eurozone	64.9	69.6	80.2	85.7	87.6	91.0	93.0	93.1	91.2	90.4	87.9	85.8	83.8	97.2	95.6	94.2	89.9	87.4	88.5
Austria	64.7	68.7	79.7	82.7	82.4	81.9	81.3	84.0	84.9	82.8	78.5	74.1	70.6	83.3	82.8	82.7	78.2	81.8	83.7
Belgium	87.0	93.2	99.6	100.3	103.5	104.8	105.5	107.0	105.2	105.0	102.0	99.8	97.7	112.8	108.2	108.3	108.0	104.7	107.1
Bulgaria	NA	NA	NA	NA	NA	NA	17.0	27.0	25.9	29.1	25.1	22.2	20.1	24.5	23.8	23.1	21.0	24.1	28.4
Croatia	37.2	39.1	48.4	57.3	63.7	69.4	80.3	83.9	83.3	79.8	76.7	73.3	71.1	87.3	79.8	74.3	64.4	57.6	57.2
Cyprus	53.5	45.5	53.9	56.3	65.8	80.3	104.0	109.1	108.9	107.1	97.5	100.6	91.1	115.0	103.6	95.2	79.4	65.0	60.6
Estonia	3.7	4.5	7.0	6.6	5.9	9.8	10.2	10.6	9.7	9.4	9.0	8.4	8.6	19.0	18.1	16.7	18.2	23.6	22.9
Finland	34.0	32.6	41.7	47.1	48.5	53.6	56.2	59.8	63.1	63.1	61.4	59.0	59.5	69.0	65.8	72.1	73.8	82.1	86.8
France	64.3	68.8	79.0	81.7	85.2	90.6	93.4	94.9	95.8	96.5	97.0	98.4	97.5	114.6	112.9	113.1	111.9	113.0	117.7
Germany	63.7	65.5	72.4	81.0	78.3	81.1	78.7	75.6	71.2	68.1	64.1	61.9	58.9	68.7	69.3	67.2	64.8	62.5	63.0
Greece	103.1	109.4	126.7	146.2	172.1	161.9	178.4	180.2	176.9	180.8	178.6	181.2	180.7	206.3	193.3	182.1	165.5	153.6	149.7
Ireland	23.9	42.4	61.8	86.8	109.1	119.9	119.9	104.2	93.8	72.8	68.0	63.6	57.2	58.4	56.0	51.4	43.6	40.9	32.8
Italy	99.8	106.2	112.5	115.4	116.5	126.5	132.5	135.4	132.7	132.0	131.8	134.8	134.3	155.3	150.8	150.2	140.6	135.3	137.8
Latvia	8.0	18.6	36.6	47.5	42.8	42.2	40.0	41.6	36.4	40.6	40.1	36.4	36.7	43.3	44.8	41.6	41.4	46.8	45.2
Lithuania	15.9	14.6	29.0	36.2	37.2	39.7	38.7	40.5	42.7	40.1	39.7	34.1	35.9	46.6	44.3	39.6	37.4	38.2	40.7
Luxembourg	7.7	15.4	16.0	20.1	19.1	22.0	23.7	22.7	21.4	20.8	23.0	21.0	22.3	24.8	24.4	25.4	25.7	26.3	27.9
Malta	62.3	61.8	67.8	67.6	69.9	65.9	65.8	61.6	63.9	57.6	50.8	45.8	40.7	53.4	57.0	55.1	49.3	47.4	46.5
Netherlands	42.7	54.7	56.5	59.0	61.7	66.3	67.7	67.9	65.1	61.8	56.7	52.4	48.5	54.3	52.1	50.9	45.9	43.3	42.4
Portugal	68.4	75.6	83.6	96.2	111.4	129.0	131.4	132.9	129.0	130.1	125.7	122.2	116.6	135.2	127.4	123.4	107.5	94.9	97.6
Slovakia	30.1	28.6	41.0	43.3	43.3	51.8	54.7	53.6	52.9	51.8	50.9	49.4	48.1	59.7	63.1	60.3	58.6	59.3	62.3
Slovenia	22.8	21.8	36.0	40.8	46.6	53.6	70.0	80.3	83.2	78.5	73.6	70.4	65.6	79.8	74.7	73.5	71.4	67.0	67.6
Spain	35.6	39.7	52.7	60.1	69.5	86.3	95.8	100.7	99.2	99.0	98.3	97.6	95.5	120.0	118.4	116.1	109.8	101.8	103.2

=== Fiscal policies ===
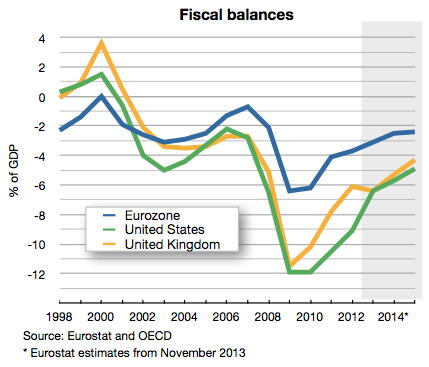
Comparison of government surplus/deficit (2001–2012) of eurozone, United States and United Kingdom

The primary means for fiscal coordination within the EU lies in the Broad Economic Policy Guidelines which are written for every member state, but with particular reference to the 21 current members of the eurozone. These guidelines are not binding, but are intended to represent policy coordination among the EU member states, so as to take into account the linked structures of their economies.

For their mutual assurance and stability of the currency, members of the eurozone have to respect the Stability and Growth Pact, which sets agreed limits on deficits and national debt, with associated sanctions for deviation. The Pact originally set a limit of 3% of GDP for the yearly deficit of all eurozone member states; with fines for any state which exceeded this amount. In 2005, Portugal, Germany, and France had all exceeded this amount, but the Council of Ministers had not voted to fine those states. Subsequently, reforms were adopted to provide more flexibility and ensure that the deficit criteria took into account the economic conditions of the member states, and additional factors.

The Fiscal Compact (formally, the Treaty on Stability, Coordination and Governance in the Economic and Monetary Union), is an intergovernmental treaty introduced as a new stricter version of the Stability and Growth Pact, signed on 2 March 2012 by all member states of the European Union (EU), except the Czech Republic, the United Kingdom, and Croatia (subsequently acceding the EU in July 2013). The treaty entered into force on 1 January 2013 for the 16 states which completed ratification prior of this date. As of 1 April 2014, it had been ratified and entered into force for all 25 signatories.

Olivier Blanchard suggests that a fiscal union in the eurozone can mitigate devastating effects of the single currency on the eurozone peripheral countries. But he adds that the currency bloc will not work perfectly even if a fiscal transfer system is built, because, he argues, the fundamental issue about competitiveness adjustment is not tackled. The problem is, since the eurozone peripheral countries do not have their own currencies, they are forced to adjust their economies by decreasing their wages instead of devaluation.

== Bailout provisions ==
The 2008 financial crisis prompted several reforms in the eurozone. One was a U-turn on the eurozone's bailout policy that led to the creation of a specific fund to assist eurozone states in trouble. The European Financial Stability Facility (EFSF) and the European Financial Stability Mechanism (EFSM) were created in 2010 to provide, alongside the International Monetary Fund (IMF), a system and fund to bail out members. However, the EFSF and EFSM were temporary, small and lacked a basis in the EU treaties. Therefore, it was agreed in 2011 to establish a European Stability Mechanism (ESM) which would be much larger, funded only by eurozone states (not the EU as a whole as the EFSF/EFSM were) and would have a permanent treaty basis. As a result of that its creation involved agreeing an amendment to TEFU Article 136 allowing for the ESM and a new ESM treaty to detail how the ESM would operate. The ESM became operational in September 2012.

In February 2016, the UK secured further confirmation that countries that do not use the Euro would not be required to contribute to bailouts for eurozone countries.

== Peer review ==
In June 2010, a broad agreement was finally reached on a controversial proposal for member states to peer review each other's budgets prior to their presentation to national parliaments. Although showing the entire budget to each other was opposed by Germany, Sweden and the UK, each government would present to their peers and the Commission their estimates for growth, inflation, revenue and expenditure levels six months before they go to national parliaments. If a country was to run a deficit, they would have to justify it to the rest of the EU while countries with a debt more than 60% of GDP would face greater scrutiny.

The plans would apply to all EU members, not just the eurozone, and have to be approved by EU leaders along with proposals for states to face sanctions before they reach the 3% limit in the Stability and Growth Pact. Poland has criticised the idea of withholding regional funding for those who break the deficit limits, as that would only impact the poorer states. In June 2010 France agreed to back Germany's plan for suspending the voting rights of members who breach the rules. In March 2011 was initiated a new reform of the Stability and Growth Pact aiming at straightening the rules by adopting an automatic procedure for imposing of penalties in case of breaches of either the deficit or the debt rules.

== Criticism ==
In 1997, Arnulf Baring expressed concern that the European Monetary Union would make Germans the most hated people in Europe. Baring suspected the possibility that the people in Mediterranean countries would regard Germans and the currency bloc as economic policemen.

In 2001, James Tobin thought that the euro project would not succeed without making drastic changes to European institutions, pointing out the difference between the US and the eurozone. Concerning monetary policies, the system of Federal Reserve banks in the US aims at both growth and reducing unemployment, while the ECB tends to give its first priority to price stability under the Bundesbank's supervision. As the price level of the currency bloc is kept low, the unemployment level of the region has become higher than that of the US since 1982. Concerning fiscal policies, 12% of the US federal budget is used for transfers to states and local governments. The US government does not impose restrictions on state budget policies, whereas the Maastricht Treaty requires each eurozone member country to keep its budget deficit below 3% of its GDP.

In 2008, a study by Alberto Alesina and Vincenzo Galasso found that the adoption of euro promoted market deregulation and market liberalization. Furthermore, the euro was also linked to wage moderation, as wage growth slowed down in countries that adopted the new currency. Oliver Hart, who received the Nobel Memorial Prize in Economic Sciences in 2016, criticized the euro, calling it a "mistake" and emphasising his opposition to monetary union since its inception. He also expressed opposition to European integration, arguing that the European Union should instead focus on decentralisation as it has "gone too far in centralising power". In 2018, a study based on DiD methodology found that the adoption of euro produced no systematic growth effects, as no growth-enhancing effects were found when compared to European economies outside the eurozone.

The eurozone has also been criticized for deepening inequality in Europe, particularly between the richest and poorest countries. According to a study by Bertelsmann Stiftung, countries such as Austria and the Netherlands benefited significantly from the common currency, while southern and eastern European members of the eurozone gained very little, and some countries are considered to have suffered adverse effects from adopting the euro. In an article for Politico, Joseph Stiglitz argues that "[t]he result for the eurozone has been slower growth, and especially for the weaker countries within it. The euro was supposed to usher in greater prosperity, which in turn would lead to renewed commitment to European integration. It has done just the opposite — increasing divisions within the EU, especially between creditor and debtor countries." Matthias Matthijs believes that the euro resulted in a "winner-take-all" economy, as national income differences between eurozone members have widened further. He argues that countries such as Austria and Germany have gained from the eurozone at the expense of southern countries like Italy and Spain.

By adopting the euro and abandoning their national currencies, eurozone countries gave up their ability to conduct independent monetary policy; as such, monetary policies used to combat recession, such as monetary stimulus or currency devaluation, are no longer available. During the European debt crisis, several eurozone countries (Greece, Italy, Portugal, Ireland, Spain, and Cyprus) were unable to repay their debt without third-party intervention by the European Central Bank and the International Monetary Fund. In order to grant the bailout, the ECB and the IMF forced the affected countries to adopt strict austerity measures. The European bailouts were largely about shifting exposure from banks onto European taxpayers, and exacerbated issues such as high unemployment and poverty.

In 2019, a study from the Centre for European Policy concluded that while some countries had gained from adopting the euro, several countries were poorer than they would have been had they not adopted it, with France and Italy being particularly affected. The publication prompted a large number of reactions, pushing its authors to put out a statement clarifying some points. In 2020, a study from the University of Bonn reached a different conclusion: the adoption of the euro made "some mild losers (France, Germany, Italy, and Portugal) and a clear winner (Ireland)". Both studies used the synthetic control method to estimate what might have happened if the euro had not been adopted.

== See also ==
- Capital Markets Union
- Craiova Group
- Economic and Monetary Union of the European Union
- European banking union
- Single Euro Payments Area
- List of acronyms associated with the eurozone crisis
- List of people associated with the eurozone crisis
- Open Balkan
- Sixpack (European Union law)
- Special territories of members of the European Economic Area
