= Battle of Ettangi =

Senussi-Italian battle

- Part of the First Italo-Senussi War
Date	18 – 19 June 1913
Location	Ettangi, 15 kilometers south-west of Derna, Libya
Result	Italian victory: Breaking of the encirclement of the Italian garrison in Derna
Territorial changes	Destruction of the rebel camp in Ettangi and capture by the Italians

Belligerents
Kingdom of Italy	Senussi Order

Commanders and leaders
(Kingdom of Italy) Tommaso Salsa	Unknown

Casualties and losses
26 dead and 236 wounded	500 dead, wounded and captured

Ettangi is a town near Derna (in Cyrenaica) known for the battle fought between Italian soldiers and Libyan guerrillas on from 18 — 19 June 1913. The battle ended in a disastrous Libyan defeat.

== Background ==
A first attempt to expel the Libyan guerrillas from Ettangi, in order to begin the occupation of the Libyan hinterland, took place on 16 May 1913, which however failed, causing unfavorable political repercussions.

== Preparations and Battle ==
On 18 June 1913, General Tommaso Salsa decided to try the action again by advancing from Cyrene, together with the general Tassoni's division. Three Italian columns, commanded by General Salsa, moved towards the rebel camp of Ettangi with the precise aim of destroying it. The columns were made up of the following departments: the one on the right (General Cavaciocchi: 4 Alpine battalions, 2 Eritrean, 4 mountain batteries), on the left (General Mambretti: 4 infantry battalions, 2 mountain batteries and one field battery, another 3 infantry battalions in reserve); central, connecting the other two (Colonel Arista, with 2 infantry battalions and a company of Libyan askari).

On 19 June the Italian troops conquered the enemy outposts. The battle ended the following day with the capture of Sidi Garbàa and Ettangi. The enemy camp was found abandoned and before leaving it the Libyan guerrillas destroyed the powder magazines and the food stores.
