= Asiago War Memorial =

World War I memorial in Asiago, Italy

Coordinates: 45°52′28.61″N 11°31′13.59″E

Sacrario militare di Asiago
- Italy
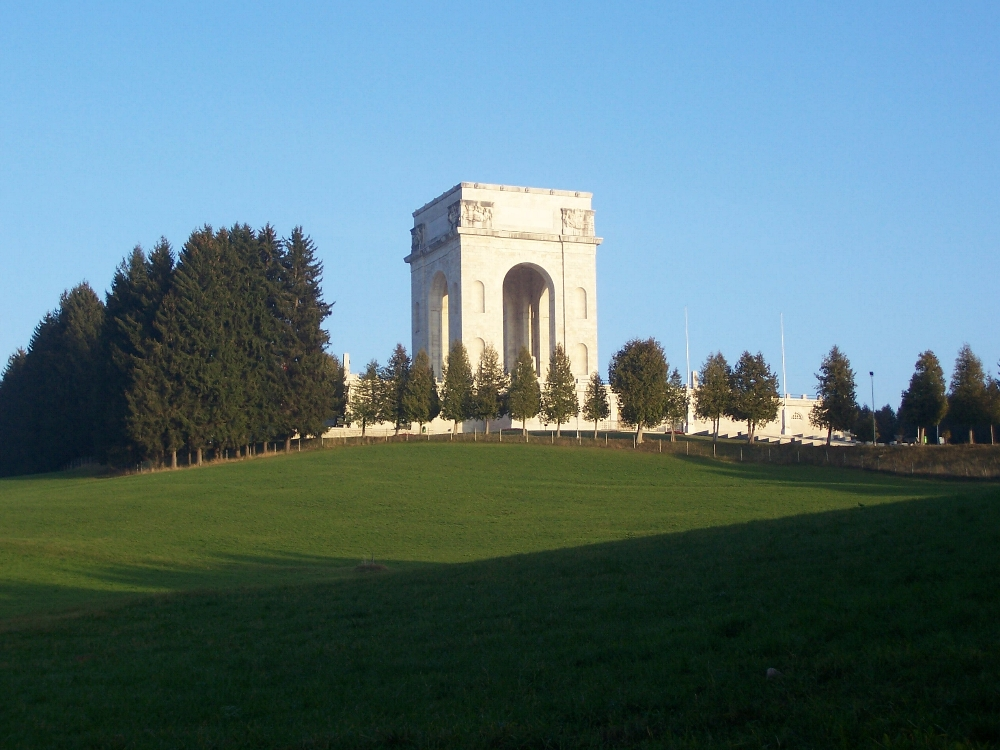
- For Italian and Austro-Hungarian soldiers who died on the battles on the Asiago plateau in World War I
- Unveiled: 17 July 1938 (inaugurated)
- Designed by: Orfeo Rossato

The Asiago War Memorial is a World War I memorial located in the town of Asiago in the Province of Vicenza in the Veneto region of northeast Italy. Surrounded by mountains that were the site of several World War I battles, the monument houses the remains of over 50,000 Italian and Austro-Hungarian soldiers and is a popular destination for travelers to the region. In Italian the memorial is called Sacrario Militare di Asiago or Sacrario Militare del Leiten. Leiten is the name of the hill on which the memorial sits.

== Background and Construction ==
Asiago was one of the most symbolic locations of the Great War, having been overrun at the end of May 1916 by the Austro-Hungarian advance. After the war, Asiago was selected to house one of the largest Italian World War I memorials. Venetian architect Orfeo Rossato designed the monument, using one giant block of locally mined white marble of 80 square meters for the base, with the Roman arch added on top. Sculptors Montini and Zanetti also contributed to the work. The memorial was completed in 1938, with an inauguration ceremony held on 17 July. Benito Mussolini presided over the ceremony, and King Victor Emmanuel III was also present. The memorial is on Leiten Hill a few hundred meters from the center of Asiago. Connecting the memorial with the city center is Via degli Eroi (Road of Heroes), which is lined with large cypress trees.

The exterior consists of the square base, on top of which is a terrace with the arch in the middle and an altar located at the center of the arch. The base's sides are each 80 meters long, and two 35-meter staircases lead up to the terrace. The Roman arch is quadrifrons, meaning four-faced with four arches. With its hilltop location and a height of 47 meters, the arch is visible from throughout the Asiago plateau. This arch, along with the memorials of Pasubio, Cimone, and Monte Grappa, has become a symbol of the province of Vicenza. On the parapet of the terrace there are arrows indicating the names of surrounding mountains and important battle sites. Around the entire memorial are original cannons that have been restored.

The interior contains the crypt and an octagonal chapel in the center. The crypt is therefore beneath the terrace, and its perimetrical and axial corridors intersect to create the central area where the chapel, which includes an altar, is located. Also set in the chapel are the remains of 12 Italian Gold Medals of Military Valor. Along the walls of the corridors are burial niches holding the remains of 33,086 fallen Italian soldiers, whose bodies were exhumed from 35 nearby war cemeteries between 1935 and 1938. The identified remains are in individual burial niches in alphabetical order, and the unidentified remains are in two communal tombs. Of the Italians buried in this memorial, 12,795 are known and 20,291 are unknown. Some years later the remains of 18,505 Austro-Hungarian soldiers, 12,355 of which are unidentified, were also gathered from surrounding war cemeteries and brought to this crypt, such as from the Italian-Austrian cemetery of Val Magnaboschi.

== Museum ==
Near the entrance to the crypt is a museum containing many relics gathered from the battlefields of the Asiago plateau, as well as related documents and photographs from the time period of the war. The museum has a plastic model relief map of the Asiago plateau providing a visual depiction of the events that unfolded there. The left side of the museum focuses on the events of the first two years of the war, 1915–1916, and the right side documents the happenings of 1917–1918. The museum also houses a small cinema hall, and video-documentaries may be viewed there upon request.

A noteworthy piece in the museum's collection is a letter from a young soldier on the eve of the Battle of Mount Ortigara, which was discovered in the 1950s. The author, second lieutenant Adolfo Ferrero, fought in the Alpine battle of Val Dora and was a protagonist of the Battle of Mount Ortigara, where he died in combat. This last letter to his family was found in the personal effects of his page, whose mortal remains were exhumed from Mount Ortigara and entombed in the Asiago War Memorial, where Ferrero's remains are also located. Ferrero's family, therefore, never received the letter, but by a strange twist of fate the letter now directly reaches future generations, as part of a monument to never forget the Great War.

== Visitor Information ==
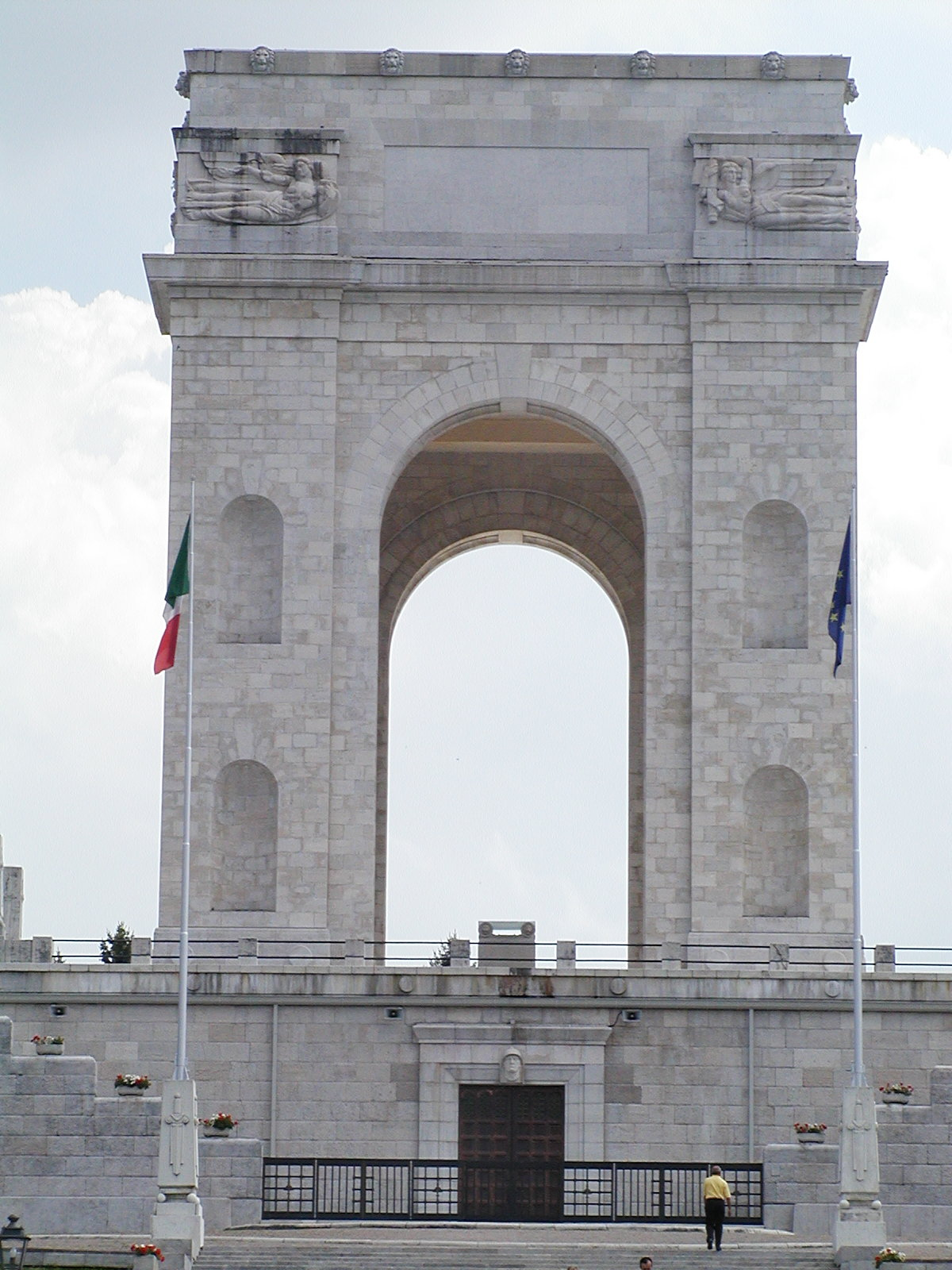
Alpine War 1915-1918 Monument in Asiago

The war memorial and its museum are open to the public every day except on Mondays and the following holidays: New Year's Day, Easter, Easter Monday, May 1, August 15, September 21 (Asiago's patron saint day for St. Matthew), and Christmas. The Winter hours, October 1 to May 15, are 9:00–12:00 and 14:00–17:00. The Summer hours, May 16 to September 30, are 9:00–12:00 and 15:00–18:00.

== See also ==
- Asiago
- Battle of Asiago
- Battle of Mount Ortigara
- Italian Front (World War I)
