= Battles of Asiago Plateau =

Battles of Asiago Plateau may refer either of the following engagements:

- Battle of Mount Ortigara from 10 to 25 June 1917
- Battle of Asiago 15 May 1916
