= Ettore =

Ettore is a given name, the Italian version of Hector.

== People ==
- Ettore Arrigoni degli Oddi (1867–1942), Italian naturalist
- Ettore Bassi (born 1970), Italian actor and television presenter
- Ettore Bastianini (1922–1967), Italian opera singer
- Ettore Bastico (1876–1972), Italian World War II general
- Ettore Boiardi (1897–1985), Italian-born chef famous for his Chef Boyardee brand of food products
- Ettore Bucciero (1938–2025), Italian politician
- Ettore Bugatti (1881–1947), Italian-born French automobile designer and manufacturer
- Ettore Coco (1908–1991), New York City mobster
- Ettore Cordiano (1923–1998), Italian automotive engineer
- Ettore Ewen (born 1986), American professional wrestler performing in the WWE as Big E
- Ettore Fieramosca (1476–1515), Italian condottiero (mercenary leader) and nobleman
- Ettore Guidetti (1974), Italian volleyball coach
- Ettore Mambretti (1868–1962), Italian archaeologist and numismatist
- Ettore Majorana (1906–1938?), Italian theoretical physicist who mysteriously disappeared
- Ettore Mambretti (1859–1948), Italian general
- Ettore Manni (1927–1979), Italian film actor
- Ettore Maserati (1894–1990), Italian automotive engineer
- Ettore Messina (born 1959), Italian basketball coach
- Ettore Milano (1925–2011), Italian racing cyclist
- Ettore Molinari (1867–1926), Italian chemist and anarchist
- Ettore Muti (1902–1943), Italian aviator and Fascist politician
- Ettore Panizza (1875–1967), Argentinian conductor and composer
- Ettore Petrolini (1884–1936), Italian actor and playwright
- Ettore Puricelli (1916–2001), Uruguayan football player and manager
- Ettore Sacchi (1851–1924), Italian lawyer and politician
- Ettore Scola (1931–2016), Italian screenwriter and film director
- Ettore Socci (1846–1905), Italian politician and intellectual of the Risorgimento
- Ettore Sottsass (1917–2007), Italian architect and designer
- Ettore Tito (1859–1941), Italian painter
- Ettore Tolomei (1865–1952), Italian nationalist and fascist
- Ettore Ximenes (1855–1926), Italian sculptor

== Fictional characters ==
- Dottor Ettore Rizzardi, the favorite coroner of the titular character of Donna Leon's Commissario Guido Brunetti crime novels

== See also ==
- Ettorre, a surname
- D'Ettore, a surname
- D'Ettorre, a surname
