= D'Ettore =

D'Ettore is an Italian surname, derived from the given name Ettore. Notable people with the surname include:

- Felice Maurizio D'Ettore (1960–2024), Italian politician
- Gilles d'Ettore (born 1968), French politician
- Giovanni Domenico d'Ettore (1550–1605), Italian Roman Catholic prelate

== See also ==
- Dettore
- D'Ettorre
