= Luca Montuori =

Italian politician

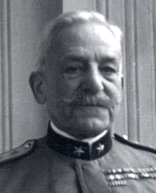
General Montuori

Luca Montuori (Avellino, 18 February 1859 – Genoa, 8 March 1952) was an Italian general during World War I.

== Life ==
Born in Avellino, he attended the Italian Military Academy of Torino. During the outbreak of the Italo-Turkish War, he left for Libia in 1911 and in 1912, he was promoted to Major general. In that function, he commanded the Mixed Brigade during the Battle of Zanzur. His brigade played an important role during this battle and he was rewarded with the Military Order of Savoy.

In World War I, as Lieutenant general, he commanded first the 10th Division and later the 4th Division.
On 23 May 1916, he was placed at the head of the XX Army Corps, with which he fought on the Monte Piana and in the Battle of Mount Ortigara. In August 1917, he led the II Army Corps during the Eleventh Battle of the Isonzo.

After the disastrous Battle of Caporetto, in which he replaced Luigi Capello for a few days as head of the 2nd Army, the new chief of general staff Armando Diaz reorganized the Italian Army completely. Luca Montuori was named commander of the new 6th Army, with which he fought successfully in the Battle of the Piave River (June 1918) and the Battle of Vittorio Veneto (October 1918).

== Later life ==
Montuori became an Army General in 1923 and a member of the Italian Senate in 1928. After the Armistice of Cassibile in September 1943, between Italy and the Allied forces, he remained loyal to the Fascist Italian Social Republic of Mussolini. For this, he was tried after the war and he lost his title of Senator. He died in 1952 at the age of 93.

== Sources ==
- biography on Treccani
- SENATORI DELL'ITALIA FASCISTA
