= Ettorre =

Ettorre is an Italian surname, derived from the given name Ettore. Notable people with the surname include:

- Betsy Ettorre (born 1948), American sociologist
- Jacopo Ettorre (born 1990), Italian lyricist and composer

== See also ==
- D'Ettorre
