= D'Ettorre =

D'Ettorre is an Italian surname, derived from the given name Ettore. Notable people with the surname include:

- Alessandra D'Ettorre (born 1978), Italian racing cyclist
- Roberto D'Ettorre Piazzoli (born 1942), Italian film producer and cinematographer

== See also ==
- D'Ettore
- Ettorre
