= 6th Army (Italy) =

The 6th Army was a field army of the Royal Italian Army which was formed in World War I and World War II.

== World War I ==
The Sixth Army was first formed on 1 December 1916 under command of Ettore Mambretti. This Army was created primarily from the First Army. By August 1916 the First Army had grown from its original composition of two Corps (Corpo d'Armata) to six Corps. Included in its Order of Battle were the XII Corps (under General Zoppi), the XX Corps (under General Montuori) and the XVIII Corps (under General Etna). The first two of these units were given the responsibility for the defense of the Altopiano di Asiago, a high plateau northwest of Vicenza. Because of the assignment to this sector, these two Corps were officially identified as Truppe Altipiani (Highland Troops). The Truppe Altipiani were commanded by General Mambretti. They remained under the control of the First Army until the new Sixth Army was formed, commanded also by Mambretti.

In November 1916 the First Army with Supreme Commander General Cardorna's consent, had planned "Action K", a code name for a counteroffensive targeting Monte Ortigara using General Mambretti's Truppe Altipiani as well as the XVIII Corps. This action was cancelled due to heavy snows.

On December 1, 1916, Mambretti was placed in charge of a new Sixth Army taking his XX Corps (Truppe Altipiani) as well as the XVIII Corps (First Army). Added to these troops was another Corps, the XXII Corps under General Negri di Lamporo.

The Italian Command would later reprise and augment the Action K plan for June 1917. The new Sixth Army under Mambretti was given the responsibility to conduct this operation, having added another Army corps, the XXVI Corps (General Fabbri). The Sixth Army fought the Battle of Mount Ortigara in June 1917. After the failure of this attack, Mambretti was dismissed on 20 July 1917.

What remained of the Sixth Army, now headed by General Donato Etna, was repositioned in Val Sugana in August for defensive purposes. Then, on September 20, 1917, the Sixth Army was disbanded and re-formed into the Highland Troop (Truppe Altipiani) Command. It was again under the command of the First Army. The Truppe Altipiani was commanded by General Zoppi and consisted of the XXVI Corps (Gen. Fabbri), the XXII Corps (Gen. Scotti), the XXV Corps (Gen. Ravazza) and the XX Corps (Gen. Ferrari).

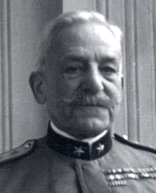
Gen. Luca Montuori

After the disastrous defeat at Caporetto (November 1917) the Italian Army was completely reorganized by Armando Diaz. The Truppe Altipiani Command was dissolved on March 1, 1918, and a new 6th Italian Army was formed under command of Luca Montuori. Initially the newly reconstituted Sixth Army consisted of the XIV Corps Brittanico (British Expeditionary Force) replacing the XXVI Corps Italian, the XII Corps Francese (French Expeditionary Force) replacing the XXV Corps Italian, and the XX Corps Italian. Various other army corps were placed into the Sixth Army over time, including units of the Czechoslovak Legion of Italy. This Army was again placed in the Asiago Plateau between the First and Fourth Armies.

The XIII Corps Italian (under Gen. Sani) was added later. It participated in the successful Battle of the Piave River (June 1918) in the mountain sector (the Second Battle of Tre Monti).

Prior to the also successful Battle of Vittorio Veneto (October–November 1918), the Sixth Army lost both the British Corps, which became part of the new Tenth Army (although the British 48th Division remained), and the French Corps, which became part of the new Twelfth Army. The XII Corps Italian (under Gen. Pennella) was added to the Sixth Army in substitution.

On July 1, 1919, the Sixth Army Command was dissolved.

== World War II ==
The Sixth Army was known in World War II as the Army of the Po, and was charged with the defence of Sicily against the Allies in July–August 1943.

== See also ==
- Italian Expeditionary Force
