= Mount Ortigara =

Mountain in Italy

Coordinates: 46°00′36″N 11°31′19″E

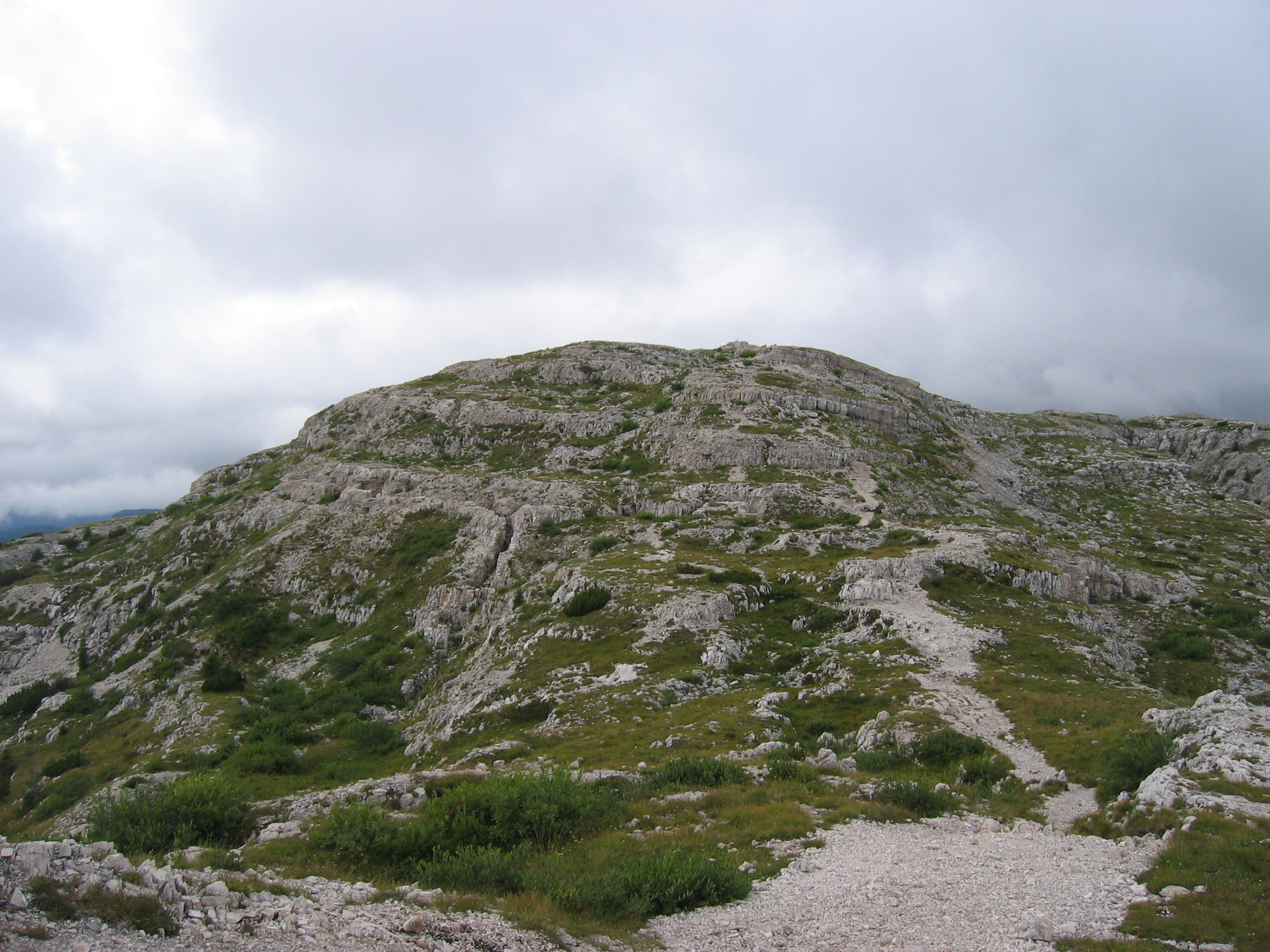
- Summit of Mount Ortigara

Highest point
- Elevation: 2,105 m (6,906 ft)

Geography
- Location: North-east Italy
- Parent range: Vicentine Alps

Climbing
- Easiest route: Through the Asiago Plateau

Mount Ortigara (2,105 m; 6,906 ft) is one of the peaks, about 2,000 m (6,600 ft) tall, which delimit to the north the Seven Municipalities Plateau (in Italian: Altipiano dei Sette Comuni), falling sheer onto the underlying Sugana Valley with a jump of over 1,500 meters (4,900 feet). With the neighbouring mountains, it forms an imposing ridge easily accessible from the Asiago Plateau, but only reachable through steep paths from the Sugana Valley.

In World War I, it became the theatre of fierce fighting (which became known as the Battle of Mount Ortigara) between Italians and Austro-Hungarians, both of whom fell by the thousand trying to conquer its summit.
