= Battle of Mount Ortigara =

1917 WWI Italian front battle

- Part of the Italian Front of the First World War
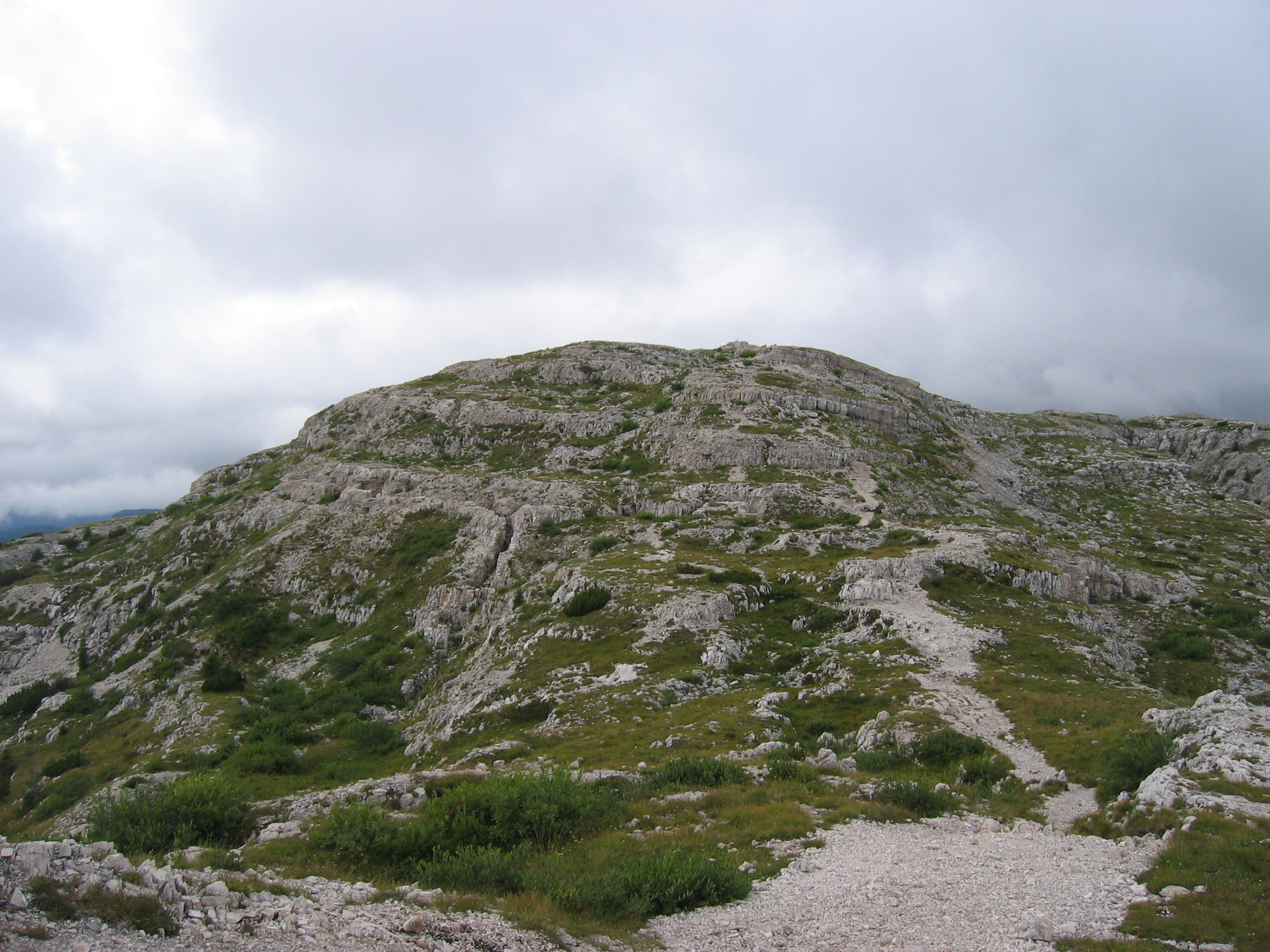
- Mount Ortigara summit
Date	10–25 June 1917
Location	Southern Trentino, present-day Italy 46°00′36″N 11°31′19″E
Result	Austro-Hungarian victory

Belligerents
Italy	Austria-Hungary

Commanders and leaders
(Kingdom of Italy) Luigi Cadorna (Kingdom of Italy) Ettore Mambretti	(Austria-Hungary) Arthur Arz von Straussenburg (Austria-Hungary) Viktor Graf von Scheuchenstuel

Units involved
(Kingdom of Italy) 6th Army	(Austria-Hungary) 11th Army

Strength
300,000; 1,600 guns	100,000; 500 guns

Casualties and losses
23,000 dead or wounded	9,000 dead or wounded
- Location within Italy

The Battle of Mount Ortigara was fought from 10 to 25 June 1917 between the Italian and Austro-Hungarian armies for possession of Mount Ortigara, in the Asiago Plateau.

== Battle ==
The attack began on 10 June and after fierce and bloody fighting, the Italian 52nd Alpine Division managed to capture the top of Mount Ortigara.

The Austro-Hungarian command promptly sent many trained reinforcements. On 25 June, the 11 Italian battalions guarding the summit were attacked by Austro-Hungarian shock troops which retook it, the strenuous Italian resistance notwithstanding.

The 52nd Division alone suffered about half the Italian casualties. General Ettore Mambretti, commander of the Sixth Army, was considered responsible for the heavy casualties and removed from command.

A letter from a young soldier, written on the eve of the battle, is part of the museum of the Asiago War Memorial. Adolfo Ferrero wrote this letter to his family shortly before dying in combat, and the letter was later discovered in the personal effects of his page, whose body was exhumed from Mount Ortigara in the 1950s.

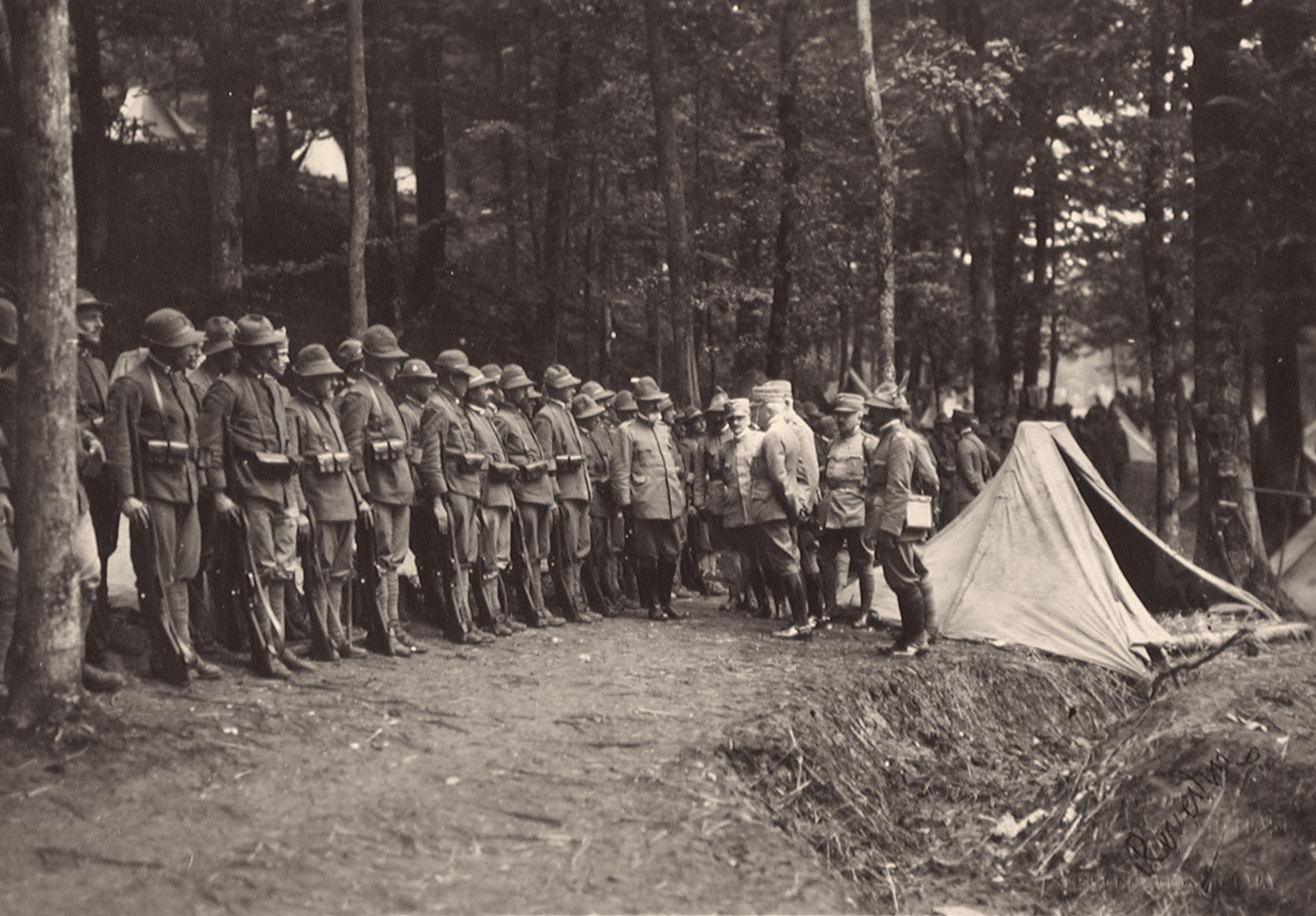
Alpini before the Battle

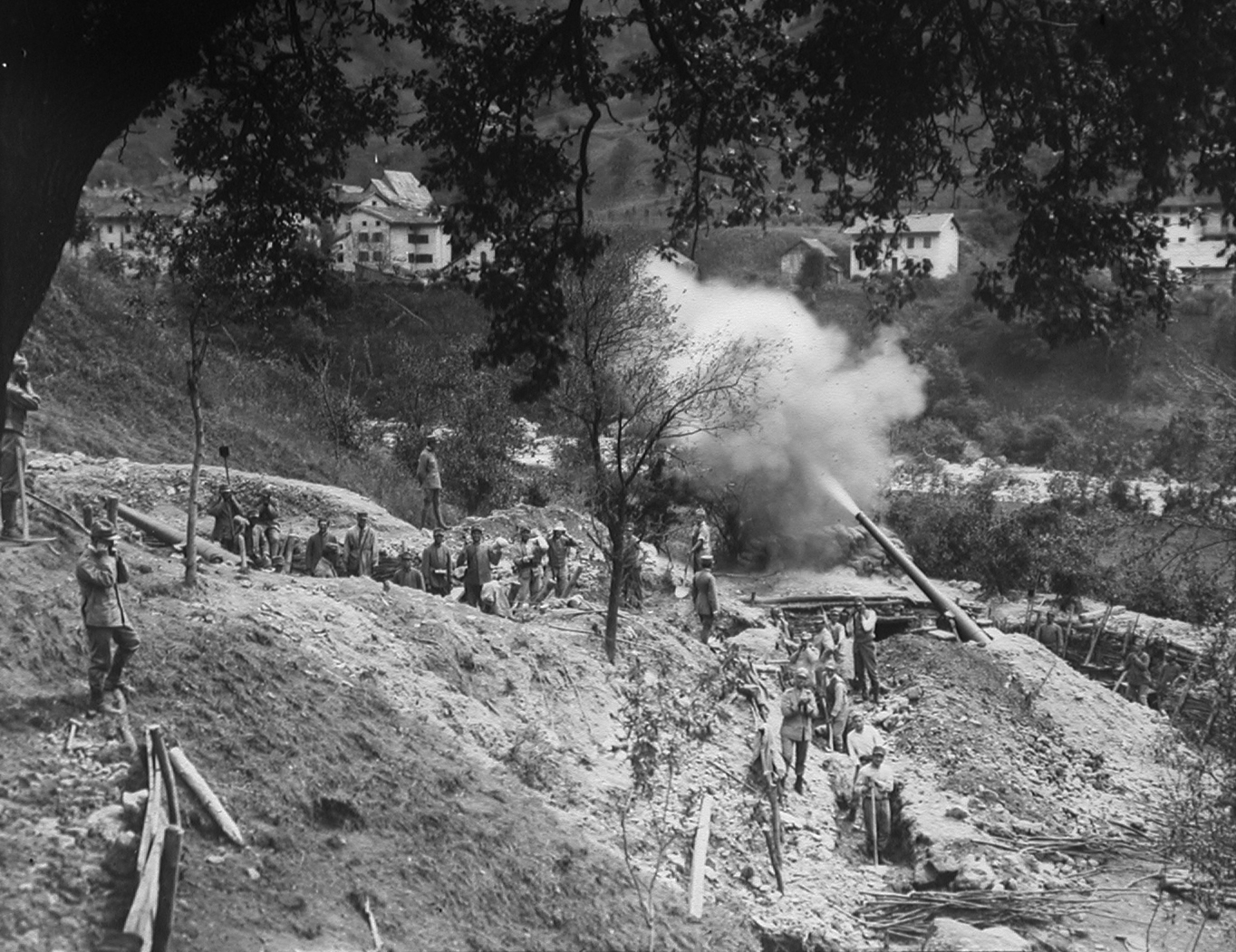
Heavy Italian artillery at work

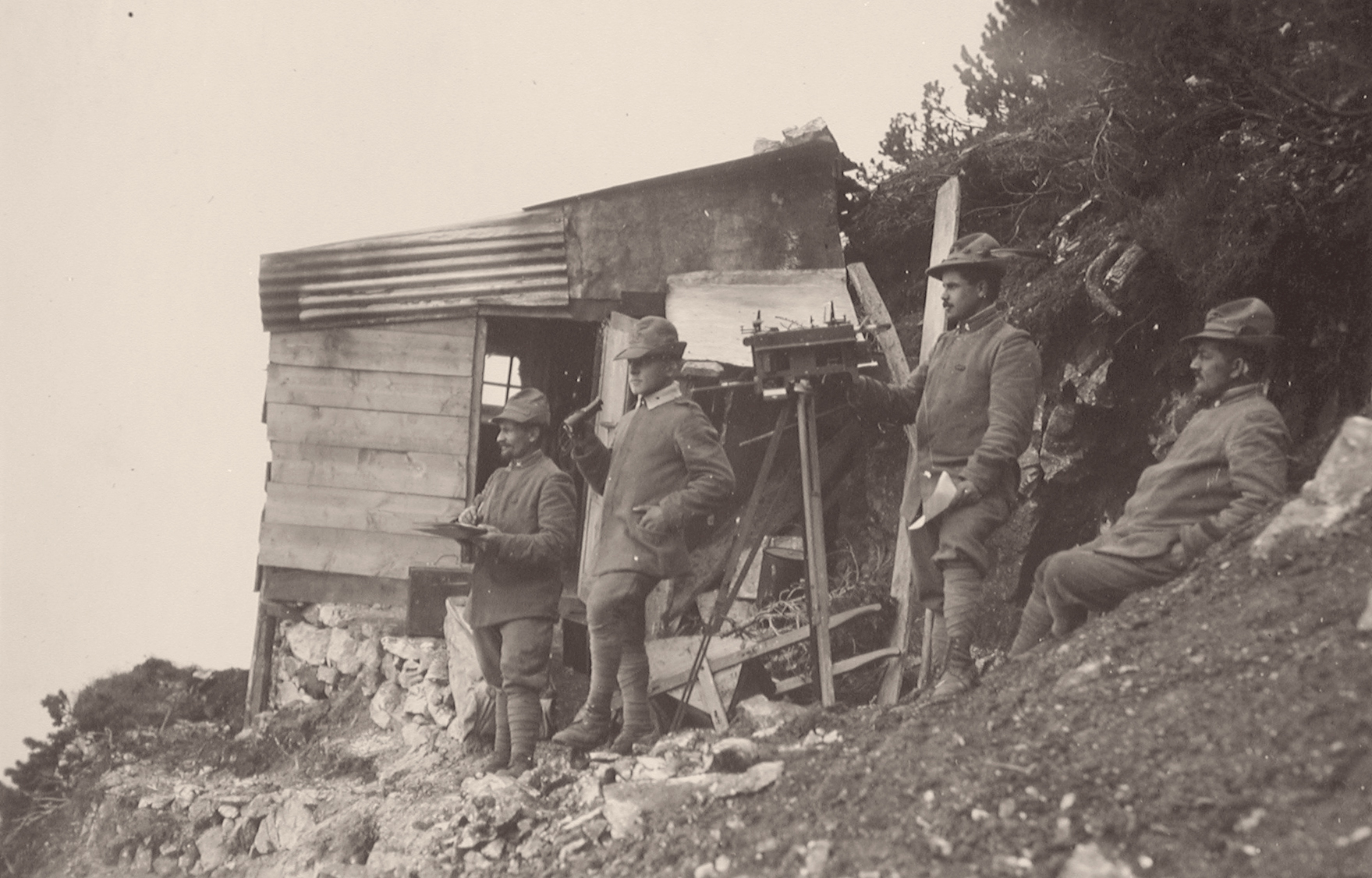
Italian officers at an observation post on Cima Levante
