= Asiago, Veneto =

Township in Veneto, Italy

Asiago Slege
- Comune
- Comune di Asiago
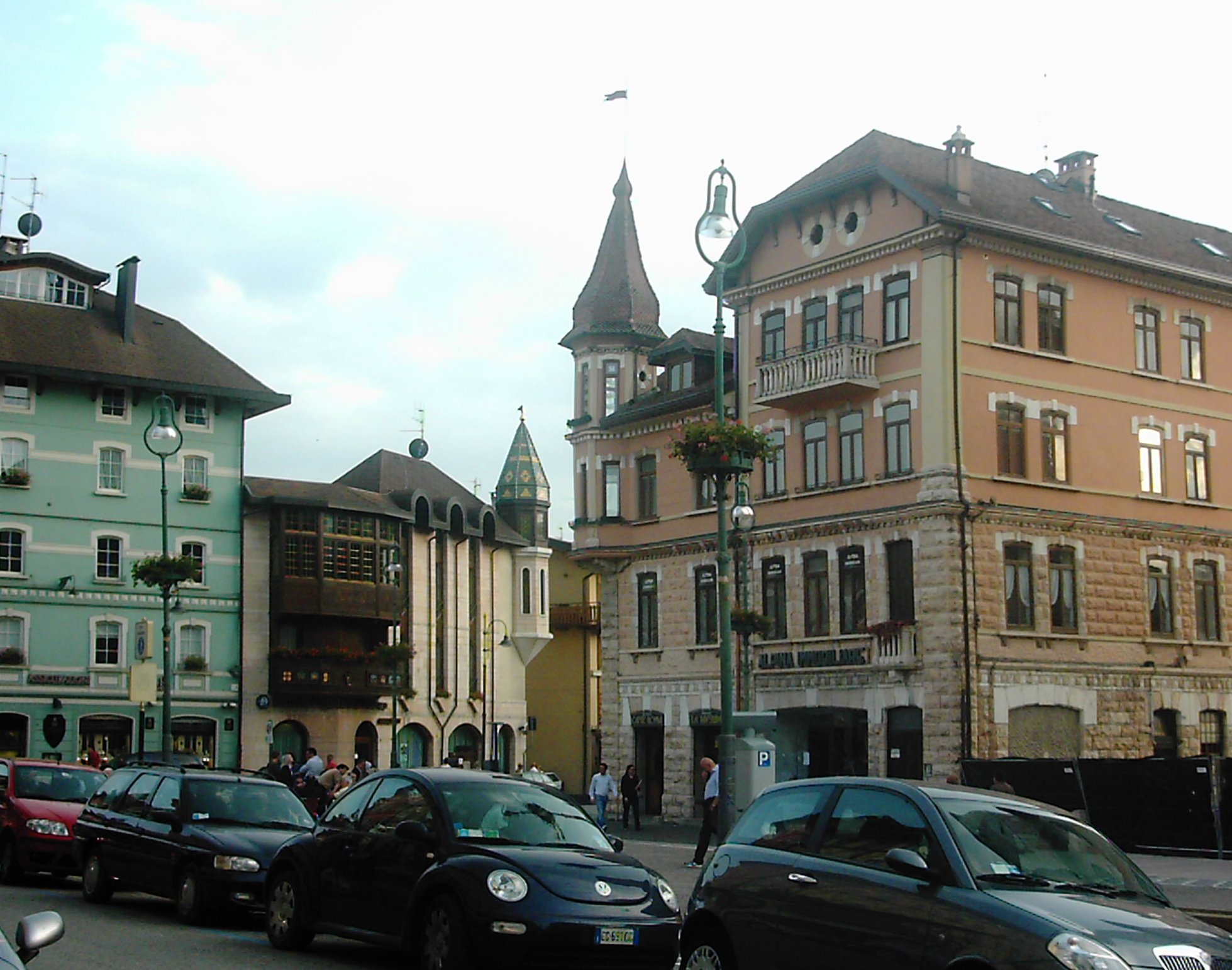
- View of Asiago

- Flag Coat of arms

- Location within Italy Location within Veneto
- Coordinates: 45°52′N 11°31′E
- Country: Italy
- Region: Veneto
- Province: Vicenza (VI)
- Frazioni: Sasso

Government
  - Mayor: Roberto Rigoni Stern

Area
  - Total: 162 km^{2} (63 sq mi)
- Elevation: 1,001 m (3,284 ft)

Population (31 December 2014)
  - Total: 6,462
  - Density: 39.9/km^{2} (103/sq mi)
- Demonym: Asiaghesi/Slegar
- Time zone: UTC+1 (CET)
  - Summer (DST): UTC+2 (CEST)
- Postal code: 36012
- Dialing code: 0424
- Patron saint: St. Matthew
- Saint day: 21 September
- Website: Official website

Asiago (Italian: [aˈzjaːɡo]; Venetian: Axiago, Cimbrian: Slege, German: Schlägen [ˈʃlɛːɡn̩]) is a minor township (population roughly 6,500) with the title of city in the surrounding plateau region (the Altopiano di Asiago or Altopiano dei Sette Comuni, Asiago plateau) in the Province of Vicenza in the Veneto region of Northeastern Italy. It is near the border between the Veneto and Trentino-Alto Adige/Südtirol regions in the foothills of the Alps, approximately equidistant (60 km) from Trento to the west and Vicenza to the south. The Asiago region is the origin of Asiago cheese. The town was the site of a major battle between Austrian and Italian forces on the Alpine Front of World War I. It is a major ski resort destination, and the site of the Astrophysical Observatory of Asiago, operated by the University of Padua.

== Culture ==
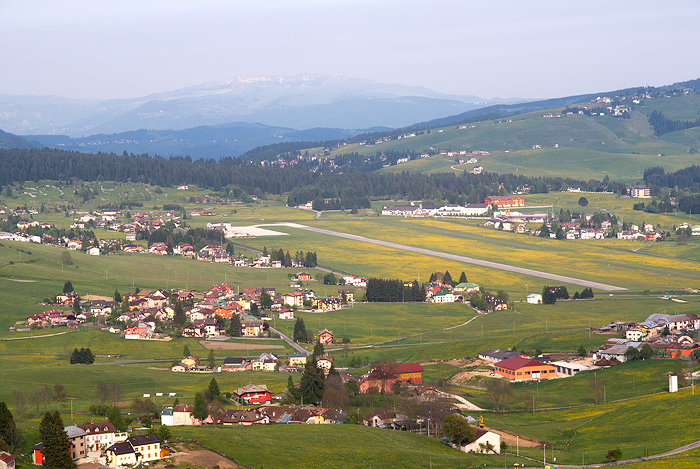
Asiago Airport

Until the middle of the nineteenth century many of the people of Asiago spoke Cimbrian, a German dialect.

Asiago is the birthplace of Italian writer Mario Rigoni Stern, and features prominently in his stories. It is also described in Emilio Lussu's One Year on the High Plateau, Lussu was an officer in the Sassari Brigade, and in his book the author describes the horror and violence of the war.

== Battle of Asiago ==
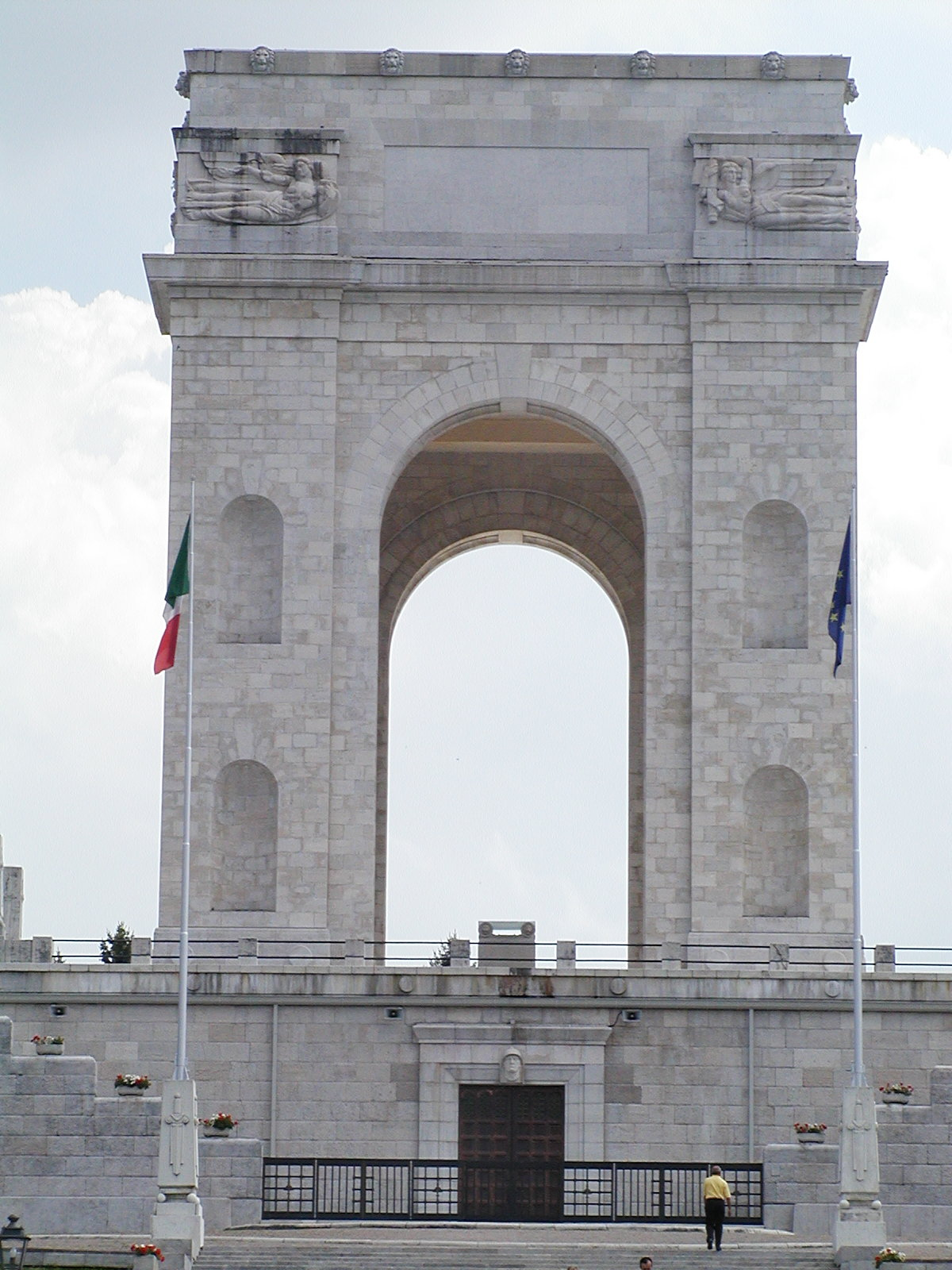
Alpine-War 1915–1918 Monument in Asiago.

The Battle of Asiago (Battle of the Plateaux) was a counter-offensive launched by the Austro-Hungarians on the Italian Front in May 1916, during World War I. It was an unexpected attack that occurred near Asiago (now in northeast Italy, then on the Italian side of the border between the Kingdom of Italy and Austria-Hungary). Commemorating this battle and the fallen soldiers of World War I is the Asiago War Memorial, a monument and museum that is a popular site for visitors to the area.

In a later engagement in 1918, Edward Brittain, brother of Vera Brittain, was killed and was buried in the Granezza British military cemetery on the plateau. In 1970 Vera's ashes were scattered on his grave.

The Barenthal, Boscon, Granezza, Magnaboschi and Cavalletto Military Cemeteries at Asiago were designed by Sir Robert Lorimer in 1920.

== Sport ==
The city is home to HC Asiago, a professional ice hockey team currently playing in the international Alps Hockey League as well as in the Italian top tier Serie A.

The Asiago Vipers, based in Asiago, are a professional inline hockey team. The team plays in the highest Italian inline league.

- Enrico Fabris, long track speed skater who has won three World Cup races.
- Ivan Lunardi, one of the best Italian ski jumpers in history.
- Aldo Stella, ski mountaineer and cross-country skier.
- Lucio Topatigh, Italian ice hockey legend.
- Nicola Tumolero, European champion speed skater.

== Asiago International Award for Philatelic Art ==
Since 1970 the "Circolo Filatelico Numismatico Sette Comuni Asiago" (Numismatic and Philatelic Chapter of the Seven Asiago Communities) has been awarding the prize for the best designed postage stamp of the year. Awards are also given for stamps with the best designs promoting tourism and for raising awareness of environmental issues.

Recent winners:

- 2024 (2 winners) Czech Republic – Block of 4 stamps depicting works of William Shakespeare, and Luxembourg – Melting snowman holding parasol
- 2023 Ukraine – "Russian warship, go...!"
- 2022 San Marino – Two stamps for the 50th anniversary of Doctors Without Borders
- 2021 Switzerland – 3 stamps showing the evolution of cinema theaters and audiences
- 2020 Portugal – Nativity scene with LED light in the North Star
- 2019 Liechtenstein – 3 stamps showing close-ups of birds' eyes

== Sister cities ==
- Noventa Vicentina
- Lockport, Illinois

== See also ==
- Sette Comuni
- Asiago cheese
- Asiago Astrophysical Observatory
- Asiago War Memorial
- Asiago-DRL Asteroid Survey
- Asiago Hockey team
