= Vincenzo Galasso =

Italian economist (born 1967)

Vincenzo Galasso is Professor of economics at Bocconi University focusing on political economics, political economy,

== Early life, education, and professional experience ==
Born in Naples, Galasso read for a Bachelors in economics from Bocconi. He then proceeded to earn a PhD in Economics from UCLA.

Galasso has taught economics at Universidad Carlos III in 1996; at Bocconi since 2002 where he was an associate professor of economics. He briefly assumed professorship at Università della Svizzera Italiana from September 2011 to 2013.

He is the Director of the Analysis in Pension Economics (APE) research unit of Baffi-CAREFIN. He is a co-Editor of the European Journal of Political Economy and an Editor of the Journal of Pension Economics and Finance.

== Academic contributions ==
Galasso has studied the political economy of structural reforms, the political economy of the US Social Security reform.
