= Ettore Mambretti =

Italian general

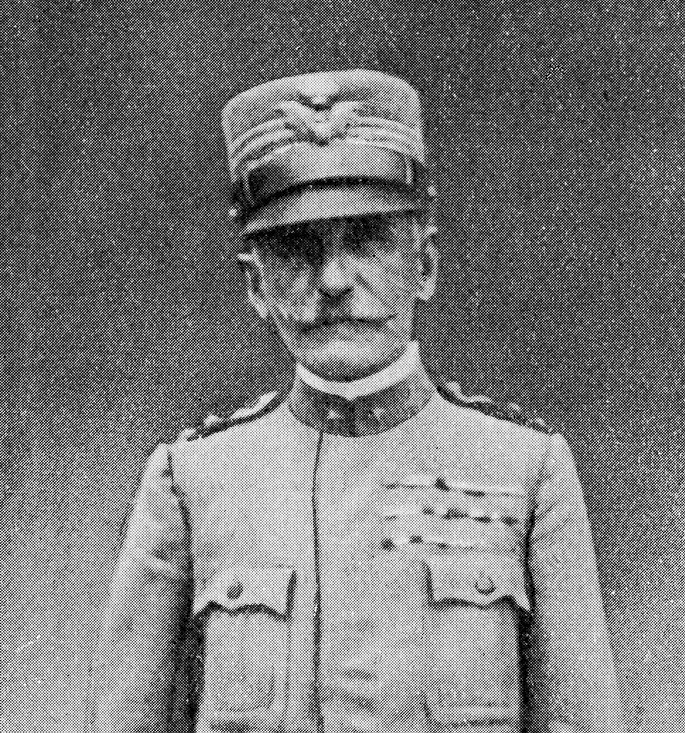

Senator of the Kingdom of Italy
- In office 26 February 1929 – 1931
- Monarch: Victor Emmanuel III
- Prime Minister: Benito Mussolini

Personal details
- Born: 5 January 1859 Binasco, Kingdom of Lombardy–Venetia, Austrian Empire
- Died: 12 November 1948 (aged 89) Rome, Italy

Military service
- Allegiance: Kingdom of Italy
- Branch/service: Royal Italian Army
- Years of service: 1877 – 1931
- Commands: 6th Army
- Battles/wars: First Italo-Ethiopian War: Battle of Adua; Italo-Turkish War: Battle of Sidi Garabaa; World War I: Italian front (World War I); Battle of Mount Ortigara
- Awards: Military Order of Savoy (Knight on 3 January 1916, Commander on 28 December 1916, Grand Officer on 4 March 1921)

Ettore Mambretti (1859–1948) was an Italian general. He commanded the 6th Army during the Battle of Mount Ortigara.

== Biography ==
He attended the Military Academy of Modena, from which he came second lieutenant of the Bersaglieri in 1877. He remained in the Bersaglieri until his appointment as general. He took part in the Battle of Adua, which ended in an Italian defeat. Despite this, he earned the silver medal for Military Valor. Later, in 1912, he was in Libya where, as soon as he arrived, he directed the Battle of Sidi Garabaa, also in an Italian defeat.

Mambretti was a commander general during the First World War, his name is remembered for the Battle of Mount Ortigara, which led to the death of thousands of soldiers and his removal from command, since among other things he had also achieved many defeats in previous clashes. A particular fact, also testified by letters from Angelo Gatti and Luigi Cadorna, was the prejudice that Mambretti was a bringer of bad luck.

In a letter from General Cadorna it read: "The jetting wanted to be practiced to the extreme. The Austrians, after a great preparation of artillery, attacked and took the Ortigara from us, despite a strenuous defense. [...] when the soldiers see Mambretti they do the spells. In Italy, unfortunately, this prejudice constitutes a great opposing force". The defeat suffered on Ortigara and above all the great loss of men despite the abundance of means forced General Cadorna to remove Mambretti from his post.

After World War I, he nevertheless received promotion to army general on 31 December 1923 and in 1929 he was appointed Senator of the Kingdom of Italy, a position for which he himself had applied; in 1931 he was retired by the army. Mambretti died in 1948 in Rome.
