= List of colonial governors of Italian Somaliland =

Governor of Italian Somaliland
- Governatore della Somalia italiana
- Coat of arms of Italian Somaliland
- Longest serving Emilio Dulio; 25 May 1898 – 16 March 1905
- Reports to: King of Italy; Governor-General of Italian East Africa (after 1936)
- Residence: Governor's Palace, Mogadishu
- Formation: 3 August 1889
- First holder: Vincenzo Filonardi
- Final holder: Carlo De Simone (acting)
- Abolished: 9 March 1941
- Succession: British military administrators of Somalia

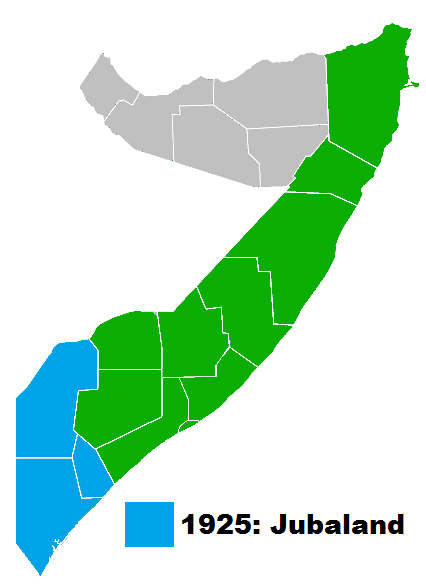
Italian Somaliland (green) and Jubaland/Oltre Giuba (blue) in 1930.

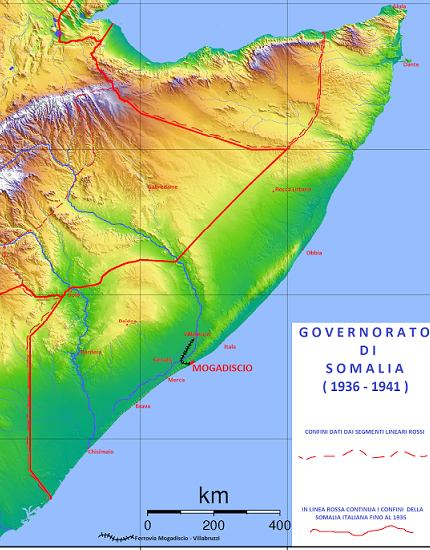
Enlargement and transformation of Italian Somaliland into Somalia Governorate of the Italian East Africa, 1936–1941.

This article lists the colonial governors of Italian Somaliland from 1889 to 1941. They administered the territory on behalf of the Kingdom of Italy.

== Italian Somaliland ==
Complete list of colonial governors of Italian Somaliland:

Tenure (Note: Dates in italics indicate de facto continuation of office.)	Portrait	Incumbent	Notes
Benadir coast Italian protectorate
3 August 1889 to 15 May 1893		Vincenzo Filonardi, Governor	1st time
15 May 1893 to 1896	Vacant		
1896 to 1897		Vincenzo Filonardi, Commissioner	2nd time
1897		Emilio Dulio, Commissioner	1st time
1897 to 25 May 1898		Giorgio Sorrentino, Commissioner	
25 May 1898 to 16 March 1905		Emilio Dulio, Governor	2nd time
Italian Somaliland colony
16 March 1905 to 1906		Luigi Mercatelli, Commissioner-General	
1906 to 1907		Giuseppe Salvago Raggi, Commissioner-General	
1907 to 1908		Tommaso Carletti, Commissioner-General	
1908 to July 1910		Tommaso Carletti, Governor	
Italian Somaliland crown colony
July 1910 to 1916		Giacomo De Martino, Governor	
1916 to 1919		Giovanni Cerrina Feroni, Governor	
1919 to 21 June 1920	Vacant		
21 June 1920 to 8 December 1923		Carlo Ricci Riveri, Governor	
8 December 1923 to 1 June 1928		Cesare Maria De Vecchi, Governor	From 1925 conte di Val Cismon
1 June 1928 to 1 July 1931		Guido Corni, Governor	
1 July 1931 to 6 March 1935		Maurizio Rava, Governor	
6 March 1935 to 22 May 1936		Rodolfo Graziani, Governor	
22 May 1936 to 24 May 1936		Angelo De Ruben, Governor	De facto Governor since January 1936
Somalia Governorate
Part of Italian East Africa
24 May 1936 to 15 December 1937		Ruggiero Santini, Governor	
15 December 1937 to 11 June 1940		Francesco Caroselli, Governor	
11 June 1940 to 31 December 1940		Gustavo Pesenti, acting Governor	
31 December 1940 to 9 March 1941		Carlo De Simone, acting Governor	

Between 1936 and 1941, Italian Somaliland was administered as the Somalia Governorate within Italian East Africa (Africa Orientale Italiana). In 1940, British Somaliland was invaded and annexed to the Somalia Governorate and governed by Carlo De Simone as "interim military governor" until March 1941.

=== British Military Administration/Trust Territory of Somaliland ===
Coat of arms of the Trust Territory of Somaliland

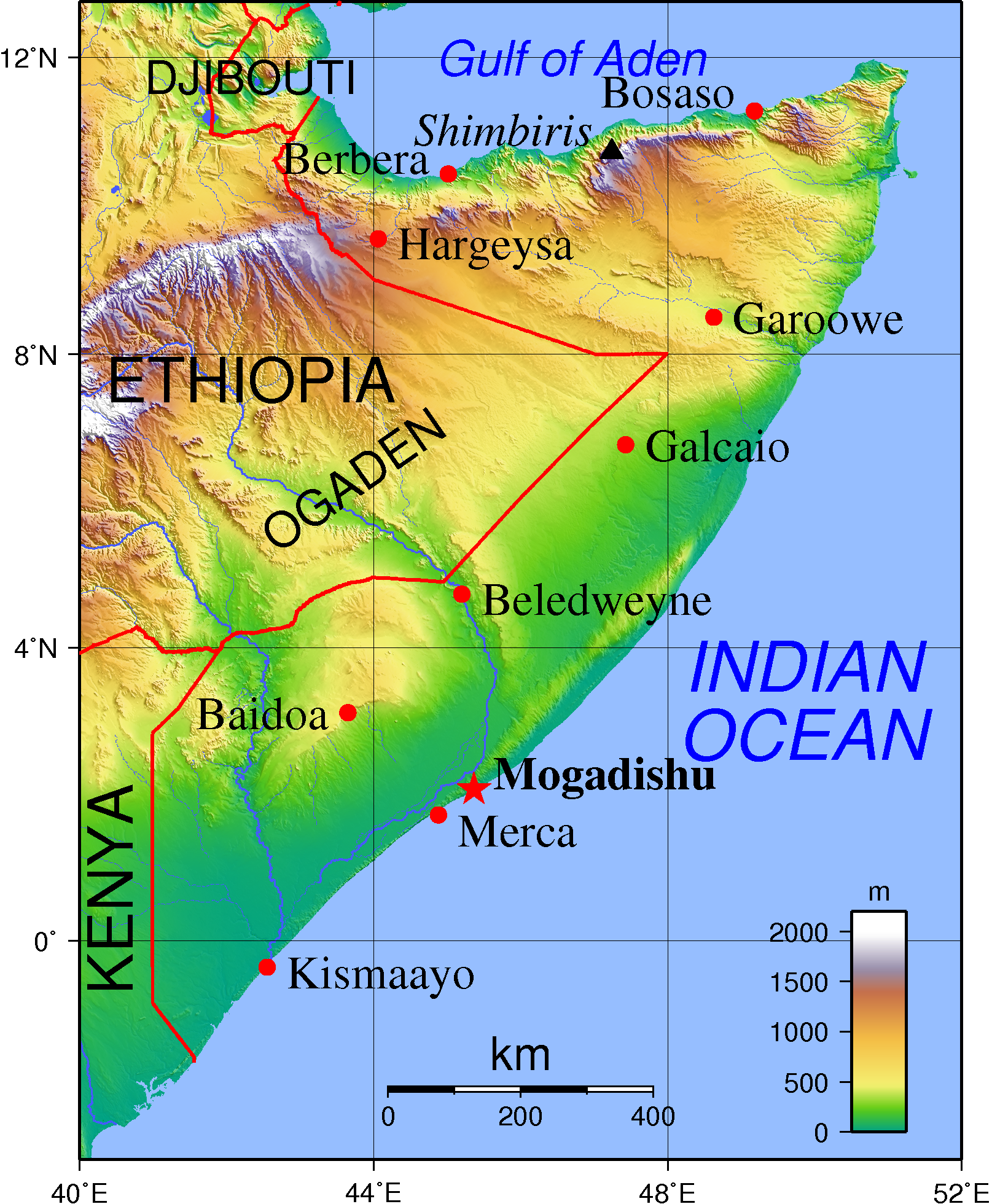
Somalia after independence in 1960, when British Somaliland and the Trust Territory of Somaliland disappeared with their political union

From 1941 until 1950, Italian Somaliland was governed by the British Military Administration. The territory was thereafter administered as the Trust Territory of Somaliland, a United Nations trusteeship with Italian administration. The governors were:

Tenure	Portrait	Incumbent	Notes
British administration of Italian Somaliland
25 February 1941 to 20 March 1941		Alan Cunningham, General Officer Commanding	Military occupation
20 March 1941 to May 1943		William Eric Halstead Scuphan, Chief Administrator	
May 1943 to 1948		Denis Henry Widcham, Chief Administrator	
1948		Eric Armar Vully de Candole, Chief Administrator	
1948 to 1 April 1950		Geoffrey Massey Gamble, Chief Administrator	
Italian Somaliland, Trust Territory of Somalia
Under Italian administration (Amministrazione Fiduciaria Italiana della Somalia, AFIS)
1 April 1950 to 1953		Giovanni Fornari, Administrator	
1953 to 1954	Vacant		
1954 to 1957		Enrico Martino, Administrator	
1957 to 24 July 1958		Enrico Anzilotti, Administrator	
24 July 1958 to 1 July 1960		Mario Di Stefano, Administrator	
1 July 1960	Unification of the Trust Territory of Somalia and the State of Somaliland, establishing the Somali Republic (Somalia).		

For continuation after independence, see: List of presidents of Somalia.

== See also ==
- History of Somalia
- Politics of Somalia
- List of colonial governors of British Somaliland
- President of Somalia
  - List of presidents of Somalia
- List of prime ministers of Somalia
- Italian Somaliland
  - Somalia Governorate

== Bibliography ==
- Antonicelli, Franco. Trent'anni di storia italiana 1915 – 1945. Ed. Mondadori. Torino, 1961.
- Calchi Novati, Gian Paolo. L'Africa d'Italia Editori Carrocci. Roma, 2011.
