= Slavery in Somalia =

Slavery in Somalia (Note: including Somaliland) existed as a part of the Indian Ocean and Red Sea slave trades. Habesha and Oromo peoples were enslaved and sold to foreign traders from the Middle-East and beyond, while those retained in Somalia were commonly kept as domestic servants and concubines. Enslaved women and children formed a significantly higher share than men. Ethiopian Christians were among the most popular enslaved people traded by Somali merchants. Later in the 19th century, to meet the demand for menial labor, Bantu slaves began to be exported from Zanzibar and were sold in large numbers to Somali customers. In Somali society, slaves were viewed as a source of wealth and a mark of status. According to Harold Nelson, slaves constituted the most important commodity in Somali trading networks. Somalis kept slaves for agricultural labor and herding as well as concubinage.

== History ==
=== Antiquity ===
The Land of Punt maintained long-standing trade relations with Ancient Egypt in which a variety of goods were exchanged, including enslaved people. Pharaoh Djedkare is known to have kept a Congoid (pygmy) slave acquired through Punt at his court for entertainment, the young Pharaoh Pepi II was likewise intrigued by another Congoid slave procured through Punt.

During the Classical period, slaves described by Roman merchants as being of 'better quality' were exported from the Somali ports of Opone and Malao to India and Roman Egypt. James MacNabb Campbell believed these higher quality slaves to have been Abyssinian. Pirates from Barbaria also reportedly launched raids on Adulis according to the Periplus.

As attested by an anonymous Greek 1st century writer:

"Besides aromatics, slaves of a superior description are exported from Opone, which are brought to Egypt in increasing numbers."

Many scholars have suggested the name of the city-state Opone to be derived from the ancient Egyptian term Pwene, referring to the Land of Punt, which exported both frankincense and enslaved people.

=== Early Medieval slave trade in northern Somalia ===
During the medieval period, the Somali port of Zeila was the site of an important slave market where traders from Arabia purchased Abyssinian slaves who were then transported to Yemen and the Hejaz to serve as domestic slaves, concubines, and soldiers in local military and naval forces. Al-Idrisi is the earliest author to mention the slave trade, noting that slaves constituted one of the most important exports of the Somali port of Zeila. Ibn Sa'id al-Maghribi and Ibn Fadlallah al-Umari state that slaves captured in Abyssinia were taken to a town called Washilu which was located near Ganz in the Ifat Sultanate where they were prepared for export. The male captives were rendered eunuchs and then sent to Hadiya for medical treatment, after which they were transported to the Somali port of Zeila. According to al-Idrisi, slaves exported from Zeila were then taken to a major slave depot in Zabid. The city, according to the modern Yemeni historian Huseyn al-Amri, had for many centuries a large population of Abyssinian slaves.

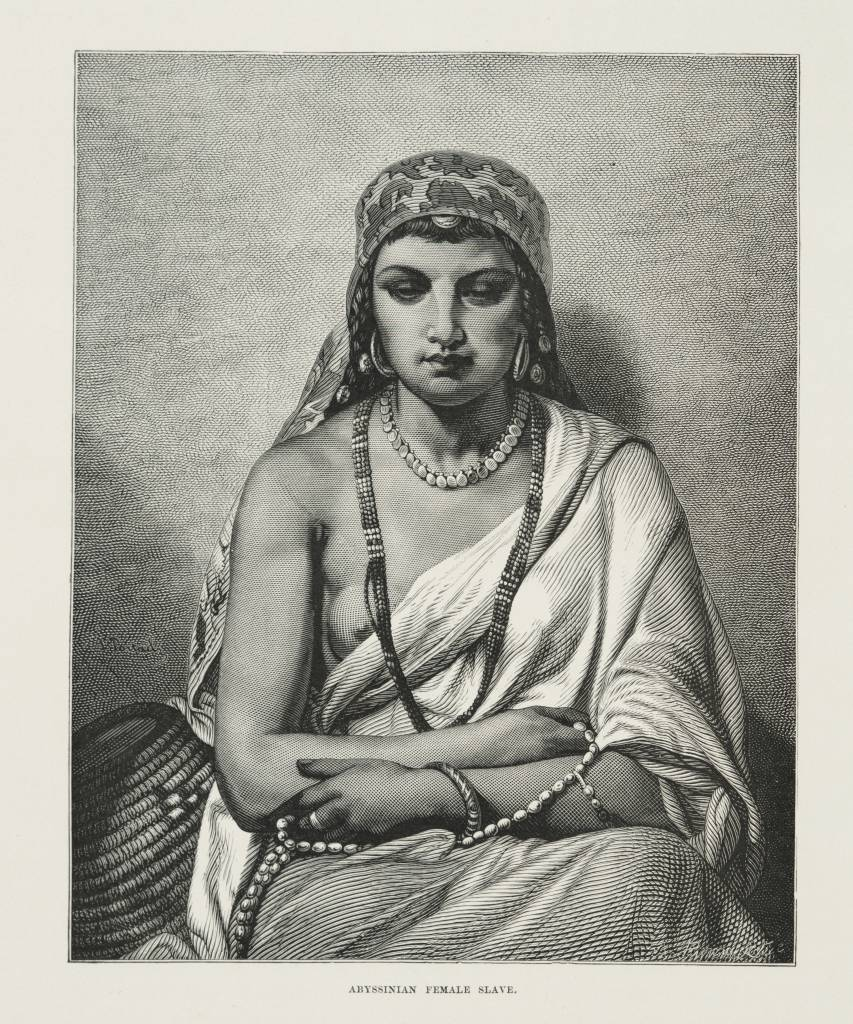
Illustration of an Abyssinian female slave.

A Yemeni chronicle compiled in the 13th century indicates that Zeila served as an important transit point in the slave trade between the Horn of Africa and Arabia. According to the chronicle, enslaved people passed through Zeila before being exported to Aden, with merchants required to pay a duty of two or three dinars per slave for transport by ship. While the overland transportation of slaves from the Ethiopian interior to the port of Zeila amounted to 36 dirhams or 9 dinars. The available written evidence suggests that the overland trade and transport of slaves to Zeila was primarily conducted by African rather than Arab merchants. The treatise names Zeila as an export point for Ethiopian slaves, with Amhara and Tigrayan slave boys and girls sold for 20 uqiyyah of silver. Another anonymous Yemeni chronicle as well as the contemporary writer al-Khazraji mention Habashi eunuchs and slave girls being unloaded in Yemen from Zeila

Ibn Sa'id described Zeila as the "emporium of Habash". Yemeni Rasulid sources in the same period mention that most of these Abyssinian slaves brought to Yemen from Zeila were Jazli, Amhara and Saharti (Tigrayans). Habesha slaves were priced at roughly twice the value of Zanji slaves. Habesha slaves often rose to positions of power in Yemen. The Jazli seized power from the Ziyadids and established the Najahid dynasty, Faraj al-Saharti and Surur al-Amhari ruled successively as Wazirs of Zabid between 1133 and 1157 and other Habeshas participated in the state as military leaders such as Ishaq bin Marzuq al-Saharti.

Some of the children of Sheikh Isaaq bin Ahmad, the 13th century founder of the Isaaq clan, were reportedly born in the Somali country to a Habesha woman, described as a servant. The descendants of Sheikh Isaaq's Abyssinian wife form the Habr Habusheed confederation, comprising the Habr Je’lo, Ibran, and Sanbur clans. Some of the descendants of Sheikh Ahmed Hawiye in southern Somalia also trace descent from an Ethiopian woman, namely the Gurgate, Gugundhabe, and Jambelle clans. During the Medieval period, the slave trade proved to be a significant factor in the Islamization of the coastal plains by maintaining links with the Arab world while supporting major trading centres such as Zeila and Mogadishu, along with their Somali hinterlands.

According to the Ethiopian historian Tadesse Tamrat, Ethiopian slaves sold at Zeila originated from the non-Muslim regions of Ethiopia, namely the Tigray and Amhara regions. He notes that the revival of Christian political power in Ethiopia during the 14th century reduced the export of Christian captives into Arabia, though instances of Habesha Christians being taken into slavery continued to be recorded afterward. This trade of Christian slaves at Zeila persisted well into the nineteenth century, as they were preferred in Muslim markets over their neighboring "pagan" counterparts.

Besides Ethiopian slaves, slaves from bilad al-Zanj were also exported from Zeila during this period. In Yemen, Zanji slaves from Zeila were taxed a little more than those from Ethiopia (2.25 dinars). Also mentioned in the sources is an additional category of Zanji slaves labelled uluj exported from Zeila, which most likely designated particularly strong male slaves.

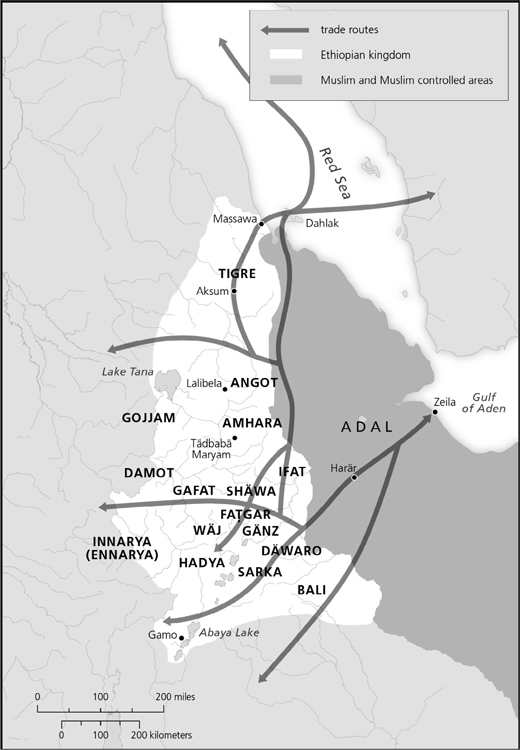
Historical routes of the Ethiopian slave trade.

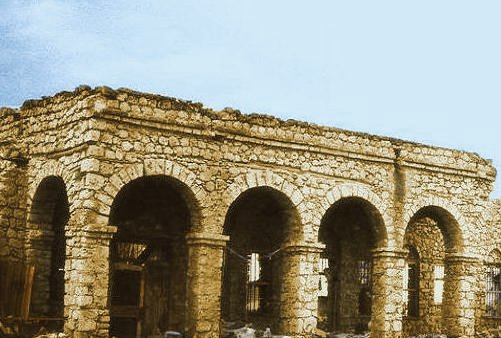
Pre-colonial ruins at Zeila

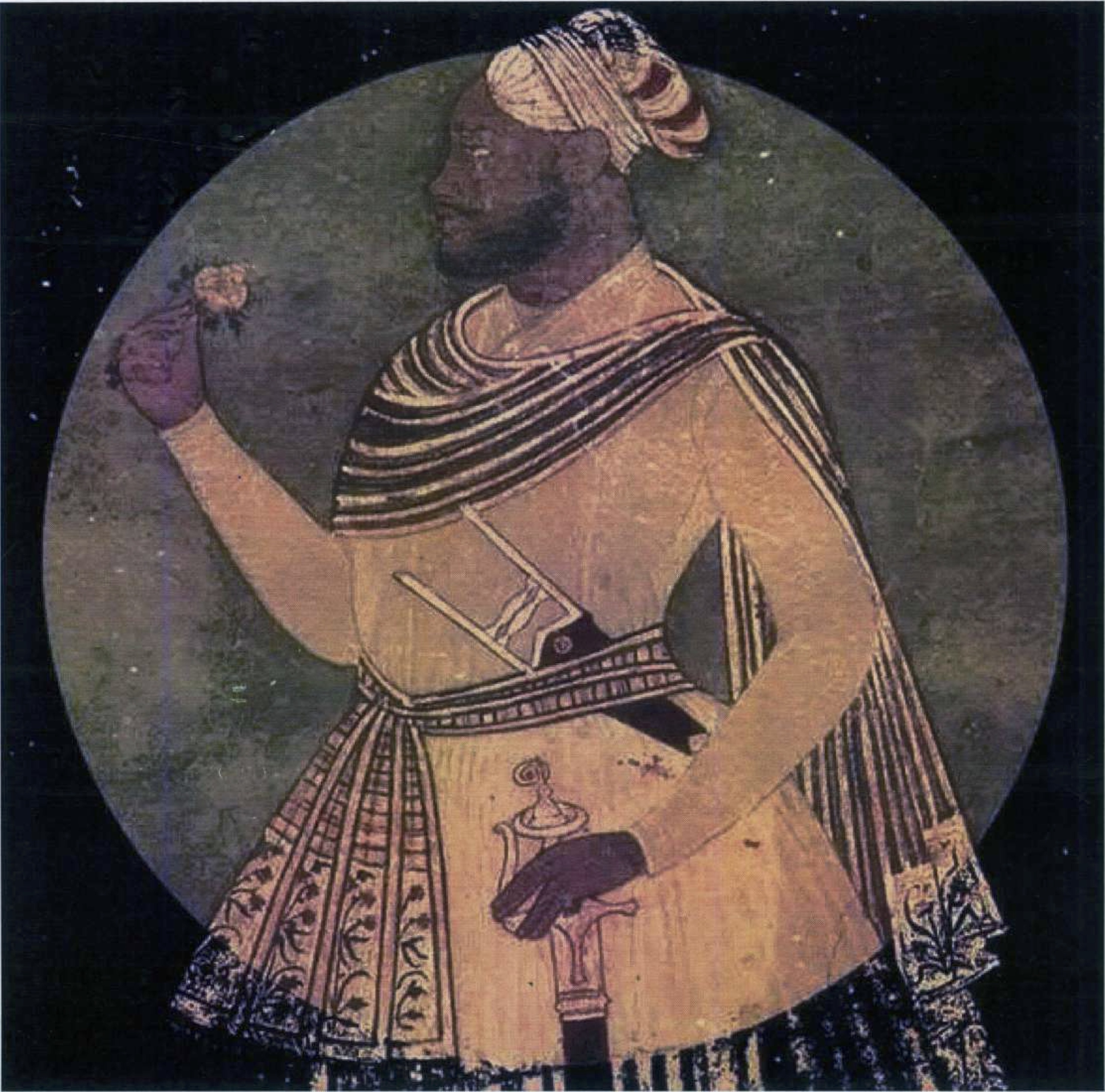
Malik Ambar, an enslaved Ethiopian born in Harar, who later rose to become Prime Minister in Ahmadnagar Sultanate (present-day India).

=== Christian-Muslim wars ===
In 1376, the Sultan Haqq al-Din II of the Walashma dynasty started a holy war against the Christian Solomonid dynasty. He was ceaselessly engaged in conflict with the Solomonid king, from whom he took many captives. According to al-Maqrizi, his successor Sultan Sa'd al-Din raised bigger armies, increased the amount of raids into the Christian kingdom and captured many spoils. The Sultan led incursions as far as Hadiya which he plundered.

Raids continued during the Bar Sa'd al-Din. In the 1420s, an emir serving under the Sultan Jamal al-Din II had captured such a large amount of Ethiopian captives that slaves became highly abundant in the Muslim kingdom, Abyssinian slave-girls were reportedly sold for the value of a ring. Each Fakir was also given three slaves.

According to Maqrizi:

"The great conquests of Jamal al-Din are magnified, and his great battles are numerous, and his deeds, spoils, captives, those he killed, and those he took captive are many.. He killed and captured countless of the Amhara, until the lands of India, Yemen, Hormuz, the Hijaz, Egypt, the Levant, Rome, Iraq, and Persia were filled with the Abyssinian slaves he had captured in his conquests."

His successor, Sultan Badlay, followed in his footsteps and launched multiple military expeditions into the Ethiopian kingdom. According to Richard Pankhurst, he brought numerous Christian lands under his rule, and burnt at least six churches. He killed many Christian leaders, and made their subjects captive. The Sultan soon grew immensely wealthy, accumulating gold, silver, fine garments, armour, and a large number of slaves. According to Magdalena M. Kloss, the Barr Sa'd al-Din, also known as the Adal sultanate, dominated the slave trade in the Horn of Africa during the 15th and 16th centuries through its port of Zeila. Ethiopian Christian hagiographies suggest that most individuals sold into slavery abroad during that period were made captive through raids in the border regions between the Christian kingdom.

In the second half of the 15th century, the Emir Mahfuz of Zeila launched annual incursions into the Christian kingdom during Lent, killing the men and taking women and children captive.

According to René Basset, Mahfuz's incursions reached as far as the Dukem river near Addis Ababa. Francisco Alvarez states that Mahfuz targeted the regions of Shewa, Amhara, and Fatagar in his raids. On one occasion, Mahfuz reportedly carried off 19,000 slaves, whom he sent as gifts to his friends and supporters in Arabia. According to Francisco Alvares, Mahfuz carried out over twenty annual forays into the Christian interior, in the course of which he captured innumerable slaves. The Ottoman admiral Salman Reis also mentioned these annual raids into Abyssinia. Sihab al-Din Ahmed notes that every Emir of the Barr Sa'd al-Din had the right to raise a small army and lead a raiding party into Abyssinia. Christian slaves captured by Mahfuz were converted to Islam after being sold in Arabia. Abyssinian slaves were regarded by Arabs as more loyal and more skillful than other enslaved peoples. Ludovico di Varthema, who visited Zeila in 1503, was surprised by the “very great” number of slaves sold there, noting that they were Ethiopians who had been captured in war, and were mainly shipped to Mecca, Yemen, Persia, Cairo, and India. From the early 16th century onward, there is continuous evidence of “Habashi” Abyssinian servants in middle and upper-class Iranian households.

Through Zeila, and to a lesser degree Berbera, passed the main stream of slaves from the Ethiopian hinterland. During the 15th and 16th centuries, the port of Zeila on the Somali coast was the largest slave market in the Horn of Africa, where merchants from Arabia acquired slaves. Clifford Pereira states that the majority of “Habshi” slaves arriving in India during the 16th century came through the port of Zeila, the principal exporter of enslaved Ethiopians, he further notes that the oldest route by which enslaved Africans reached East Asia ran from Zeila to Oman and Hormuz, where slaves were picked up by Gujarati or Persian vessels.

According to Amelie Chekroun, raids carried out into the neighboring Christian kingdom enabled forces based in the Bar Saʿd al-Din to seize livestock and slaves, while also serving as a reminder to Muslim populations of the persistent threat posed by renewed hostilities. These expeditions combined economic motives with a strategic function.

The military leader Imam Ahmed bin Ibrahim was raised by a slave owned by his family which he later freed. In 1525, Imam Ahmed started his invasion of Ethiopia with a Somali army. At the Battle of Shimbra Kure the Ethiopian forces were decisively defeated, opening the way for Imam Ahmed to conquer Ethiopia, Imam Ahmed and his forces were able to penetrate the heartland of the Christian state in Northern Shewa, Amhara, and Tigray. In some of his campaigns, his soldiers possessed so many slaves that he was forced to order their abandonment, as they were slowing his army down. In one raid in 1528, Imam Ahmed is recorded to have taken approximately 2,500 captives, with 500 enslaved captives allotted to him as his share of the loot. Christian slaves captured by Imam Ahmed's troops were mainly sold to the Ottoman world. Enslaved women sold from Zeila to the Ottomans were primarily destined for the harems of Istanbul and Damascus, while men were employed as eunuchs, agricultural laborers, textile workers, or military slaves. The trade was also a lucrative source of revenue for Ottoman officials, as an additional tax known as the Sera-i zenciye was levied on enslaved individuals of African descent.

Among Imam Ahmad's captives was the wife of a defeated Christian commander. Renamed Hajirah, she became his concubine and later gave birth to one of his sons, while her captured husband was sent as a gift to the governor of Aden. On another occasion, the wife of another defeated Ethiopian commander was taken as a concubine by one of Imam Ahmad's generals. Besides ordinary captives, several high-ranking noblemen and women were also taken prisoner and sold into slavery. Among them was the future king Minas and his cousins, who were sold into slavery in 1542 before being ransomed from Arabia and returned to Ethiopia several years later. According to the scholar Habtamu Mengistie Tegegne, this illustrates that practically everyone in the Christian kingdom faced the possibility of enslavement.

An innumerable number of slaves were captured during the campaigns of Ahmad ibn Ibrahim al-Ghazi, leading to a vast, though incalculable, increase in the number of Habesha slaves arriving in the Indian subcontinent. João de Castro wrote that Ethiopian slaves serving as soldiers in India were held in high regard to such a degree that there was a proverb throughout India that good soldiers or servants had to be Abyssinian. He added that they were so highly regarded in Bengal, Cambay, Balagate, and other parts of India that those who commanded armies or held high rank were all drawn from among them. The war was considered a major reason for the importation of Ethiopian slaves into India during the sixteenth century. Abyssinians of slave origin played a major role in the politics of Mughal India, where they were called Habshis. One such figure was Malik Ambar, an Ethiopian slave brought to serve at the Nizam Shahi court in Ahmadnagar. He rose to become a senior military commander and installed a new ruler on the throne. Supported by other Ethiopian slave soldiers and administrators, Malik Ambar remained the dominant political figure in the kingdom for the rest of his life. Between the 15h and 17th centuries, large numbers of Ethiopian slaves were imported into India to serve as soldiers in the Muslim kingdoms of the Deccan plateau, where some rose to become part of the ruling elite in states such as Bijapur.

Imam Ahmed is recorded saying to his troops:

"If you encounter enemies, fight them, seize their wealth, enslave their women, and kill the men"

Leo Africanus writes in the early 16th century that Muslims from the Barr Sa'd al-Din waged war against the Christian Abyssinians, capturing many slaves and sending them to the Ottomans and other rulers in Arabia. According to Pedro Paez, Imam Ahmed's successor, Emir Nur ibn Mujahid, was reported to have made many captives after his win against Gelawdewos at the Battle of Fatagar.

Most enslaved African women in Arabia were employed as domestic servants. Affluent Arabs showed a particular preference for Habshi concubines, a preference attributed to contemporary perceptions of their attractiveness and the linguistic ties between Habshi women and the Habshi eunuchs who guarded them. Young Ethiopian female slaves were in high demand in the markets of the Muslim world, but the supply of young Ethiopian males was even more important to the Arabian rulers, whose power depended on private armies composed largely of Ethiopian slaves. The Tahirid Sultans of Yemen had 300 Abyssinian slave bodyguards, all captured from Abyssinia at the age of eight or nine, and trained to be soldiers. In the early 17th century, Pedro Paez notes that the invading Oromos captured Amharas from as far as Gojjam and sold them to the Imamate of Awsa. Slaves pens built of stone were found by archeologists in the Medieval town of Amud in Awdal.

=== Medieval slave-trade in southern Somalia ===
According to the 13th-century treatise Nur al-Ma'arif, ships from Mogadishu sailed annually to ports in southern Arabia to sell Zanj slaves and other commodities. Customs tariffs from Shihr specifically record male and female slaves from Mogadishu among the goods unloaded there. In 14th century Mogadishu, the Muslim traveler Ibn Battuta was served by a eunuch belonging to the ruler of the city. According to the scholar Joseph Harris, Chinese trade with medieval Mogadishu during the Ming dynasty could have included supplies of slaves. Chinese Ming dynasty records from 1423 mention the Sultan of Mogadishu having multiple concubines. The 15th-century administrative treatise Mulakhas al-Fitan notes that slaves arriving in Aden on merchant ships from Mogadishu were taxed by two and a half dinars. The historian Magdalena M. Kloss notes that Mogadishu was a major export center of Zanji slaves, functioning as an entrepot for enslaved people brought from the African interior and regions farther south. According to the 15th century Chinese writer Fei Xin, Banadir cities such as Barawa and Juba had houses that were three to four stories high with slaves living on the ground floor while their masters and guests occupied the upper floors.

A manuscript recovered by Enrico Cerulli records a woman from Mogadishu freeing her slave in 1573. The manumission deed of the slave bears the signatures of a Khatib and a Faqih. Joao de Santos (1609) writes that slave merchants from Mogadishu had a custom of sewing up the genitals of young female slaves to prevent conception, as it increased their value both for their chastity and for the greater confidence buyers placed in them. Slaves were used in Mogadishu by wealthy families, especially for housework and weaving.

Merchants from Barawa and Mogadishu reportedly imported 3000 slaves a year from the island of Madagascar. As noted by the French historian Thomas Vernet, Portuguese accounts document merchants from Barawa and Mogadishu traveling to Madagascar to acquire Malagasy slaves. This slave-trade is documented by Portuguese chroniclers as early as 1506. Slaves from Madagascar were also sent to the Comoros islands where they were collected for shipment to Mogadishu. After the appearance of the Ottomans on the Eritrean coast in the 16th century and the establishment of the Habesh Eyalet, the slave trade in the Horn of Africa intensified, especially in southern Somalia. Historian Jeremy Black writes that slaves imported into Mogadishu from Madagascar would be re-exported to India.

=== Oromo slave trade ===
According to Indira Rosenthal, between the 16th and 19th centuries, Somali merchants specialized in trading enslaved Oromo girls from Ethiopia and Kenya, who were sold as concubines. Thomas Vernet writes that captured Oromo women were sold in Somalia as early as the 17th century. In the 19th century, Somalis raided Oromo settlements, killing most men and taking women and children as slaves. The captives were incorporated into household life while remaining subjects. Oromo women, valued for their beauty, were kept as concubines, used as domestic servants, or married to other slaves.

People who had been captured in raids could become slaves in both the northern and the southern parts of Somalia. Somali pastoralists in southern Somalia had control over a substantial numbers of pastoral slaves by the turn of the century. These slaves were primarily, if not entirely of Oromo origin. In 1908, the Italian Giacinto Vicinanza noted that the slaves in Somalia were of two sorts: Oromo and Swahilis. According to the scholar Catherine Besteman, the Somalis dominated in warfare during the 19th century, conquering and enslaving the Oromo, the Oromo also constituted the principal source of slaves in Somalia. As Marguerite Ylvisaker has remarked, southern Somalis preferred to sell Oromo and “Abyssinian” slaves captured in raids at Lamu, replacing them with Bantu slaves from the south, who, being farther from their homelands, were considered less likely to escape.

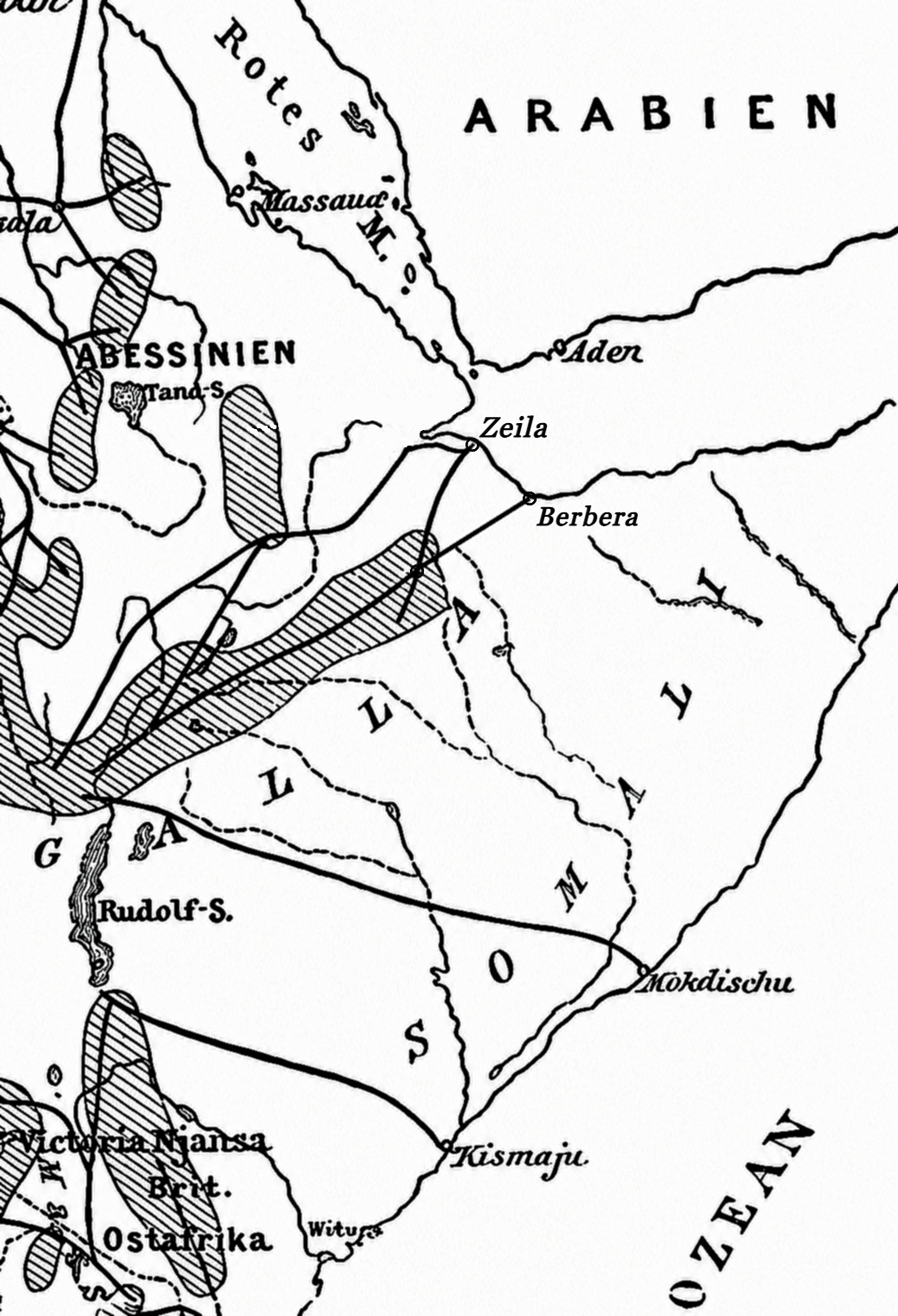
Slave routes in the Somalia peninsula, 1890.

By the mid-1860s, a smallpox epidemic weakened Oromo tribes in the Juba-Tana area, after which Darod and Ajuran Somali clans expanded into Oromo territories through sustained conflict, leading to the seizure of land and livestock and the enslavement of most Oromos in the region. Somali raids on the Tana river Oromos reached a peak in the 1870s. By the 1870s, the steadily increasing number of Oromo slaves from present-day Kenya was estimated at 10,000 annually crossing the Juba River into the Kismayo area. Those who carried out slave raids and those who traded in slaves were often distinct, belonging to different Somali clans. Contemporary accounts described Somali slave raiders as particularly feared, with reports that even rumors of their approach could prompt entire villages to flee or attempt negotiations with Somali elders. In at least one case, town gates were deliberately reinforced in response to the threat of such raids. There were also reports of Somali attacks on entire settlements to obtain captives. In the 19th century, the Orma Oromo tribe living in Kenya was conquered and enslaved by the Somali, the captured Oromo women were kept as concubines and the children as household slaves. Likewise, the Wardey Oromo tribe were defeated and sold into slavery at Lamu and Zanzibar by the Ogaden Somalis. The numerous women captured from the Oromo were absorbed into Somali groups, creating a mixed population. Through raids rather than bartering, Oromo slaves were acquired by the Ogaden and Kablalla Somalis living north of Kismayo. According to the colonial administrator Charles William Hobley, the Somalis attacked the Oromo in 1842 but were repelled. Peace was concluded in 1845, though fighting resumed in 1848, when the Somalis reportedly gained the upper hand, killing about 2,000 Oromo elders and chiefs and capturing about 80,000 women and children. According to Lee V. Cassanelli, the conflict in southern Somalia between Somali and Oromo groups resulted in the capture and enslavement of a large amount of Oromo women. British explorer Harald George Carlos Swayne (1900) described a Somali raiding party of around 1,000 men near the Oromo settlement of Golbanti. One 19th century Ogaden slave trader recounted a series of battles that resulted in the capture of 30,000 livestock and 8,000 Oromo women and children. The heavy traffic in Oromo slaves led one historian to describe the period as a 'golden age' for slave traders. According to a 1894 British report on the Ogaden living in Jubaland, the Ogaden numbered around 5000 and had 2000 slaves of Oromo origin.

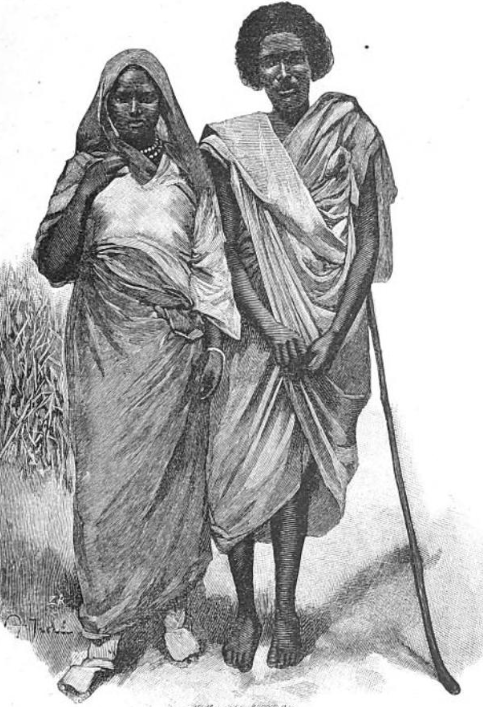
Somali man in Bardera with his Oromo concubine, 1895.

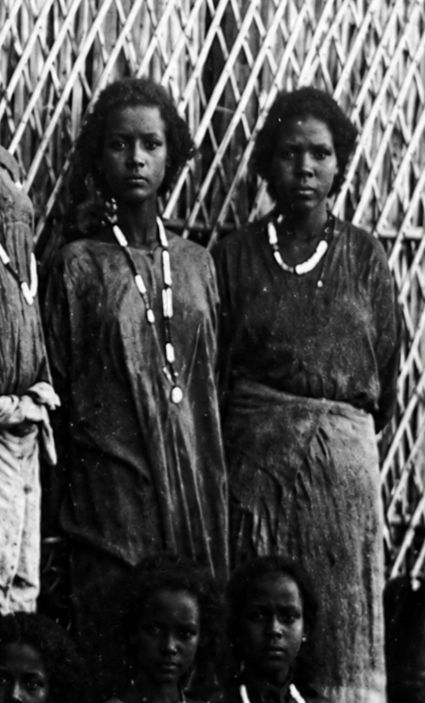
Oromo girls rescued from a slave-dhow in the Gulf of Aden.

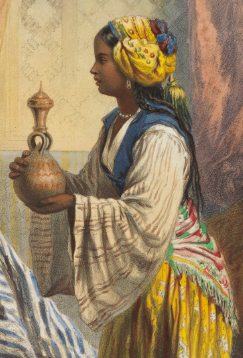
Illustration of an enslaved Oromo woman in Ottoman Egypt, 19th century.

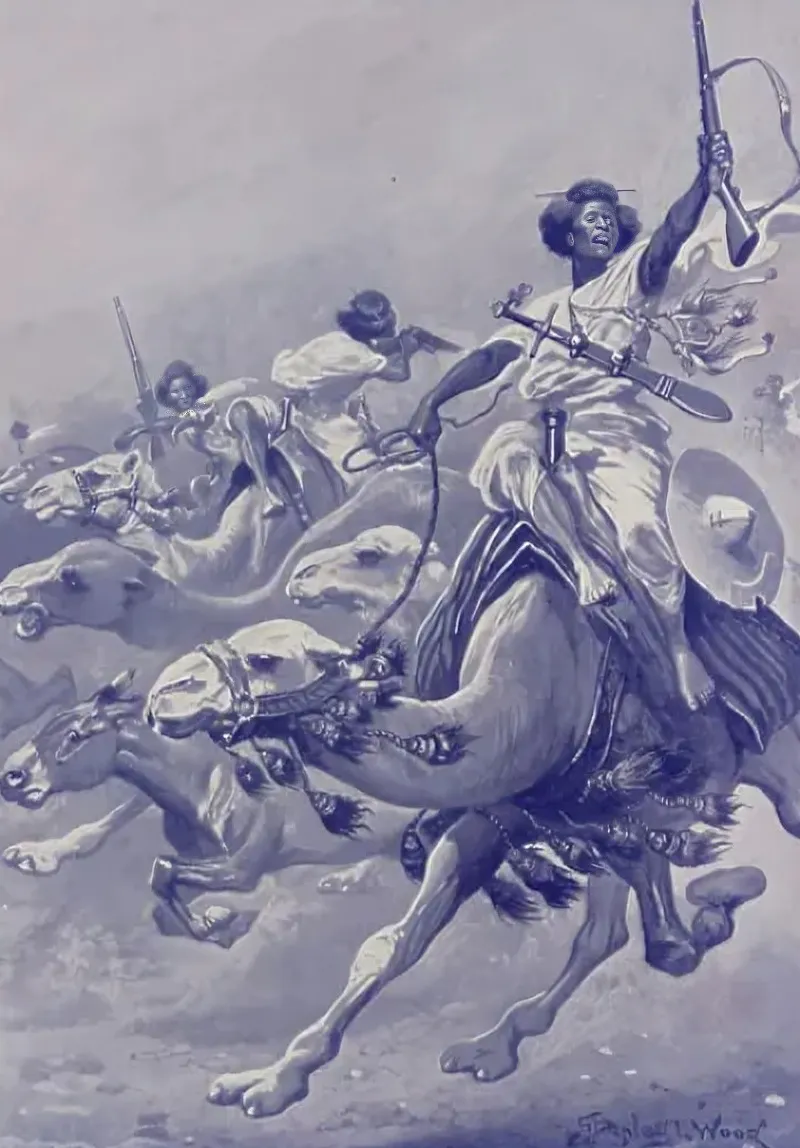
Drawing of a Somali raiding party.

Somali traders also obtained Oromo captives through other means. According to Vittorio Bottego, livestock losses would often lead Oromo families to sell relatives to the Somalis in order to avoid starvation, while others voluntarily sold themselves to passing caravans. Gustavo Chiesi writes that Somali merchants also procured slaves from the Borana through trade, Borana mothers and fathers sold their children to Ajuran caravans in exchange for cotton or a few thalers. The Italian historian Stefano Bellucci notes that some slaves in the region may also have originated from present-day central Ethiopia, captured during the Abyssinian wars of expansion in the second half of the 19th century. In 1896, contemporary accounts noted that Menelik's soldiers supplied themselves with slaves in the Galla (Oromo) regions. In 1913, Giuseppe Piazza documented that the Amhara sold Arsi Oromo captives to Somalis. Mohammed Hassen estimated that more than a million Oromos were seized and enslaved during the reign of Menelik II, largely through military campaigns and slave-raiding practices carried out by his forces. According to Bob Allen, Menelik's wars generated many captives, including Oromo prisoners, who were sold as slaves and exported through Berbera. In 1850, Afar slave merchants reportedly acquired slaves from the Wello Oromo and transported them to Berbera, which was considered a more profitable market than Tadjoura.

Richard Pankhurst estimated that between 1800 and 1850, 1.25 million Oromo, Gurage and Sidama slaves were exported from the ports of Massawa, Tadjura, Zeila, and Berbera. The slaves taken in the western Oromo regions were usually sent to Massawa, while Zeila served as the main market for those captured from the eastern Oromo areas. Oromo slaves from Shewa walked for 21 days to the port of Zeila where they were sold. By 1876, large numbers of slaves were still reportedly being exported from Zeila to Hodeida in Yemen. A French traveller writing from Zeila in 1881 noted that most of the slaves found there were Oromo women captured as prisoners of war. Due to British restrictions on the slave trade in Yemen, most slaves exported from Zeila were sent to the Hijaz rather than Aden. According to a 1923 League of Nations report, Oromo captives taken as prisoners of war in the 19th century were exported by Muslim merchants to Zeila. The number of slaves transported to the Gulf of Aden ports such as Zeila appears to have been substantially higher than the amount exported through Massawa. In 1884, the same year Britain took control of Zeila, it was estimated that between 6,000 and 8,000 slaves arrived at the port. Multiple European travelers documented the sale of Oromo slaves at Zeila.

During his travel to Harar, Richard Burton met several Oromo slave girls. In the mid 19th and early 20th centuries, Oromo slaves were more common than Bantu slaves in the interior of northern Somali speaking regions. Harar was described as a "rendez-vous" point for all the slave caravans in the region. In Burton's time, slaves were one of the principal exports from Harar to the Somali coast. The city functioned as a major transit point for enslaved people coming from Gurage and Oromo territories, with Amharas considered the most valued in slave markets. According to Richard Burton, slaves found in Harar were mainly Gurage and Oromo. Arsi Oromos made captive by the Ogaden were also sent directly to Berbera. In Harar, Philipp Paulitschke reported that Oromo captives were brought into the city and then taken by caravan to Zeila and Berbera to be sold. The Emir Abdullahi also launched slave-raids on Oromo villages surrounding the city. W.C. Barker (1842) and Major Rayne (1921) write that slaves from Harar were exported through Zeila and Berbera.

A British report from 1840 states that the northern Somali tribes carried out regular slave-raiding expeditions against Oromo populations, with captives sold in Arabian markets, female slaves reportedly sold for 15 to 35 dollars. In the 1850s, a British crew reportedly observed hundreds of Oromo slaves for sale at the port of Berbera. In 1856, the British forced the Habr Awal to sign a treaty that outlawed slavery at Berbera and in the region. However, in April 1869 the British had to free 135 young Oromo slaves being sold at Berbera, bringing them to Aden. Berbera was one of the most significant slave-trading ports in the 19th century. Merchants from various regions travelled long distances there to exchange goods such as agricultural produce, coffee, copperleaf, and cotton textiles in exchange for enslaved people. For each enslaved person sold at Berbera, the governor of Zeila received a duty of 3/4 of a dollar, while the sultan of Tadjoura received the remaining quarter. No fewer than half of the enslaved people sold at Berbera were transported to ports such as Mokha, Hodeida, and Jeddah. The remainder were taken to coastal towns in present-day Yemen, including Shuqra, Mukalla, and Shihr before being redistributed to ports in the Persian Gulf and Oman Gulf, and in some cases as far as the Kathiawar coast of India. According to Richard Burton, 6000 Oromo slaves were exported from Zeila and Berbera annually. It is estimated that during the 19th century, more than 2000 slaves were shipped annually from the northern Somali coast to the Persian Gulf. In 1873, Oromo slaves were reportedly being exported from Zeila to the Persian gulf, with the females costing around $75. Oromo slaves were also exported to Persia from the Banadir ports in southern Somalia. In the south of the peninsula, most of the Oromo slaves captured in the interior were sent to the coast via Bardera. In the 1840s, Shaikh Abu Bakr of Bardera led several raiding expeditions against the Oromo. Gustavo Chiesi writes that before the Italians moved askaris at Bardera, it was the main transit point for slaves coming from the Oromo region to the coast. The town of Luuq was another major inland slave-market. According to Lamberto Vannutelli, aside from the Somalis, a significant number of Borana and Arussi Oromo slaves lived in Luuq. Harold D. Nelson writes that slaves coming from northern Kenya and the Oromo were largely absorbed within Somali society rather than being exported. Garre caravans imported slaves from the Borana to Luuq. The Somali Gasaargude clan living in and around Luuq reportedly consisted of 202 men and owned 209 female slaves. Philip Howard Colomb noted that Oromo slave-girls were exported from the city of Barawa. He reported seeing six Oromo slaves being bought there. Second and third-generation slaves were reported to be living in Barawa. In the decades following the 1860s, nearly half of the 82 slave-carrying dhows captured by the British in East-Africa were caught along the Banadir coast, most of them in the harbours of Barawa and Merka. The Tunni Somalis living around Barawa had around 4000 Oromo and Swahili slaves. Gustavo Chiesi describes the Tunni living in Barawa as owning many "Galla" and "Boran" slaves. Qadi court records in Barawa mention Oromo slaves. In the mid 19th century, contemporary European accounts stated that grain in the environs of Barawa was cultivated by Oromo slaves. When British Captain Smee visited the southern Somali coast in 1811, he described a flourishing slave trade, with enslaved people being transported down the Jubba River and brought to Barawa and other Somali ports for shipment. French vessels at that time were also reported to have taken on slave cargoes at these Somali ports. In 1866, the German explorer Richard Brenner met in Barawa a man with what he described as two "very pretty" Oromo concubines, with one of them living in his plantation.

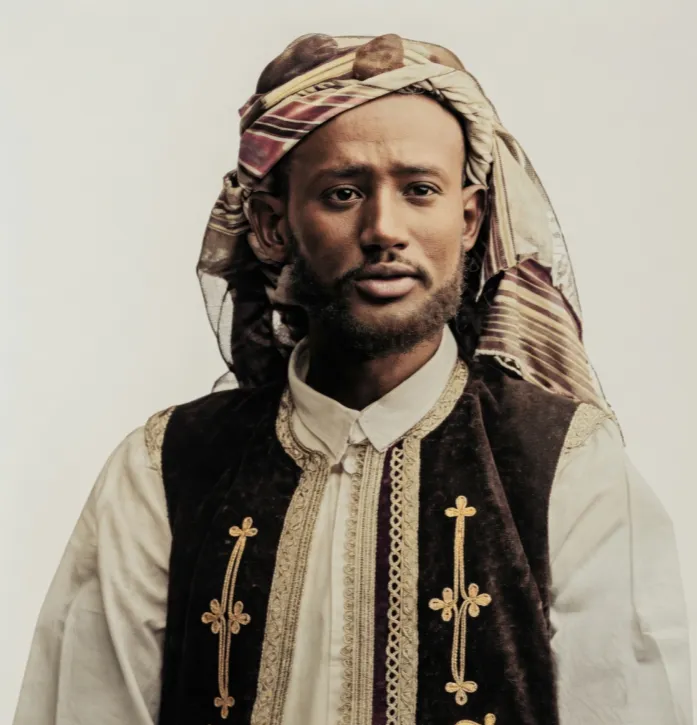
Sharif Hussein, a Kablalah Somali merchant who led raids across the Tana River into Oromo territory. Contemporary accounts record that the Oromo inhabitants of Witu would flee into the woods whenever he arrived to trade.

A member of the Anti-Slavery Society in Tehran reported in 1898 that between 30,000 and 50,000 enslaved Africans were living in Iran, roughly half of whom were Oromo women. Oromo women commanded some of the highest prices in Iranian slave markets and were often purchased as concubines. Enslaved Oromo and Gurage people introduced several cultural traditions into Iranian society, including the Zar, Liwa, and Gowat ceremonies. According to the Iranian historian Behnaz Mirzai, the most valued African harem servants in Persia were Ethiopian women. The children born to these concubines were treated as having equal rights to those of children born to free women. As young women, they served their mistresses, but as they grew older they were often treated by their masters as wives rather than as servants. Johann Ludwig Krapf noted that the Oromo slave girls sold at Somali ports were in great demand in the Swahili coast, often ending up in the harems of prominent people. In 19th century Zanzibar, Oromo slave girls were greatly valued and were bought by the Sultans for their harem. Somalis would also infrequently bring a few captured Oromos to Lamu.

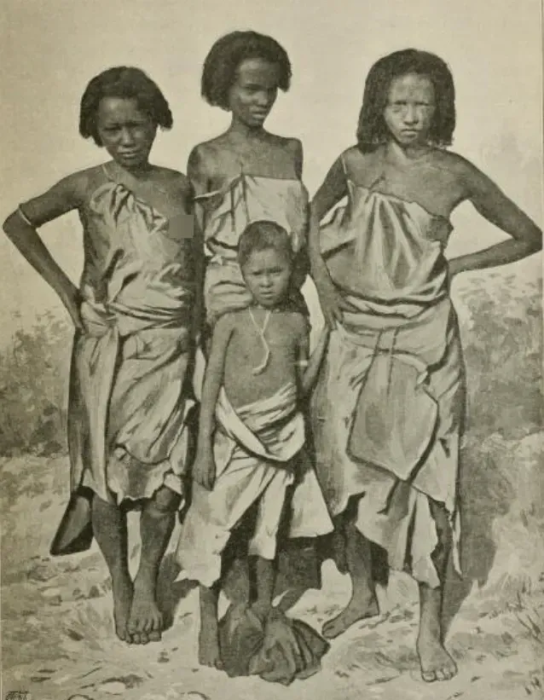
Arsi Oromo slaves of the Degodia Somalis freed by Vittorio Bottego during his 1893 expedition in Somalia.

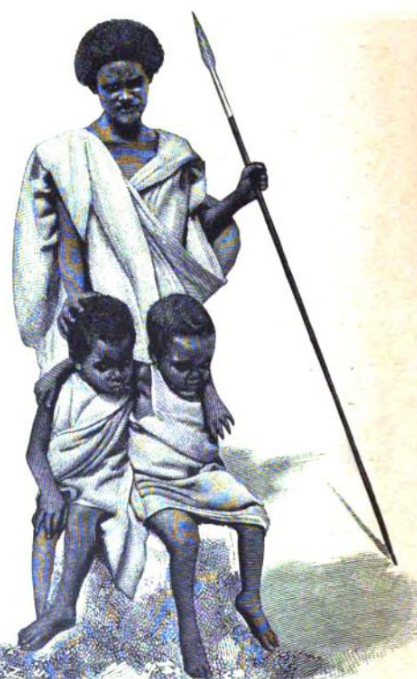
Marehan Somali man selling two Oromo boys at Bardera (1895)

Throughout the 19th century, Oromo slave girls were among the most sought-after in slave markets, second only to white slave girls from the Caucasus. However, following the Russian conquest of the Caucasus in 1864, Oromo slave girls came to occupy the highest position in the slave markets of the Muslim world and became increasingly profitable in the slave trade. Mordechai Abir notes that most young Ethiopian concubines exported from Zeila and Berbera were of Oromo and Sidama origin. Oromo women were so desired that "there was hardly a harem in Arabia that had no Oromo girls." In Mecca, the widespread practice of keeping female slaves led to a mixture of Abyssinian ancestry, which was said to give the Meccawis a distinct complexion compared to desert Arabs. The British traveller Charles Doughty noted that there were so many Oromos in Mecca and Medina that “Habashy” was commonly spoken from house to house. French explorer Edmond Combes found what he described as a large number of Oromo slaves in Yemen. Historian Richard Pankhurst noted that large numbers of Oromo slaves were present in Mokha and throughout Yemen in the 19th century, many of them exported via Zeila. According to Maurice Tamisier, the Arabian port of Jeddah was inhabited in 1834 by a large number of Oromo slaves of both sexes. The German Gerhard Rohlfs reported that there lived about 1000 Turks in Jeddah who were active in the slave trade, and about 5000 slaves were brought to the port every year from Zeila and Suakin. According to Richard Burton, most Abyssinian slave girls in Arabia were Oromo. Edward William Lane (1871) says something similar. In Mecca, Medina, Hail, and Boraida, enslaved Oromo people were valued for their height, and the men served as bodyguards for local amirs. Ethiopian slaves were likewise regarded as effective soldiers by the chiefs of Bahrain. Most of the slaves sent to Yemen through Zeila were resold throughout the Arabian Peninsula, Egypt and other Ottoman controlled territories, this system only changed in 1869 with the opening of the Suez Canal, after which enslaved people from Somalia who arrived in Yemen and the Hijaz could be transported directly to the slave markets of Istanbul. Somalia was one of the main supplier of slaves for the Ottoman empire in the 19th century. In the 19th century, 7000-12,000 slaves were sold annually to the Ottomans through the ports of Zeila, Berbera, and Massawa.

In 1865, the British Consul at Zanzibar was cited as having stated that:

"The Gallas are a warlike and vast nation in the interior, and their hand is against every stranger simply because they know strangers only as slave-hunters. The Arabs, the Abyssinians, and the Somalis all hunt them and take them into slavery."

In 1876, British Admiral Sir Francis William Sullivan was interviewed by the British Royal Commission on Fugitive Slaves, he described the Somali slave trade as follows:

"-You say that generally speaking there is as much slave trade as ever. Where do the slaves go now? -They are absorbed north. Do they go to Asia? -Yes, they must go to Asia. They gradually go up the Somali coast, which only wants a certain number of them; they can only absorb a certain number of them, and they must go on. It is a very fertile country, with a large population, and Somalis must have slaves; but it is a very warlike tribe, and they make slaves of the conquered people, often of the Galla tribe. -Do they import slaves largely ? -Yes, but chiefly for export again. -The Somali trade in slaves is large ? -Very large. I liberated 320 off Brava, which is on the Somali coast. -Do the Somalis themselves carry on the same trade by sea ? -Yes. There is the case of a dhow which I took, bound from the Somali country to Makullah, with 60 negroes on board, out of whom there were 11 Somalis who declared that all the other negroes were their domestic slaves. -Were there no Arabs on board that vessel ? -There was one Arab, the captain; but the dhow was subsequently restored at the instigation of the Indian government on the strength of the Somali's story. -Do the Somalis as a rule navigate their own vessels ? -Yes; it is only coast navigation in those dhows.

In July 1891, during his exploration of the Juba River, British Captain Frederick George Dundas saw Oromo slave girls living among Somalis:

"As we came alongside the right bank at Hadjowen, the natives crowded down to look at the vessel.. I noticed numbers of Galla slave-girls about, the different features and lighter colour marking them out from the Somalis, who are very black."

According to Ainslee's Magazine of August 1900:

"The favorite girls are those captured from the Boran Gallas, whose charms appeal to Arabian Moslems somewhat as those of the Circassian women do to the Turks. The Boran are particularly renowned for their beauty, and a slave thief will risk his life to obtain one."

=== Other groups ===
According to the historian Mordechai Abir, Gurage slaves were commonly sold at Berbera, particularly women taken as concubines. Contemporary accounts describe Gurage girls as being valued by buyers for their lighter complexion and features. The explorer Antoine d’Abbadie reported that Gurage slave girls were considered among the most desirable in the Somali country, "Quraqa" became a general term to denote slaves in Berbera. Richard Pankhurst writes that merchants from Gondar travelled to Berbera to sell slaves in the 19th century. Enslaved Cushitic-speaking Sidama and Agew people constituted a portion of the slaves exported from Zeila and Berbera. The Boni or Aweer people were also enslaved by the Ogaden Somalis in the 19th century. Somali slave merchants also imported slaves from the Kebena. According to Ehud Toledano, Sudanese slave traders from Dongola occasionally supplied Somalia in slaves.

In the 19th century, the Somalis raided and enslaved the Kore and Laikipiak Masai in Kenya, captives were sent to the city of Kismayo in Somalia to be sold to Somali traders. Portuguese missionary Leon des Avanchers mentioned seeing Masai among the Harti Somali when he visited the southern coast of Somalia in 1858. These Masai were freed by the British in the 1890s. Until 1903, the Somalis also occasionally launched slave-raids into the Bajuni archipelago. Bajuni slaves were sold in Somalia as early as 1624, as documented by Jeronimo Lobo. Slaves from the Kingdom of Wolaita and Kaffa were also imported into Somalia.

In 1820, an Omani vessel ran aground north of Mogadishu, and its entire crew was sold into slavery there. After a year in captivity, they were ransomed by friends in Zanzibar. In 1855, Richard Burton documented an Arab slave merchant selling a Yemeni girl from the Yafa'a tribe at Berbera.

=== Bantu slave trade ===
The Indian Ocean slave trade was multi-directional and changed over time. To meet the demand for menial labor, Bantu slaves were captured from southeastern Africa and sold in cumulatively large quantities over the centuries to customers in Egypt, Arabia, Somalia, Persia, India, the Far East, and the Indian Ocean islands.

In the 19th century, the growing demand for agricultural produce in the Arabian Peninsula drove Somalis to expand farming, however labor shortages in southern Somalia left much fertile land uncultivated, leading Somalis to purchase Bantu slaves from Zanzibar to supply the necessary labor. Bantu slaves were made to work in plantations owned by Somalis along the Shebelle and Jubba rivers, harvesting lucrative cash crops such as grain and cotton. According to Catherine Besteman, the maritime trade in Bantu slaves to Somalia expanded significantly during the early 19th century. Lee Cassanelli traced some of the earliest documented imports to the year 1800, when slaves from Tanzania were brought to Barawa. In 1833, the British naval officer W.F.W. Owens reported that Mogadishu imported slaves, while Lieutenant William Christopher observed slaves working in large numbers around Barawa, Marka, and Mogadishu during his 1843 expedition.

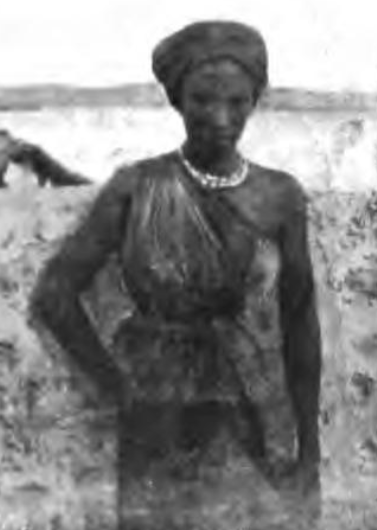
Bantu slave woman in Somalia, photographed in 1903 by Ugo Ferrandi.

According to scholar Esmond Bradley Martin, the Banadir coast was one of the major slave markets in the world during the 19th century. Most Bantu slaves destined for Somalia were first shipped from Zanzibar to Lamu, where Somali traders acquired them before transporting them northwards to the Banadir region. Throughout the 19th century, an estimated 300,000 slaves were imported into the Banadir coast from East Africa. Sources report exports of around 1,900 individuals leaving Lamu for Somalia in 1871, along with 2,804 individuals recorded as being sent to Barawa the same year. Additional accounts note approximately 1,800 people leaving the Lamu district overland for Somalia between 1873 and 1874, while Admiral Cumming reported in 1874 that about 12,000 slaves had arrived overland into Somalia. Somalis also occasionally kidnapped slaves from plantations around Lamu. During the famine of 1884–85, Somali traders travelled to Lamu and pressured the Liwali to sell slaves at reduced prices in exchange for cattle. These traders then transported the enslaved people to Somalia, where they were sold for profit. The ruler of Witu also sold slaves to the Somalis between 1870 and 1890 in exchange for cattle, gunpowder, and firearms. From the mid-1840s to the 1880s, agricultural land along the Webi Shebelle expanded considerably, supported by the growth of the slave trade. Most of the labourers on farms and plantations were enslaved people from the Swahili coast. With the establishment of the Imperial British East Africa Company and the subsequent British control of the Lamu archipelago in the 1890s, the kidnapping and sale of slaves to Somali traders in Lamu declined. According to Luigi Robecchi, the Tunni Somalis owned many plantation slaves. The majority of farmers along the Shabelle who employed slave labour were Cushitic Somalis rather than Arabs. In the early months of 1891, a slave dhow unloaded a large number of enslaved people just south of Barawa, many of whom were purchased by Tunni Somalis under a man named Abd al-Kader. When the ruler of Barawa learned of the landing, he became angry and initially intended to confiscate them, but was reportedly appeased after receiving beautiful slave woman as a gift. The vessel then continued north, and two days later the Italian journalist Gustavo Chiesi observed the remaining enslaved people bought by the Tunni, chained and working beyond the dunes near the village of Mudun, gathering firewood in the forest.

In the words of Chiesi (1909):

"Most of the slaves who arrived in the Benadir, either by sea or by land, were destined for the plantations along the river and the irrigation canals, in the so-called sciambe (shambas); many remained in coastal localities in the service of Arab, Hameran, and Somali notables and merchants, who, out of racial pride and religious superstition, avoided all manual labour, which they considered humiliating and contemptible."

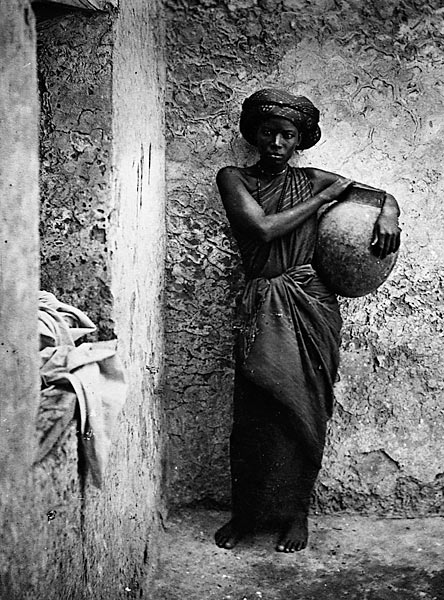
A Bantu servant woman in Mogadishu (1882–1883)

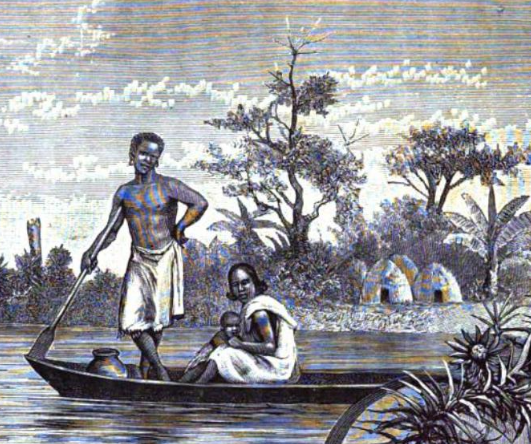
Pokomo family on the Tana river.

The Somali Bantus belong to several ethnic groups, namely Majindo, Mnyasa, Mkuwa, Mzihuwa, Mushunguli, and Molima, each consisting of numerous sub-tribes. Their ancestral roots can be traced back to various historical and modern African nations, including many in Central Africa, the Congo, Mozambique, Malawi, and Tanzania. According to Sasha Chanoff, most of the Bantu slaves sold to Somalis were from the Makua, Nyasa, Yao, Zaramo and Zigua ethnic groups of Tanzania, Mozambique and Malawi. A majority of slave-descended Bantu groups living along the banks of the Juba river hold that they are ethnically Niasa or Yao from Mozambique. In the 19th century, Bantu groups in Mozambique were reportedly engaged in continual warfare, primarily aimed at capturing prisoners, who were then sold. Bantus are ethnically, physically, and culturally distinct from Somalis and Ethiopians and they have remained marginalized ever since their arrival to the Horn of Africa. While traveling through the Somali country in 1900, Colonel Harald George Carlos Swayne met some of these Bantu slaves:

"On the Webbe Shabeleh, a river race called the Adone, also negroes, were working in the fields and punting rafts on the river for their masters, the Somalis."

In the second half of the 19th century, when the slave trade from Zanzibar to the Arabian peninsula was banned, the slaves captured by Zanzibari slave traders in East Africa were no longer transported from the Swahili coast to the Arabian peninsula on sea via Zanzibar due to the naval blockade, but instead forced to walk by land to Somalia, from which they could enter the slave dhows to Arabia away from British eyes. Nineteenth-century letters also indicate that Zanzibari slave merchants transported slaves by sea to Barawa and Mogadishu while avoiding British naval patrols.

Most of the Bantu living in southern Somalia are descendants of Bantus who were enslaved by the Sultanate of Zanzibar in the 18th century. However, the Somalis also sometimes raided and enslaved neighboring Bantu groups in Kenya, especially the Pokomo. British reports in 1894 described how the Somalis would come to the Pokomo country nearly every year during the dry season, carrying off women and children into slavery, while the Pokomo reportedly never dreamed of offering any resistance. By 1898, the Pokomo began building new villages in inaccessible jungle areas due to frequent Somali slave-raids. The Somalis also purchased Mijikenda slaves in the hundreds from Lamu in 1884 to be exported northwards until the Lamu-Banadir route was closed in 1893 by the British. Wituland was also reportedly raided by the Somalis for cattle and slaves.

In 1912, a French explorer described Somali slave raids into the Pokomo region:

"If the Ndura was so sparsely inhabited, it was because the Somalis had ravaged it in every way, stealing, pillaging, kidnapping women and children as slaves, and killing those who defended themselves."

== Prices of Slaves ==
Prices of female slaves in Mogadishu according to Luigi Robecchi Bricchetti (1904)

| Enslaved group | Age range | Prices |
|---|---|---|
| Oromo woman (as a concubine) | 15–20 years old | 90 thalers |
| Bantu woman (for work) | 18–20 years old | 65 thalers |
| Oromo woman (for work) | 18–20 years old | 60 thalers |
| Oromo teenager (for domestic work) | 10–15 years old | 50 thalers |
| Bantu teenager (for work) | 10–15 years old | 40 thalers |
| Girl child | 8–10 years old | 30 thalers |

Prices of male slaves in Mogadishu according to Luigi Robecchi Bricchetti (1904)

| Enslaved group | Age range | Prices |
|---|---|---|
| Strong Bantu adult | 20–25 years old | 89 thalers |
| Strong Oromo adult | 20–25 years old | 70 thalers |
| Bantu teenager | 15–20 years old | 60 thalers |
| Oromo teenager | 15–20 years old | 50 thalers |
| Bantu boy | 8–10 years old | 40 thalers |
| Oromo boy | 8–10 years old | 30 thalers |

Prices of slaves in Somalia in Maria Theresa dollars according to the economic historian Robert C. Allen.

| Enslaved group | Date & Location | Price (MT$) |
|---|---|---|
| Young adult male | Berbera (1830s-1840s) | $40 |
| Young adult female (domestic servant) | Berbera (1830s-1840s) | $40 |
| Young adult female (concubine) | Berbera (1830s-1840s) | $70 |
| Young adult female (concubine) | Mogadishu (1890–1913) | $90 |

General price range of slaves in the 19th century according to the scholar Ababu Minda Yimene.

| Enslaved group | Price (MT$) |
|---|---|
| Old man | 6-$7 |
| Old woman | 8-$12 |
| Young boy aged 10–14 years old | 18-$22 |
| Young girl aged 10–13 years old | 22-$27 |
| Young eunuch | 80-$100 |
| Young woman | 50-$150 |

Cost per kilometer of shipping slaves across the sea (MT$/km), according to the economic historian Robert C. Allen.

| Route | Enslaved Group & Year | Cost per km |
|---|---|---|
| Mogadishu-Muscat | Enslaved men (1900) | $0.0204 |
| Berbera-Muscat | Domestic slaves (1840) | $0.0102 |
| Berbera-Muscat | Concubines (1840) | $0.0233 |
| Berbera-Muscat | Enslaved men (1840) | $0.0122 |
| Berbera-Mokha | Concubines (1840) | $0.0532 |
| Berbera-Mokha | Enslaved men (1840) | $0.0399 |

According to historian and scholar Javan Mokebo, slave prices in Somalia were influenced by factors such as ethnic group, gender, and assigned roles. Oromo women were considered to be more sexually attractive and were highly valued for reproductive functions and entertainment, while Bantu women were more commonly associated with agricultural labor. As a result, Oromo women were reportedly priced at around 90 thalers, compared to approximately 65 thalers for a Bantu woman. Similarly, Bantu male slaves were valued at about 89 thalers, compared to roughly 60 thalers for Oromo male slaves. This difference in price was explained by the types of labor each group was expected to perform, Bantu men were more frequently assigned to intensive agricultural work and other physically demanding tasks, whereas Oromo men were allocated relatively less physically demanding tasks such as herding, based on contemporary perceptions that they were less able to sustain endurance-intensive labor. Age also determined the prices of slaves, young girls were generally valued at lower prices and were assigned to lighter household chores or grazing. However, as they reached adolescence, they were often considered suitable for concubinage. The same was true for young boys, who were commonly assigned to service roles such as acting as wood-cutters or messengers. Physical appearance was an important factor in both the selection and pricing of female slaves designated for concubinage in Somalia. The buyer's preferences also played a role, and where the interest was primarily erotic, female slaves were more likely to be acquired than male slaves. The existing literature places Oromo women among lighter-skinned female slaves who were frequently selected for concubinage in parts of the Horn of Africa.

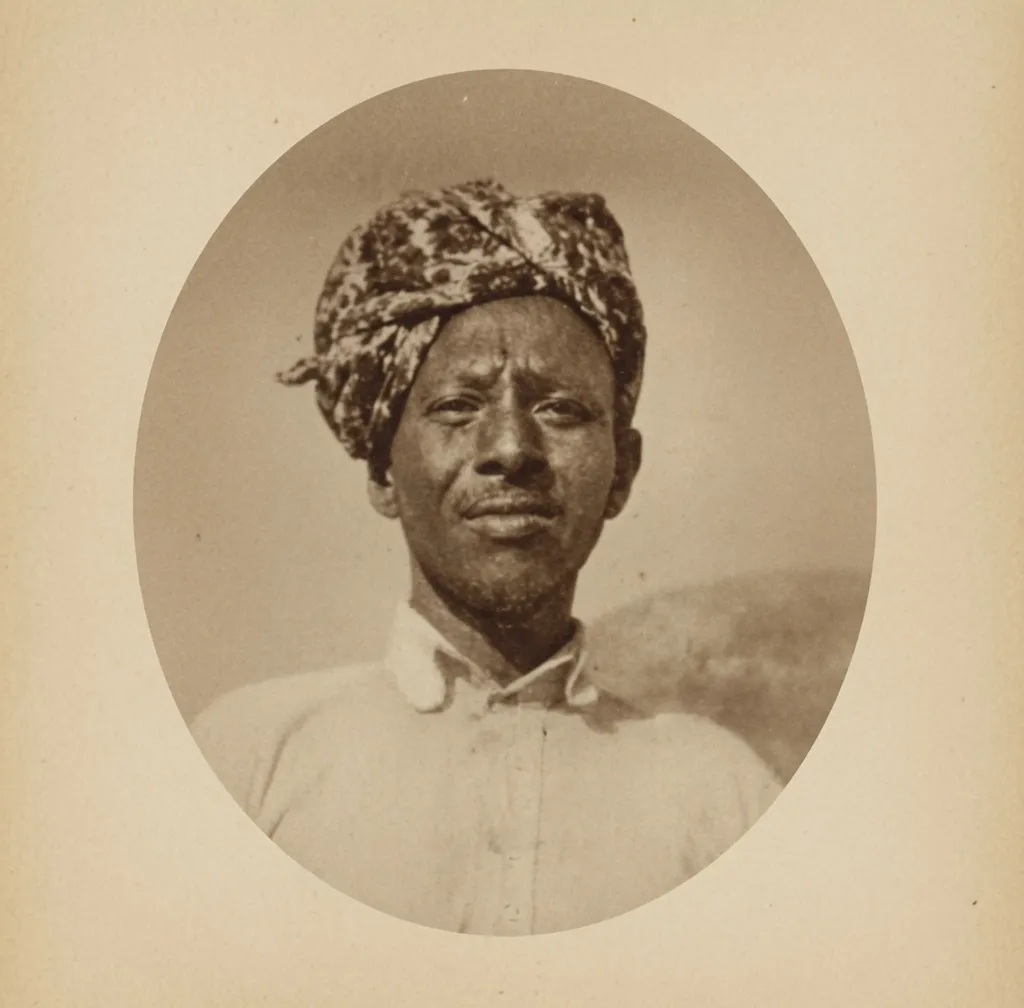
Early 20th century picture of a northern Somali slave merchant

Robert C. Allen notes that eunuchs and concubines commanded the highest prices in slave markets. Women were divided into two categories. Many were assigned menial domestic work and sold at relatively low prices, while those considered attractive were purchased as concubines or wives and fetched much higher prices, this was especially true for Oromo women, who were particularly valued in slave markets due to their perceived lighter skin and attractiveness, and were also regarded as hardworking and trustworthy.

Iranian historian Behnaz Mirzai states that Ethiopian women, mostly Oromos, were among the most highly valued in 19th century slave markets, where they were consistently described as especially desirable for their beauty and able to command higher prices. However, the value of these enslaved women reportedly declined after the age of 20. Older women were purchased primarily for work rather than for sexual or reproductive purposes. Enslaved women in Somalia were generally valued more highly than enslaved men, and those considered attractive or beautiful were often bought as concubines and domestic servants.

The following is a list of slave prices reported by various other sources.

| Enslaved group | Location and date | Prices | Sources |
|---|---|---|---|
| Amhara and Tigrayan slaves | Zeila, 13th century | 10-20 uqiyyah | |
| Oromo/Gurage slaves | Berbera, 1841 | 30-$60 | |
| Oromo/Gurage boys | Berbera, 1850 | 25-$35 | |
| Oromo/Gurage women | Berbera, 1850 | 80-$120 | |
| Oromo women | Zeila & Berbera, 1872 | 100-$125 | |
| Oromo women | Zeila, 1873 | $75 | |
| Oromo women | Southern Somali region, 1882 | $100 | |

== Slave names ==
For individual names, enslaved individuals in 19th-century Somalia were commonly given names by their masters. Court records indicate the use of Muslim-Arabic, Swahili-Bantu, and Oromo names, alongside common Somali names such as Abdi. Tribal affiliations and paternal names were often not recorded for Bantu slaves, whereas they were more frequently documented for Oromo slaves in the records. In the 1980s, Somalis commonly referred to the descendants of former slaves in Somalia using the term galla, a historical exonym for the Oromo people. According to multiple scholars, the term habash, previously used to refer to Abyssinian slaves, is also still used in the Somali language as a general designation for slaves, freed slaves, and the descendants of slaves.

The following is a list of terms used by different Somali clans to denote slaves or slave-descended populations.

| Isaaq | Darod | Hawiya | Rahanweyn | Others |
|---|---|---|---|---|
| horowa | adoon | habash, beerey, shambereey | ukkub, donad, adoon | mjikenda, bidde, sankadhuudhe, boon, beddo, oogi, jins al-mal, khadim |

== Slave Attires ==
Writing in 1909, the Italian journalist Gustavo Chiesi observed that women of slave origin favoured brightly coloured printed garments and described them as adorning themselves with various forms of jewellery:

"..It contrasts with the brightly coloured printed tops and the Banadir cloth wraps that women of slave origin preferred to wear. The same distinction was said to apply to adornment. While women of slave origin were described as favouring large silver bracelets and anklets and as wearing large metal earrings or curious ornaments made of coloured paper, Somali girls and women were said to prefer as their chief adornment strings of small beads or marine shells worn around the neck or chest."

== Roles & Hierarchies ==
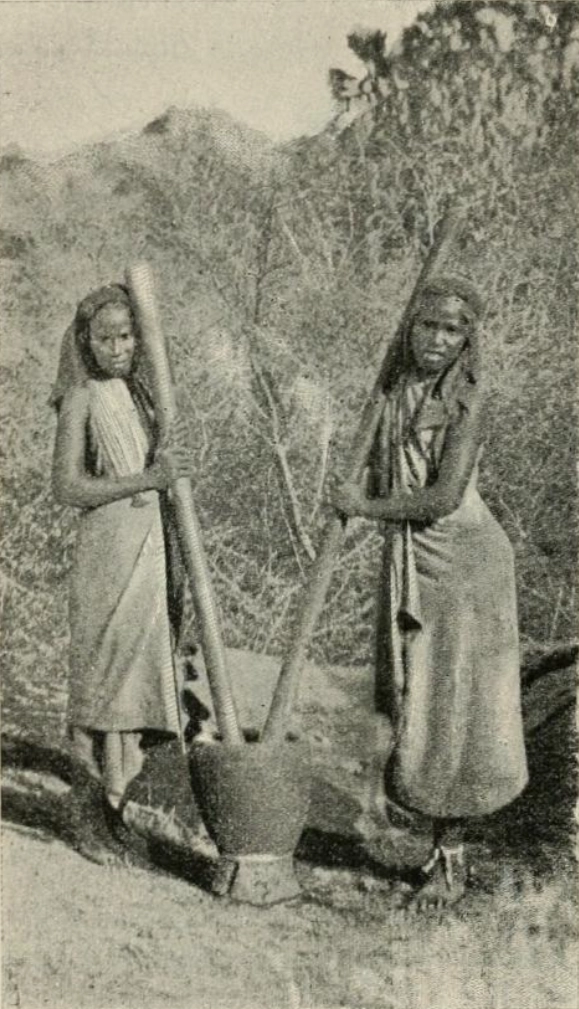
Oromo enslaved women pounding sorghum in the Luuq District, 1895

Bantu agricultural slaves were bought to work on plantations, they did undesirable work, and lived separately from their masters. Sexually and juridically their bodies were devalued, and strong social taboos discouraged unions between plantation slaves and Somali masters. According to Cerulli, among the Majerteen Somalis, sexual relations with female Bantu slaves were negatively viewed and socially stigmatized. However at times, less wealthy individuals also kept enslaved Bantu concubines. In contrast, herder slaves, mostly Oromo, were involved in relations of greater intimacy with their Somali masters and seen as legitimate sexual partners. They were taken into households and worked side by side with their masters. Young Oromo women were much sought after and were referred to as suriya/sorije, a term meaning concubine in the Islamic world. Slaves of Cushitic origin, such as the Oromo, were regarded by Somalis as more physically similar to themselves than Bantus, particularly due to perceptions of straighter hair and narrower noses, features that contributed to Oromo women being considered more desirable and more readily integrated into Somali society. Concubines of Oromo origin could more easily than others acquire important roles within a household after having borne children for the master. In plantations along the Shebelle river, enslaved concubines occupied key supervisory roles within plantation households. Because of the sexual or marital bond with their owners, they were regarded as more trustworthy than other enslaved workers and were sometimes placed in charge of overseeing labour and production. Borana Oromo women captured by the Marehan Somalis could reportedly gain equal status to other wives if they became pregnant with their master's child. Children could begin working as servants as young as eight years old. Italian censuses show clear gender divisions in slave labour. Men worked across a wide range of roles including domestic service, agriculture, skilled crafts, and transport such as sailing and carrying goods. Women were mainly assigned to domestic and agricultural tasks like childcare, looking after cattle, water carrying, farm work, processing animal products, and concubinage. Since slaves of Cushitic origin such as the Oromo were considered more akin to their masters, their children were probably integrated more easily among Somalis, to whom they were also believed to bear a resemblance in physiognomic terms. In general, Bantu slaves were considered much stronger than the Oromo and were reputed to be more enduring and persevering at work. Oromo slaves were almost never bought for agricultural work in part due to their lack of agricultural knowledge. Majority of domestic slaves in the Banadir were of Ethiopian origin. The Somali scholar Abdi Kusow writes that plantation workers were divided into two groups; cultivation and weaving were assigned to the men, and easier tasks of gathering the seeds and cleaning the husks to the women. According to William Gervase Clarence-Smith, Oromo slaves were bought to work in the textile industry of Mogadishu. Large-scale textile weaving for export was carried out by enslaved Oromo laborers. Nuredin H. Scikei however argues that while it is true that Ethiopian slaves were used in textile production, the majority of weavers were Somali.

According to Italian records, enslaved Oromo (Galla) women in Somalia were bought to serve as concubines and later employed in domestic service:

"The slaves are for the most part of Swahili origin, but there are also many female slaves of Galla origin, who, because of their almost European features, are highly desired first to serve as the master’s concubines and later to be assigned to domestic household work."

Writing in 1909, the Italian journalist Gustavo Chiesi described the role of slave women in Barawa as follows:

"The gossip of Barawa eventually makes its way to the wells, which serve, if not as a newspaper, then at least as the source of daily news. Nine-tenths, if not the entirety, of the women and girls who draw water from the wells and carry it to the houses belong to the slave population. They are Galla (and are considered the most beautiful), Borana, and Swahili (considered the least attractive), but they either were slaves, are slaves, or are the daughters of slaves. Yet, judging by their noisy cheerfulness and their ringing, silvery laughter over the slightest thing, one must conclude that they bore with great ease and nonchalance their unfortunate condition as human property.. the slave women grind the sorghum and maize from which bread is made to feed the whole family; they carry the water from which everyone drinks; and they make the butter that we take to the markets to be sold across the sea in exchange for the cotton cloth with which we all dress."

== Treatment of Slaves ==
The British Lieutenant Christopher (1844) described a plantation on the Shabelle valley as such:

"The hospitality of our Somali host produced excellent mutton boiled with rice; the only peculiarity being that the slaves, seated at some distance, were eager to receive the bones picked by their masters, which underwent a second, third, and fourth gnawing from successive hungry mouths before they were finally scattered as useless... The slaves and their wives are the labourers, housed miserably in small half-roofed huts, their usual food parched Indian corn and fish from the river... There were many thousands of men employed in cultivation here, their only shelter is formed by the loose stalks of the common millet piled up in a conical shape, and allowing three or four persons to sit together in the interior. They are thus screened from the sun, but exposed, of course, to the rain, and whole families thus pass their lives."

According to Vittorio Bottego:

"Slaves call their master "father"; they speak to him with great familiarity and are generally treated well. Their daily allowance is usually about a kilo and a half of dura per day. Slaves living with their master gather for meals in the courtyard. One slave carries a large pot of dura cotta and another the plates. The mistress of the house divides the portions. On Fridays, a Muslim holiday, slaves are given meat and milk in addition to the dura. Three times a year, for religious and solemn holidays, they receive a new top as a gift and, depending on the wealth of the household where they serve, an ox or a sheep to share in the meal. On these solemn occasions, they are also given plenty of milk and butter. There are coastal Somalis who try to improve the breed by carefully feeding them and mating them according to certain criteria, as cattle breeders do among us."

On another occasion, he encountered an Oromo slave boy who was being abused by his mistress:

"A very thin little boy wanted to come with me. He said that he was a Galla, that he had been captured by the Somalis a year earlier, and that he was now the slave of a woman who made him suffer from hunger and forced him to work beyond his strength. I accepted him into the caravan."

The Italian explorer Ugo Ferrandi was surprised by the extent of trust that masters in Luuq placed in their slaves :

"Slaves in Lugh are generally well treated, and it is often the case that they are considered members of the family. Indeed, I have seen some masters mourn the death of a slave as if it were that of their own son. Several times I have seen slaves sent on business for their masters to the coast as far as Zanzibar, returning from whence."

In 1909, Italian journalist Gustavo Chiesi observed that:

"The truth is that in Barawa, although there existed, as in all the other Benadir settlements, a slave population, the outward forms and customs of slavery in the relations between masters and slaves were so greatly softened that one was scarcely aware of its existence."

According to Robecchi Bricchetti:

"Every well-off Somali generally has a slave. In the villages of Banadir, there are still today, not less than two or three thousand slaves, they live with their masters who treat them just like any other household member, and they dress and eat like all Somalis, so much so that I am convinced that offering them liberty many of them would refuse immediately."

Giacinto Vicinanza, in his book "La Somalia Italiana" (1910) describes slavery in Somalia as such:

"The law of retaliation does not apply in the case of homicide when it is committed by a free man upon a slave. The slave is not obliged to fight in war, even if ordered to do so by the master, he also cannot be subjected to taxes, nor can his master be taxed on his behalf. The slave owes blind obedience to the master, he has no right to ask him for anything, the master may kill him without giving justification to anyone, the master may, with chains, prevent his escape or idleness. If the master wishes to sleep with one of his slave women, even if she is a virgin, the slave woman must be content with it."

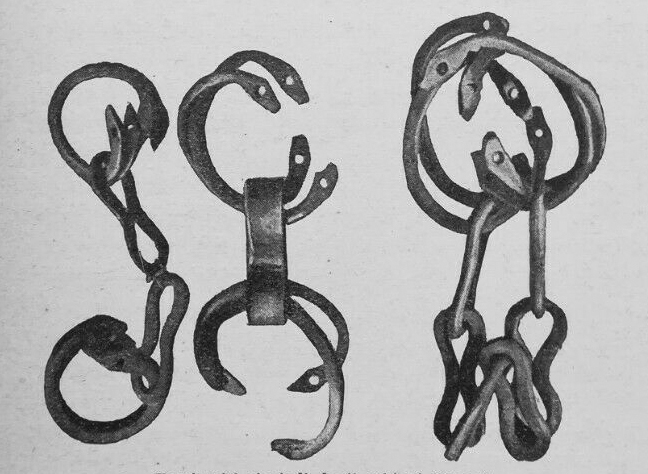
Returning from his visit to Somalia, Robecchi Bricchetti brought home a number of chains taken from the ankles of slaves in Barawa and Merka. Often these iron ankle rings could only be removed by a blacksmith.

Slave women could own their own commodities, although at times it was not easy to keep their rights over them, and negotiations were needed. Some enslaved women were able to accumulate limited personal wealth in the form of gold, silver, and other small valuables that could be discreetly hidden. According to Francesca Declich, despite the fact that female slaves could be easily accessed by their masters for intercourse, there are documented cases of concubines refusing to comply with sexual demands. Abortions were common, concubines aborted pregnancies using strong indigenous abortifacients prepared from pepper, colza seeds, colba, and honey. Some concubines were also afraid of what might happen should they deliver children after seeking abortions so persistently, as masters could separate children from their mothers to sell them. Among the Majerteen for instance, the prohibition in Muslim law against selling mothers separately from their small children was not always applied. One common punishment for disobedient Oromo slaves was assignment to agricultural or farm labour, which was considered less desirable than their usual roles as pastoral workers and concubines. According to Catherine Besteman, it is unlikely that herder slaves such as the Oromo were subjected to the same level of harsh treatment experienced by plantation slaves. According to the scholar Marc-Antoine Pérouse de Montclos, Oromo slaves in Somalia occupied the lowest position in the social hierarchy, lacked legal rights, and could not inherit property.

Evidence from qadi court records indicates that marriages between free men and slave women involved the payment of mahr by the groom to the enslaved woman's master, who retained the sum rather than the bride herself. Enslaved women experienced many difficulties in claiming rights over their own property, masters could to some extent negotiate rights over the offsprings of their female slaves, even if these women married free men. According to Italian records, masters could continue to have sexual relations with enslaved women even after they were married.

Plantation slaves were generally permitted to form family units. However, certain nomadic Somali clans, notably the Gaaljel, Wadaan, Bimal, and Mobileen, developed a reputation for comparatively harsher treatment of slaves, both locally enslaved individuals and those imported.

Luigi Robecchi Bricchetti writes that slaves in Mogadishu and other Benadir cities appeared deeply devoted to their masters, and he claimed to find few testimonies of abuse among them. He contrasted this with the treatment of slaves among other inland groups such as the Bimal, where slaves were reportedly kept in iron ankle restraints. According to the historians Benjamin Lawrance and Richard Roberts, the compilers of the Barawa qadi court manuscripts note that the documents indirectly suggest slaves in the city of Barawa were “comparatively well treated” with light punishments for transgressions and relatively few recorded cases of violence.

Francesca Declich argues that the institution of slavery in Somalia was not solely of the “soft” type described by some observers. In certain regions it involved an absolute lack of personal freedom, with plantation slaves in rural areas chained to prevent their escape, and in the case of women, this also entailed a loss of control over their bodies. Masters could also severely beat slaves who attempted to flee and subject them to chains. Generally, slaves in Somalia received the worst treatment among pastoral nomadic people and in agricultural estates close to the river banks, out of fear that they would escape. Likewise Toyin Falola writes that the Hawiya nomadic Somalis had a reputation for mistreating their Bantu agricultural slaves, who were often kept in shackles, overworked, and underfed.

== Runaway slaves ==
There is little evidence of Bantu-speaking communities along the Juba and Shabelle rivers before 19th century. Increased slave imports to the Banadir coast in the 1800s led to the emergence of Bantu communities of escaped slaves mainly on the Juba river. The major growth of the fugitive slave population began after 1841. Enslaved individuals who escaped servitude in southern Somalia were reported to have fled to the Bajuni Archipelago. In the 19th century, around one thousand escaped Oromo slaves were said to have lived in Burgabo.

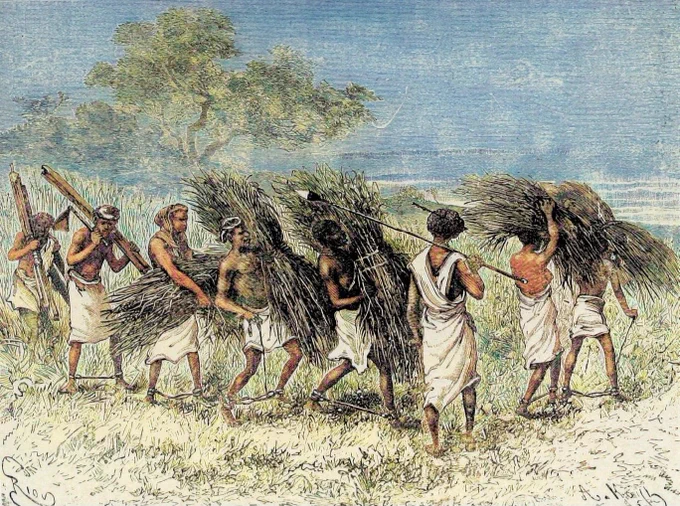
19th century illustration depicting a Somali master (holding the spear) watching over enslaved individuals.

Around 1829, a large number of Zigua people from northern Tanzania were enslaved and transported to Lamu and the Banadir coast via Zanzibar. By 1844, many had escaped and established a settlement about 75 miles up the Juba River. During the visit of Arcangelo, an Italian traveler, their population was estimated at 1,500. They lived in a main village divided by the river, along with several smaller settlements. Arcangelo reported that the communities were steadily increasing through the arrival of runaway slaves, and that the main settlement was fortified with a double stockade of thorn branches for protection against Somali attacks. The inhabitants were sedentary and produced a form of cotton cloth. In 1863, Claus von der Decken travelled up the Juba river, where he recorded a fortified settlement of about 600-700 people made up of former slaves from diverse East African groups, mainly engaged in agriculture and trade with the Somali, they traded maize, millet, bananas, and other plant foods to Somali groups in exchange for guns, powder, lead, tools, and beads, adding variety to the mainly meat-based Somali diet. Further upstream, he found Zigua-inhabited villages. Their inhabitants traced origins to northern Tanzania and were estimated at 4,000 people in total, practising mixed farming. By 1891, F. G. Dundas described the “Gosha” as expanding communities of escaped slaves along the river, cultivating a wide range of crops and trading with the Somali city of Kismayo. He estimated their population at 30,000-40,000. By the late 19th century, colonial observers noted a continuous belt of Gosha settlements along the river, which over time became increasingly integrated into surrounding Somali society and adopted the Somali language by the early 20th century.

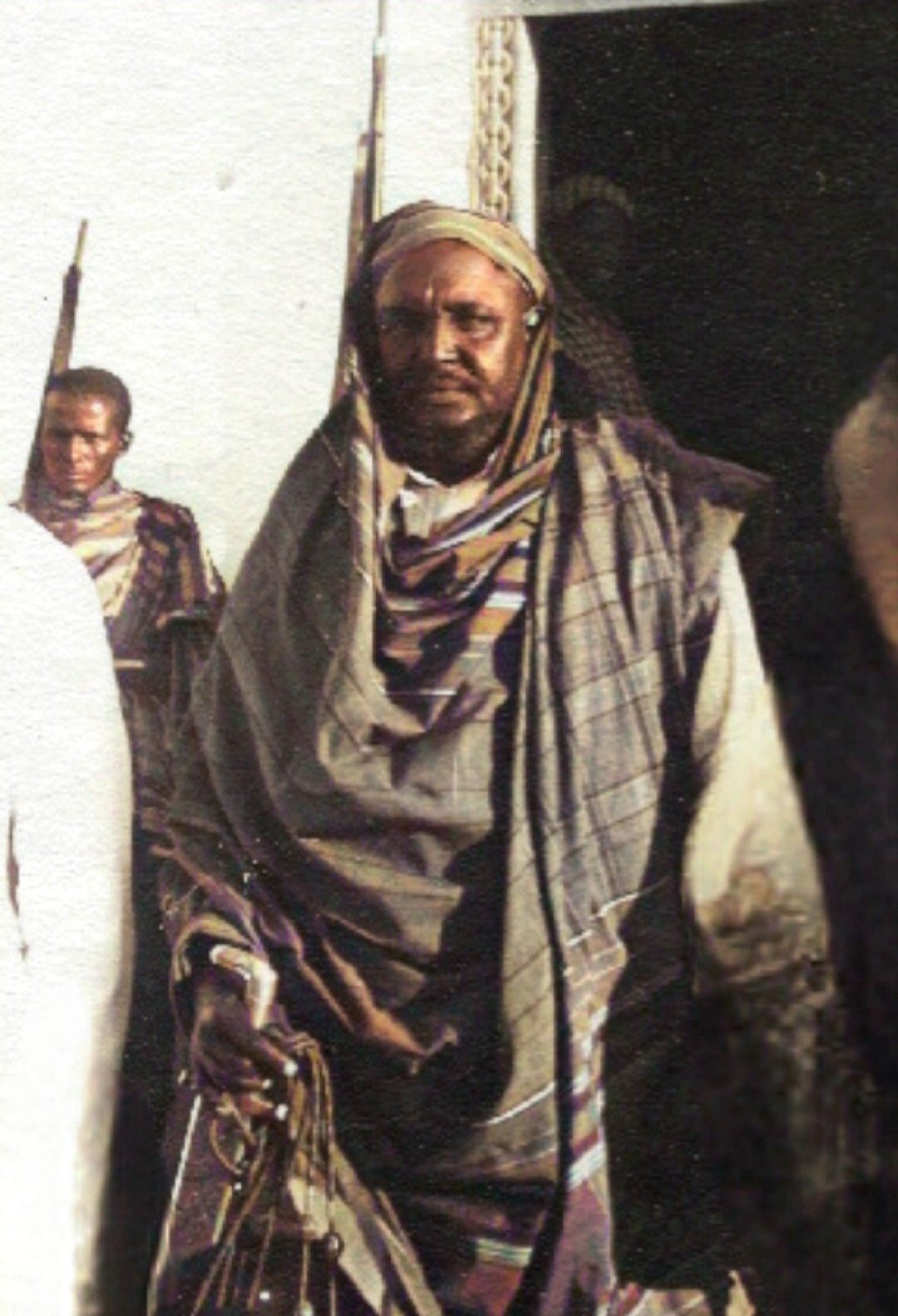
Sultan Osman of the Majerteen.

Although these communities later became known as the WaGosha, the term itself does not appear before the 1870s, when Nasib Bundo, a freed slave, proclaimed himself Sultan of the WaGosha. The most prominent remembered event in Gosha history was during this period (1875–95), when the Gosha defeated a major attack by the pastoral Ogaden Somalis around 1890, an event still recalled in oral tradition throughout the valley in the 1980s. The Gosha victory over local Ogaden pastoralists is primarily attributed to the leadership of Nasib Bundo, a Yao ex-slave who rose to prominence in Gosha-Boni conflicts and styled himself the “Sultan of the Gosha.” His reputation grew through negotiations with prominent Somali leaders, the sultan of Zanzibar, Egyptian authorities, and later British and Italian colonial officials. In Gosha oral traditions, Nasib is sometimes portrayed in near-mythical terms, credited with extraordinary martial and supernatural abilities in defeating Ogaden forces. Colonial authorities regarded him as the most prominent Gosha intermediary, and written accounts describe the emergence of a Gosha confederacy under his leadership. The Goshas generally avoided entering Somali territory, trade during this period was largely conducted between Ogaden Somalis and Gosha communities at a place remembered as Regatta, a plain with wide visibility and limited opportunity for ambush, thus relations between the two groups thus consisted primarily of a combination of trade and raiding. At times, Nasib Bundo made agreements with certain Somali clans to return escaped slaves to their owners, namely the Bimal, who were heavily dependent on slave labour for cultivation. Earlier European travelers instead identified riverine cultivators by their respective ethnic or tribal origins. Besides the Gosha settlements on the Juba river, escaped slave communities also existed along the lower Shabelle river. In 1843, William Christopher noted runaway slave villages, including one at Golweyn on the Shabelle, though their ethnic origins remain uncertain. Later, the Italian ethnographer Vincenzo Colucci reported the existence of about 15 small villages which were used as transit points for slaves fleeing toward the Gosha settlements along the lower Juba river. In the early 1870s, Gosha villagers were able to band together to defeat and subordinate the neighboring Boni to whom they had initially been forced to pay tribute, a victory achieved with the use of guns acquired from the sultan of Zanzibar in exchange for the promise of a share of ivory to the sultan. By the late 19th century, Somali proselytisers were successfully spreading Islam among the Gosha.

Later during the Italian colonial administration, evidence shows continued disputes over slavery and fugitive labor on the Banadir coast. In 1900, Italian Governor Emilio Dulio reported that slaves had escaped from Ras Aseir using a Somali ship, with some reaching Mogadishu and Marka. Mohamed Osman, Sultan of the Majeerteen, requested their return, but Dulio refused, citing Italy's obligations under international law and the absence of any agreement with the Sultan.

According to Oliver Schulten, fugitive slaves from modern day Sudan lived in Somalia in the 19th century.

== Manumission & Emancipation ==
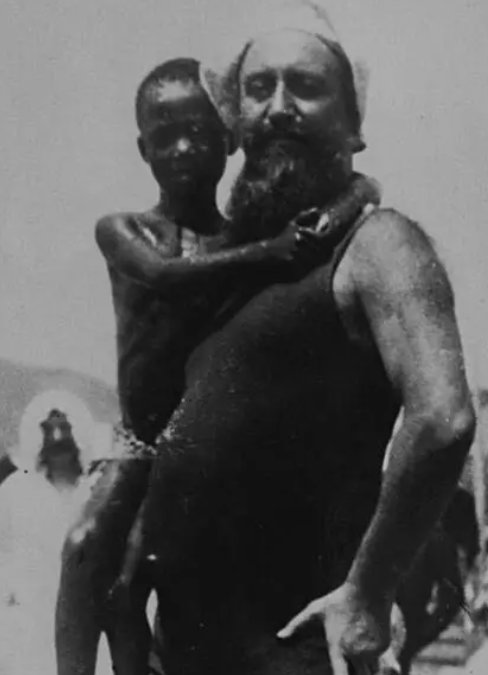
Robecchi Bricchetti holding his 4 year old adopted son, whom he had freed from slavery in Somalia.

Francesca Declich noted that an Oromo man regarded as docile and useful, unlike one considered troublesome, could often be emancipated and attain the status of a freedman. One of the most influential and respected Somali ulama of the 19th century, sheikh Uways al-Barawi, was an emancipated Somalized slave. His main teacher, sheikh Muhammad Jenay, convinced Uways to visit the Qadiriya headquarters in Baghdad, where he was eventually appointed a Sufi master and given the task of spreading the Qadiriya in the Horn of Africa. Sufi orders, particularly within the Shafi'i tradition, played a role in integrating former slaves into the local Muslim communities, with Sufi orders establishing agricultural settlements for freed slaves in areas unsuitable for pastoralism.

Vittorio Bottego also observed that slaves who had served faithfully over a long period often regained their freedom upon the death of their master. However, cases of slaves purchasing their own freedom were extremely rare, and they were mostly liberated by masters or colonial government officials. During his short stay in Somalia in 1903, Luigi Robecchi Bricchetti witnessed the emancipation of around 50 slaves, he also personally purchased the freedom of two slaves.

For female slaves, manumission was more complex. Under Islamic law, slave women who bore children to their owner were to be freed upon the master's death on account of maternity. Slave women to be freed on account of maternity only acquired the right not to be sold, pledged or transferred as donations. In practice, this status often provided limited protection rather than granting full independence, as they typically remained bound to household duties, including cohabitation with the master. Emancipation in practice depended heavily on the master's consent, Italian records describe a case in which a slave woman who had borne three children by her master's son was not freed despite legal expectations, as the master demanded 100 talleri for her manumission.

Concubines often remained dependent on their masters rather than pursuing or purchasing freedom, with only their children generally recognized as free. Among the Majerteen, concubines could receive allowances for themselves and their children without being emancipated. In some cases, slave women who had borne several children acquired informal advantages within the household, such as exemption from agricultural labor or the ability to keep income from selling milk, making negotiation for better conditions more common than escape or self-purchase. For a slave woman, the primary objective was not necessarily to attain the formal status of a freed woman but rather to secure a stable relationship with a wealthy patron capable of providing better care and protection. In the city of Barawa for example, remaining in slavery rather than attempting to escape could in some cases have been a more effective strategy for improving living conditions and overall quality of life for enslaved women. According to Catherine Besteman, without their own animals or grazing land, manumitted pastoral slaves such as the Oromo were much more likely to remain in a relationship with their former masters. In Barawa, a case recorded in qadi court manuscripts involved a slave girl named Zeinab who was kidnapped and later escaped after being sold by her kidnappers to another master. She voluntarily returned to the household of her original owner, which led to litigation before the qadi court between the original owner and the alleged bona fide purchaser. The purchaser lost the case, although the judge ordered the return of his purchase money.

According to Vittorio Bottego, among the Rahanweyn Somalis lived a race of freed slaves known as the Gubahin, he says the following on their origins:

"Many years ago, a Garra-Ganana sheikh named Osman Madoba Mussa purchased a pair of slaves on a voyage to Zanzibar. The male's name was Gubahin. Upon his death, Shekh Madoba ordered that the slave Gubahin and his family be set free. Gubahin's sons, married to Boran and Suhaeli slaves, multiplied so much that many years later they formed a race. If this particular story is generalized to a number of cases, it is understood how the Gubahin race emerged from the liberation of slaves. It is therefore wrongly said that the Gubahin are of Somali origin. The Somalis in fact consider them inferior, and the Gubahin even today only marry among themselves or with Galla and Suhaéli slaves."

== Legal traditions ==
Legally, slaves could only be obtained as captives of war or as the progeny of existing slaves. According to the Italian explorer Vittorio Bottego, a slave's owner was liable for the slave's actions; if a slave committed theft his master had to pay back for the stolen item, if a slave killed another master's slave, the owner compensated either in money or with another slave, if a free person was killed, the owner paid the dia or faced retribution. Slaves who killed their master or relatives were usually punished by beating rather than execution due to their economic value. If a runaway slave was captured, he had to be chained.

Captain Salkeld, a British officer in Jubaland in the early 20th century documented the following laws regarding slavery among the Somali:

"If a Galla or slave strikes a Somali woman he may be killed wherever met. If a Somali kills another owner's slave he pays 15 heifers. The killing of slaves is not regarded as an offence. The rape of a slave woman is not regarded as an offence."

Legal cases involving the transfer of slaves, including marriages, gifts and disputes were adjudicated by a qadi. During the colonial period, qadis were sometimes assisted in their decisions by Italian consular officials. According to locally applied interpretations of the sharia, a concubine who bore a child from her master or aborted a pregnancy could no longer be sold, pledged, or given away, although her other obligations to the master remained intact. In practice, this marked a transition from a marketable slave to a more permanent and domestically integrated position within the household, frequently involving a closer personal relationship with the master. Although remaining legally unfree and dependent, such women became increasingly integrated into the society in which they lived, assuming roles as mothers, lovers, and service providers. Unless they escaped, were abducted, or were unlawfully sold again, (all of these outcomes being documented in historical sources) their futures were generally tied to the social environment in which they had been made pregnant.

== Female Participation ==
Slaves were also owned by Somali women. A document dated back to 1575 describes a woman from Mogadishu freeing her slave. 19th century records from Barawa highlight the fact that women owned a large number of slaves. Court cases document women donating their slaves. A census describes a mistress whose 14-year-old male slave paid her 3 besa per day. In Luuq, some women were served by slaves. Freeborn women of the family had authority over slaves, who performed tasks such as fetching firewood and water or cooking. Qadi court records suggest that women, like men, frequently manumitted their slaves. Freedwomen were often identified by the name of the person responsible for their emancipation, regardless of whether the former owner was male or female. One documented case refers to a woman, Mana Ado bint Bakar, who granted freedom to a female slave whom she had also named Mana Ado.

According to Italian records, women in the city of Barawa relied on Bantu slaves for daytime chores:

"The women of Barawa are very secluded, following Arab custom, they do not leave the house except late in the evening, and for all outdoor tasks during the day they make use of Swahili slaves."

== Religious Justifications ==
Early Italian colonial attempts to abolish slavery largely failed, as the Somalis argued that Islamic law gave them the right to hold slaves.

Somali scholar Ali Jimale Ahmed argued that slave raids against the Oromo were framed as jihad, and that masters were religiously expected to convert enslaved people to Islam. Somalis frequently referred to raids on Oromo settlements as jihad. The British explorer John Speke recorded that the Somalis believed the slave trade to be their Quranic right. Catherine Besteman also notes that, in the Somali context, slave owners were expected to ensure the conversion of enslaved people to Islam.

According to Vittorio Bottego, slaves weren't forcefully converted and were allowed to keep their faith :

"Some of the slaves are Muslim, others idolaters or fetish worshippers; the latter are not forced to abjure their faith; however, almost all are subjected to the environment and voluntarily convert to the religion of Muhammad."

On describing the Somalis, the Italian Gustavo Chiesi wrote:

"The Somalis, belonging to the orthodox Shafi'i sect (followers of Imam al-Shafi'i), are entitled to four lawful wives, as well as whatever number of concubines (surriya), generally drawn from among slave women, whose maintenance they are able to provide.. Each wife thinks of her own children, her chickens, her goats, almost pretending to ignore the man's relationships with other legitimate wives or slaves."

== Enslavement of Ethnic Somalis ==
According to the Somali scholar Ahmed Samatar, the historiography provides little evidence of Somalis being enslaved. Among Somalis, enslaving a fellow Somali was long regarded as a deeply entrenched customary taboo. The only documented case occurred when Muhammad ibn Abdullah Hassan’s enemies bitterly accused him of capturing their women. According to Herman Jeremias Nieboer, a Somali could never become the slave of another Somali, and prisoners of war were not enslaved. Italian scholar Enrico Cerulli observed that Somali customary law differed from Oromo law in that it forbade the enslavement or sale of fellow Somalis under any circumstances. According to Francesca Declich, slaves in Somalia were understood to be foreigners by definition.

As longtime free Muslims, Somalis could not be enslaved in the Islamic world. In Arabia, the kidnapping or enslavement of Somalis was strictly prohibited and punished as piracy on the grounds that Somalis were by nature free and belonged to an "unenslaveble" race. An Ethiopian ex-slave in the early 20th century recounted being taken from Zanzibar and offered for sale in Oman, where nobody dared to buy him as he was mistaken to be a Somali. According to Edward Alpers, Somalis rarely figured in the slave trade as captives.

Colonel Charles Henry Rigby, British Consul at Zanzibar, is cited as having stated that:

"The Somalis being Mohaminedans could not be made slaves, therefore they had not the same reason for distrusting strangers."

In 1876, Sir George Campbell is quoted as having said:

"May I be permitted to speak about the case of who are popularly called slaves, Africans, or are there any others who are called slaves? There are Galla slaves and Abyssinians. I have not known an instance of a half-bred Arab being a slave. Are the Somalis ever slaves? Very rarely. The Somalis steal slaves, but I have never seen a Somali slave, there may, however, be rare instances."

== Abolition ==
=== Impact of abolitionism in the 19th century ===
In the last decades of the 19th century, due to increased restrictions imposed by European powers on slave trading along the coast, more enslaved women were retained as concubines by the Somalis in the interior. During the abolition period, slave exports from southern Somalia to Arabia had to be diverted to the small port of Burgabo, as it remained unguarded by both the Italians and the British. The abolition of slavery initially represented a shock to the local economy, mainly to the slave traders and slave owners. In Zeila, prohibitions against human trafficking in the second half of the 19th century led to “daredevil smuggling” and a sharp increase in slave prices, which in turn increased profits for slave traders. According to Gustavo Chiesi (1909), as a result of the Italian ban on slave imports and slave trading along the coast, the slave population in the interior was increasing. He wrote that landowners in riverine areas encouraged the growth of enslaved populations through forced unions, as a way to maintain and expand their labour force.

=== Italian colonial government ===
Despite the Brussels conference of 1890 where the colonial apowers abolished the legal status of slavery in the colonies, the slave trade in Somalia continued unabated. From 1893, the Italian colonial authorities in Somalia did not recognize the legal status of slavery and slaves were thus legally free to leave their owners, but the Italians often returned fugitive slaves to their owners. After pressure from humanitarians, the Italians officially banned the slave trade and declared that all slaves born after 1890 were legally free. The abolition of slavery in Italian Somaliland was carried out through a series of decrees issued between 1897 and 1907.

In 1893, a shocking report revealed that the Italian government had failed to adhere to the signed obligations of 1890 :

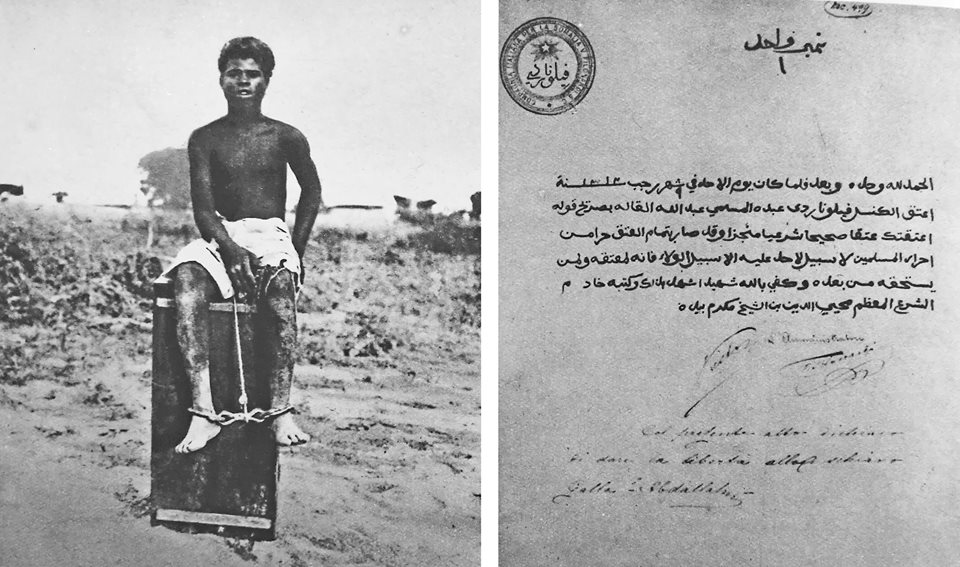
Abdallah al-Galla, an Oromo man who became the first slave freed in by the Italians in 1893.

"The administration handed fugitive slaves from the interior to those who claimed to own them, and sometimes with cruelty, imprisoning and chastising them before consigning them to those who came to claim them, in open contravention of the explicit directions of the Brussels Act. It was found convenient to call slavery domestic. Records of the purchase and sale of slaves, their succession to new owners, their transfer, mortgage and pawning were inscribed in the records of the Qadi Courts. All of this was done without the government in Rome or the Royal Commissioner Sorrentino."

The first 45 slaves were freed by the Italian colonial administration in 1895. In March 1895, new regulations were issued for the administration of the Italian protectorate. The regulations prohibited the slave trade and provided for the gradual abolition of what was termed domestic servitude. However, the decree did not immediately abolish slavery itself, allowing existing slaveholding arrangements to persist while prohibiting the buying and selling of slaves. Under the regulations, judicial matters continued to be administered by qadis in accordance with the sharia.

In 1896, Italians tried to forcibly confiscate the slaves of the Somalis but failed, and top colonial administrator Antonio Cecchi was killed during the military expedition in the interior. The Somalis resisted abolition, arguing that Islamic law allowed them to hold slaves. Somali religious leaders denounced Italian orders, insisting that Somali law, based on the Quran and the Prophet, took precedence over colonial regulations. After this, Governor Emilio Dulio set aside the issue of slavery to avoid further damaging relations with Somali tribes, fearing that action against slavery would provoke revolt.

The anti-slavery decrees announced by the Italians in the 1890s caused a new wave of runaway slaves, in Gustavo Chiesi's account:

"Indeed, as soon as news of the ordinance issued by the government spread beyond the coastal dunes and reached the riverine regions, slaves began to flee with increasing frequency, in an alarming and ever-growing wave. Every day, enslaved people arrived in Mogadishu, Barawa, and Merka after escaping from the interior, seeking the protection and assistance which the government decree, reaching them perhaps in exaggerated form through rumor, had led them to expect. These unfortunate people came to the coast in the hope of obtaining their freedom and of no longer being imprisoned or returned to their masters, as had previously been the case. The situation became increasingly serious, both because of the growing number of fugitives and because of the resentment spreading among the tribes when the Governor and the Residents, aware of public opinion in Italy and bound by the provisions of the General Act of Brussels, refused to return the runaways. Instead, slave owners were offered financial compensation ranging from forty to sixty thalers, depending on the age and physical condition of the fugitive. At first, the owners accepted the compensation, hoping to use the money to acquire replacements in the interior slave markets. However, enslaved people were becoming scarcer in those markets, and increased demand drove up prices. The compensation paid by the government was therefore insufficient to replace the labour lost when slaves fled from the plantations and farms. Supported by tribal leaders, the owners eventually rejected the compensation and instead demanded the unconditional return of their slaves. At the same time, in an effort to prevent further escapes, they placed slaves in irons, increased surveillance, and treated more harshly those suspected of planning escapes or encouraging others to flee."

He further describes slavery as still ongoing in the interior:

"The Somali populations, who, through racial pride nourished by fanatical and fanciful interpretations of the Quran, despise all manual labor and equally despise the Galla populations, who are non-Muslim but idolatrous, have made slavery, regardless of origin and race, their principal means of existence. Agricultural work, cultivation, the care of livestock, all manual labor is carried out by slaves, men and women, while the masters attend to trade in goods at the markets, travel between the places where they keep their wives, or spend entire days conversing with friends. The inland Somalis cannot imagine the possibility of any cultivation of the land or other manual work without the labor of slaves, nor do they yet accept that other men could dedicate themselves to such work unless they are slaves, that is, beings over whom, either by the laws of the Quran, or by customs established over centuries, or by the right acquired by the buyer over purchased merchandise, the master has unlimited power. On this conviction, deeply rooted in the Somali spirit, there can be no doubt. Whoever has visited that people cannot fail to realize this."

Italy's position on the protection of enslaved fugitives remained that such people would not be handed back to their owners, however, in a letter from 1900, Italian Governor Emilio Dulio reported that fugitive slaves were sometimes returned to their owners, particularly in cases involving domestic servants, on the condition that they would not be mistreated. By the end of the 19th century, the social and economic system in Somalia was still largely based on slavery. The Italian administrators in Somalia at the turn of the century did nothing to discourage slavery. In fact, several Italian administrators, including the royal commissioner, purchased female slaves from the Somalis to be used as concubines. By 1903, nearly half of Mogadishu's 7000 population was enslaved, as well as one third of Barawa's population and one fifth of Marka's population. In 1904, only a few hundred slaves had been manumitted since the arrival of the Italians. From 1905 to 1908, the colonial government negotiated the freedom of 2300 slaves, however these ex-slaves were told to remain in their master's homes as servants.

In March 1902, Governor Emilio Dulio argued that slavery could not be immediately abolished, as such a measure would likely provoke unrest among much of the Somali population. As an alternative, he advocated replacing slave labour with oxens, an approach that largely failed. By the end of 1902, articles in newspapers were reporting about the tolerance of slavery by the Italian authorities in Somalia. Under the administration, slaves that escaped were returned by the Italians to their masters or put in jail and forgotten about, in clear violation of the Brussels Conference of 1890. One contract, for example, concerned the sale of two female slaves purchased for 135 thalers by the sons of Sheikh, with 2 thalers paid as taxes to the Italian administration for the registration of the act. It was subsequently revealed that Italian authorities had from the very beginning reached informal understandings with the Somali tribes according to which the export of slaves by sea was prohibited, but slavery itself remained unaffected, as can be inferred from a statement made on 17 November 1903 by the Sultan of the Geledi. According to the Italian journalist Gustavo Chiesi, while the Italian Lieutenant Commander Mannini was resident in Barawa, some Bimal Somalis came to him claiming the return of a slave woman who had fled from them to a certain Songollo which refused to hand her back. Mannini then sent eight askari, under the command of a sergeant, to summon Songollo and request that he return the woman.

In September 1902, Igino Badolato, the Italian Resident at the city of Merka, observed that:

"Nothing is being done here, and no one wants to do anything. Slavery is still at its zenith."

The scandal of 1902 was further aggravated by reports sent by Robecchi Bricchetti, who had exposed that contracts for the sale of slaves were duly authenticated and kept in the residence of the governor. The situation and pressure of public opinion forced the governor to issue special measures. On 2 March 1903, he issued an order prohibiting the slave trade, followed on 12 March 1903 by a circular letter to the residents requesting the application of a number of anti-slavery decrees adopted by the Sultan of Zanzibar. On 20 April 1903, he issued an order establishing special tribunals to decide all questions relating to slavery. A key mistake of the Italian government was the weak oversight of its officials. Funds that could have been used to address the slave trade were instead spent on a ship to navigate the Shabelle river, which was in fact non-navigable. According to the Italian historian Ludovica De Courten: "slavery was still a widespread business and justice was administered by corrupted qadì."

In February 1903, Somali elders interviewed in the city of Barawa revealed that Italian workers purchased the freedom of enslaved women in exchange for sexual favours, they had also affirmed that slaves had been brought into the city as early as the year prior with the knowledge and assistance of Italian authorities. In December 1903, around twenty Oromo women, some of whom were slaves asking for manumission certificates, went to the Italian colonial government offices to request permission to accompany a caravan from Barawa to Bardera. The Italian officials denied them the certificates on the grounds that caravans were forbidden to travel with women and that such women could only have one intention; to practice prostitution. The women wanted to travel closer to their own original homelands in Oromia, where they had been caught as slaves. The Italian officials rejected their petition again on the grounds that the Oromo-speaking area was continuously being raided by Somali slave traders and therefore unsafe. Italian explorer Lamberto Vannutelli also recounts meeting Oromo and Sidama slaves at Luuq who had begged for his help to escape from the Somalis and return to Ethiopia, though the exact number of captives he encountered remains unclear. In 1903, almost half of Mogadishu's population was made up of slaves or freed slaves. A few years later, a U.S. diplomat wrote that much of the slave-raiding still taking place in East Africa was said to occur in the Oromo country.

In 1902, Pestalozza asserted that "slavery, and even less the slave trade, does not exist in the districts of Banadir." However, the following year, he claimed to have uncovered registers documenting transactions involving slaves, including their sale and donation. In 1902, following the publication in the Italian newspaper Secolo of a facsimile of a slave sale contract, the governor of Banadir, Emilio Dulio, wrote to Pestalozza denouncing the document as a forgery, claiming that that a qadi had been forced to supply the document with false names invented by an Italian functionary called Sala. In 1904, a scandal broke out when a concubine committed suicide rather than consent to sexual relations with a prominent Italian officer. It was later reported that he had frequently sought sexual favours from enslaved women through their masters. In 1906, the Italians did free slaves in urban territories via compensation to the masters, but did not act to free slaves in the interior of the country and in fact tried to stop the wave of fugitives who left their owners as news of the Italian emancipation reached the rural interior. Italian anti-slavery measures eventually led to a revolt by the Bimal Somalis. From April 1904 to January 1905, the Bimal besieged Merka, which was supplied by sea whenever monsoon conditions permitted. The Italians eventually suppressed the uprising after reinforcing their troops, whose rifles gave them a military advantage. By the end of the siege, approximately 1200 had died from starvation or scurvy. On 5 March 1905, a peace agreement was signed at Eyl in northern Somalia between Italy and the Dervish State, which included a ban on the slave trade. In 1905, slavery was formally outlawed, but in practice remained widely tolerated. In May 1906, a new decree prohibited freed slaves from leaving the colony, followed in July 1907 by another decree establishing "servant" villages. The distinction between slaves and servants was largely in name only, the Italian authorities had made little effort to investigate whether cases involved legitimate servitude or slavery. In 1909, the Italian journalist Gustavo Chiesi revealed that Italian men paid Somali masters to have sexual relations with their concubines. He had also revealed that many of the indigenous Somalis in the service of the colonial administration such as the interpreters and qadis had female slaves at their disposal. Chiesi also accused the Filonardi Company, who managed the ports of Banadir from 1893 to 1896, of having tolerated slavery and of promising the Somali that they would use a judicial system based on the sharia.

By 1910, the colonial government was reluctant to free all the slaves in Somalia because freeing all the slaves at once would force the free Somalis, unaccustomed to working their own field, to abandon them and resume the nomadic way of life, which the Italians did not want to happen. In 1910, the number of freed slaves had risen to several thousands. By 1916, the general governor of Italian Somaliland, Giovanni Cerrina Feroni, estimated that about one-tenth of the colony's population were still slaves, roughly 300,000 out of 3 million. According to Ronald Segal, Italy's Benadir Company was openly collaborating with local slave dealers, and wealthy Somali merchants still owned slaves by in the first half of the 20th century. The Italians adopted a conciliatory approach toward slave owners in the interior. Colonial tribunals often encouraged slaves to reach agreements with their masters as a condition for freedom, leading many to remain as dependent client laborers rather than slaves.

In the early 1900s, the Italian journalist Gustavo Chiesi recorded the following response from a Somali when asked about the abolition of slavery:

"We cannot do without slaves. They are our life. They are our hands, our eyes, our strength. They cultivate our lands, sow our seeds, harvest our crops, and tend our livestock. How can we manage without them? The land will remain uncultivated and overgrown with brush. Seed will no longer be cast into the furrows. The waters of the river will flood the fields unchecked. No one will gather the harvest. Our customs and laws do not permit us to perform such manual labour. And even if we wished to do so, we could not, for we do not have enough arms. Likewise, the slave women, who are like our daughters, grind the sorghum and maize from which bread is made to feed the whole family, they carry the water from which everyone drinks, and they make the butter that we take to the markets to be sold across the sea in exchange for the cotton cloth with which we all dress. If you take away the slaves, who will do all this? We are not enough. Without the slaves, men and women, who are our children, we shall have to abandon the country, leave it deserted, and withdraw far away, where it will no longer be possible for you to reach us. We cannot remain here, because we would die of hunger, and our livestock, left untended, would scatter into the bush, for we are not numerous enough to watch over them!"

According to historian Gwyn Campbell:

"However, as in other recently established colonial regimes in Africa, there was no immediate challenge to slavery. Although it was part of the Italian colonial obligation in the Belgium treaty to abolish slavery and the slave trade, Italy's initial concern was to promote efficient colonial administration in Somalia. The issue of slavery was ignored until the administrative structure was strong enough to enforce abolition. Indeed, Italian officials tolerated the maintenance of slavery on the large plantations created by Italian planters on the confiscated land between the Juba and Shebelli rivers, and frequently returned fugitive slaves to their former masters.. slavery throughout the colony was officially outlawed only in the first years of the twentieth century, in response to pressure from other European governments and within Italy from the Italian anti-slavery group led by the abolitionist Robecchi Bricchetti who, through a media campaign in Milan, aroused Italian public opinion against the government's lassitude towards abolition in Somalia."

The Italians reported to the Advisory Committee of Experts on Slavery in the 1930s that slavery and slave trade in Somalia had now been abolished. Although the Italians freed some Bantus, some Bantu groups remained enslaved well into the 1930s and continued to be despised and discriminated against by large parts of Somali society. Most of the freed slaves went on to work in Italian owned plantation or as client-farmers for Somalis. The Italians regarded Somalis as naturally disinclined toward agricultural labor :

"Hand power in the Benadir is scarce for a complex series of reasons of a moral, economic and demographic kind.. overall there is a natural slothfulness of pure Somalis towards work in the fields. Only slaves and freed slaves practice this dishonourable activity, it is only among them that we gather the small amount of manpower which is available."

While slavery had formally been abolished during the fascist period, in practice it was tolerated and ignored. Contrary to De Vecchi’s claim to Mussolini that slavery had disappeared in Somalia in a letter, it persisted under other forms, and forced labour remained legal and regulated. The abolition of slavery was more a matter of law than of fact. In 1933, Marcello Serrazanetti, the federal secretary of the Fascist Party in Mogadishu and a vocal critic of the new forced labour policies in Somalia, described forced labour as being "cynically disguised" as labour contracts that were, in his view, far worse than slavery. By 1935, the Italians in collaboration with former Somali slave owners introduced coerced labor laws and the forced conscription of the freed slaves in the agricultural industry, with over 100 Italian plantations in the river valleys. The emancipated Bantu were forced to leave their own farms to work solely as farm laborers on plantations owned by the Italian colonial government. In 1937, a law was passed that allowed Italians to keep enslaved concubines. During this period, the Italian colonial regime effectively permitted European settler farmers access to slave labour and even returned fugitive slaves to their owners.

The Italians definitionally separated the ex-slave population from the Somali population for purposes of conscripting laborers. According to Kenyan historian Ahmed Salim, Somali men generally avoided plantation labour due to an aversion to manual labour. During the fascist period, Italian authorities relied on forced labour, as Somali workers were not attracted by monetary wages, which were not yet seen as useful for meeting daily subsistence needs. According to Harold Nelson, during the Italian colonial period the potential labour market was largely composed of sedentary populations who had formerly been enslaved by dominant Somali groups, who showed little interest in agriculture. Almost all the people conscripted into these forced plantations were former slaves or related to former slaves. The colonial government tasked ethnic Somalis with drafting these former slaves under their control to work on plantations. Several demonstrations against conscription took place and many conscripted men fled the estates. As a result, the Italians promised men conscripted into forced labor the right to choose any woman on the plantation as a wife, without her consent. Contemporary informants reported that without the company of a woman, most young men would have fled conscription.

Abuses against conscripts on plantations under the fascist administration were common, as many of the Italians sent to Somalia were violent or corrupt individuals with criminal records. In one documented case, workers who failed to complete assigned labor were punished by being tied to a pole and exposed to the sun for hours. Among descendants of slaves in Somalia, memories of forced labor under the fascist regime often overshadowed earlier memories of slavery in southern Somalia. In local recollections, traumatic memories associated with slavery were largely linked to forced conscriptions in the fascist period. At an Italian-owned plantation known as Avai, numerous Bantu laborers were drowned in the irrigation canals.

The British abolished this system after defeating the Italians in WW2. One British official described the scheme to be indistinguishable from slavery. At least one Italian plantation overseer was later interned by the British in a prison camp in Kenya following the British conquest. Slave labour in Somalia only effectively came to an end with the collapse of Italian colonialism after the Second World War. Traces of it still existed in 1948, on the eve of the United Nations decision to entrust Italy with the fiduciary administration of Somaliland. At the Conference on Somalia, forced labour was specifically raised, and its abolition became one of the conditions for accepting the UN Trusteeship proposal.

=== British colonial government ===
In April 1898, an Oromo slave who had obtained British protection was found and killed by his Somali master. In response, British police confiscated the Somali master's cattle in the Afmadow area. The Somalis retaliated by raiding towards British controlled Kismayo and killing two Arab traders near the town.

As did the Italians, The British government of the East Africa protectorate consistently intervened on the side of the Somalis to maintain the servile status of the Oromo. Despite their official actions, the British clearly recognized that the position of the Oromo living among the Somalis amounted to slavery. Summarizing the situation of Oromos living under the Somalis in 1930, the district commissioner of Garissa District wrote that every Oromo living with the Somalis is virtually a slave and therefore exploitable. To bury the issue, in 1936 the British falsely declared that the Wardey (Oromo slaves) had ceased to exist as an ethnic entity, having been fully assimilated as Somalis. The enslavement of Oromo populations in British controlle southern Somalia continued in the 20th century, because British officers classified Oromo slaves as assimilated Somalis rather than enslaved communities, thereby avoiding the issue of slavery.

Following the killing of a British officer during an expedition in Somaliland and the subsequent British blockade of Berbera, British authorities negotiated a series of treaties with northern Somali clans. In 1855, the British Brigadier-General William Marcus Coghlan, the Resident at Aden, signed a treaty with the Garhajis and Habr Je'lo prohibiting the export of slaves from territories under their authority. During the 1880s, the British concluded additional abolition treaties with the Majerteen (1866), Habr Awal (July 1884), Gadabursi (December 1884), Habr Je'lo (December 1884), Issa (December 1884), Garhajis (January 1885), and Warsangeli (January 1886).

Officially, slavery in Northern Somalia was abolished during the British Somaliland protectorate. However, at the turn of the 20th century, British naval officers routinely ignored orders to police the slave trade, and slave running from the British Somaliland coast went virtually unchecked as a result. Severe infighting among northern Somalis during the Dervish Wars of the 20th century led to the decline of the slave trade, as groups turned on each other instead of carrying out slave raids, contributing to a sharp population decrease in the process.

Things became more difficult for slave merchants when European powers, particularly the British Empire, expanded into the region in the 1880s. The British occupied Zeila in 1884, followed in the same year by the French move on Obock, and in 1885 the Italians seized Massawa. In addition, the Great Ethiopian Famine of 1888-1892 disrupted slave exports. Together, these developments made it increasingly difficult for merchants to export slaves from the northern Somali coast. After suppressing the slave trade on the northern Somali coast, the British promoted commerce in textiles and natural products as an alternative source of trade.

== Life after Enslavement ==
Different members of a Somali clan could have slaves of both Oromo and Bantu heritage, and once these slaves attained their freedom, they and their children could then be affiliated with the same Somali clan, despite their separate origins. In this way, villages formed along Somali clan lines in the Jubba valley could contain people of both Oromo and Bantu heritage, who claimed affiliation to the same Somali clan. One example is Shaikh Hajji Ali bin Isa al-Bimali of Marka, an Oromo ex-slave of the Bimal, despite not being ethnically Somali, he identified himself with the Bimal clan.

Qadi court records indicate that freedwomen sometimes married their former owners or the sons of their former owners. One example is the case of an Oromo freedwoman named Hawa, who had married an Isaaq Somali man in Barawa with a recorded mahr (dower) of 3 qirsh, the lowest recorded amount. More commonly, freedwomen received a mahr of around 10 qirsh, compared to approximately 30-60 qirsh for freeborn women. Former owners and their freed slaves often remained connected through social and economic obligations. In one case, a freedwoman, possibly a former concubine, was sufficiently trusted that upon her patron's death she was found in possession of a large amount of gold and silver, which she subsequently handed over to the guardian of the deceased's minor heirs. In another case, a freed person remained legally tied to their former patron, such that upon the freed person's death, the patron inherited their estate.

After emancipation, Oromos ex-slaves settled in large numbers in the mid-valley area around Buale and the middle Juba region as well as the upper Shabelle. Bantu ex-slaves settled along the Juba and Shabelle rivers, but also the inter-riverine regions of Bay and Bakool.

Some freed female slaves practiced prostitution. Prostitution as a female slave activity was first documented in Somalia by Robecchi Bricchetti. According to records of the Italian parliament, by the 1910s most emancipated individuals were described as living in vagrancy, with many women engaged in prostitution :

"The slave, Swahili, Borana, Galla, Arussi, means by freedom only the right to do nothing. Except for the few who join the freedmen's villages on the Shabelle or Juba Rivers and take up farming on their own, most, if men, turn to idleness and vagrancy; if women, to prostitution. Mogadishu, Merca, and Brava are overflowing with prostitutes, and, with a few exceptions, they are all freed slaves."

In British Somaliland, the administration employed emancipated slaves, the jail master of Zeila under the British was an ex-slave. According to the colonial administrator Major H. Rayne, after the abolition of slavery in British Somaliland, both former slaves and those formerly involved in the slave trade tended to avoid discussing the subject, preferring to keep their past experiences of slavery and emancipation private. In the 20th century, freed slaves were generally held in an unequal and inferior legal status compared to those considered ethnic Somali.

== Discrimination in Modern Somali Society ==
The term “Galla” has been documented in modern contexts as a pejorative exonym for Oromo descended people in Somalia, at times used in association with the legacy of slavery in Somalia. In one recorded instance from the 1990s, a Somali interpreter used the term during an asylum application in the Netherlands to refer to a woman described as descending from formerly enslaved families, reportedly emancipated during the colonial period. Despite adopting Islam, affiliating with Somali clans, and speaking Somali, descendants of Oromo and Bantu slaves in Somalia continue to face discrimination. Somalis commonly refer to these descendants of slaves as "Habash" or "Jareer" meaning kinky hair.

== Slavery in Somali literature ==
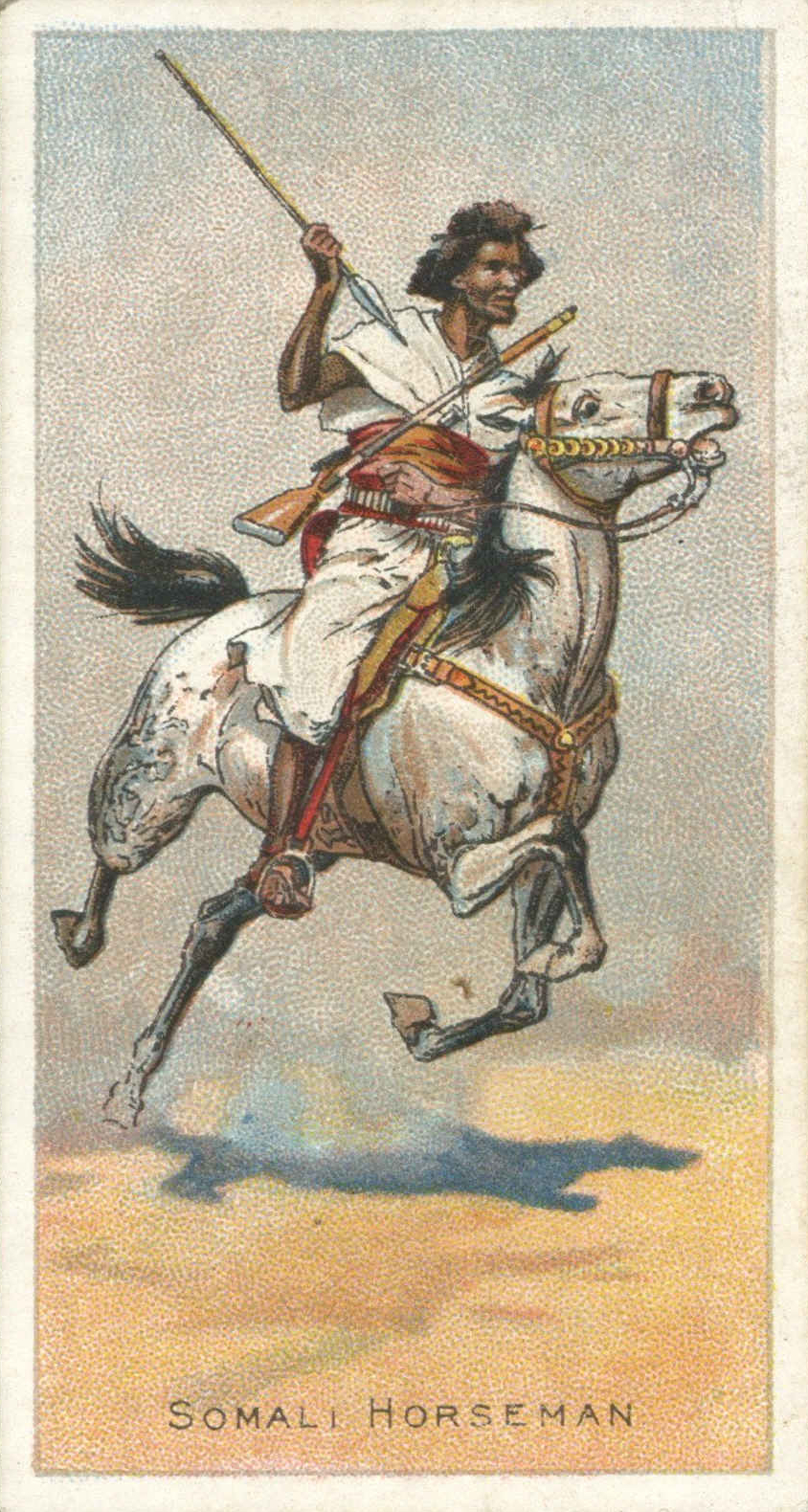
Illustration depicting a Somali horseman, 1905

In the novel Maps (1986) written by the Somali novelist Nuruddin Farah, Misra appears as a major character, an Oromo woman who was separated from her family at a young age and taken by a Somali warrior on horseback to a town where she was acquired by a wealthy man. Upon reaching adulthood, she became his wife and grew increasingly confused by her situation, eventually murdering him during sexual intercourse and fleeing, later becoming the maid and mistress of a man named Qorrax. She eventually adopts Askar, the novel's protagonist, which becomes an important aspect of the narrative.

== Modern Slavery ==
A 2017 investigation by the BBC reported that young Kenyan women from Mombasa, both Christian and Muslim, were being lured and subsequently trafficked by al-Shabaab into Somalia, where they were subjected to sexual slavery. As of 2023, Somalia had around 98,000 people living in modern slavery and ranked 14th in terms of prevalence of modern slavery within Africa.

== See also ==
- Slavery in Kenya
- Slavery in Ethiopia
- Red sea slave trade
- Zanzibar slave trade
- Arab slave trade
- Somali bantu
- Bantu people
- Habesha people
- Oromo people
