= Maurizio Rava =

Italian-Jewish artist, journalist, soldier and politician (1878–1941)

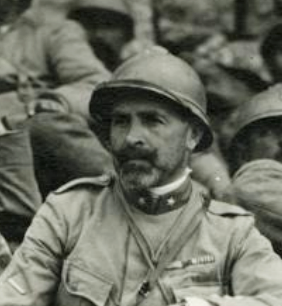
- Rava during World War I

Governor of Italian Somaliland
- In office 1 July 1931 – 6 March 1935
- Preceded by: Guido Corni
- Succeeded by: Rodolfo Graziani

Personal details
- Born: 31 January 1878 Milan, Kingdom of Italy
- Died: 22 January 1941 (aged 62) Rome, Kingdom of Italy
- Party: National Fascist Party
- Other political affiliations: Italian Nationalist Association
- Children: Carlo Enrico Rava
- Education: Accademia di Belle Arti di Roma
- Occupation: Painter; journalist; writer; soldier; politician
- Awards: Medal of Military Valor; Silver; Bronze

Military service
- Allegiance: Kingdom of Italy
- Branch/service: Royal Italian Army; Blackshirts
- Rank: Brigadier general
- Battles/wars: World War I; Italian front; World War II; Western Desert campaign; Operation Compass

Maurizio Rava (31 January 1878 – 22 January 1941) was an Italian-Jewish painter, journalist, writer, soldier and politician. He was a general in the Royal Italian Army, and served as the governor of Italian Somaliland from 1 July 1931 to 6 March 1935.

== Biography ==
Rava's political career began in 1919, when he was co-founder of the Fasci Italiani di Combattimento (predecessor of the National Fascist Party) in Rome. Previously he was a lieutenant during World War I (where he was wounded in combat), and received the Medal of Military Valor three times (one Silver and two Bronze). After 1920 he began a military career in the fascist militias.

In the Italian colonies he became secretary general of the governor's office of Italian Tripolitania with Emilio De Bono in March 1927. He then assumed the governorship of Italian Somaliland from 1931 to 1935. In those years he gave dynamic impetus to agriculture, roads and railways with emphasis on all types of construction in Somalia. In 1933 he promoted the urban remodeling of Mogadishu, which since then began to be called "the white pearl of the Indian Ocean" and became populated with a large minority (40% of the total inhabitants) of Italian settlers.

He was appointed as Senator of the Kingdom upon his return to Italy in 1936.

He became politically marginalized in 1938, after Fascist Italy's alliance with Nazi Germany, due to his Jewish background.

He was also a Blackshirt brigadier general of the Royal Italian Army and died in Rome on 22 January 1941, as a result of wounds received in the Battle of Bardia (in Italian Libya) during Operation Compass, the British offensive of the Western Desert campaign.

== Works ==
Maurizio Rava wrote several books, including:

- Al lago Tsana (il mar profondo d'Etiopia) (published in 1913).
- l'Eritrea; la nostra colonia primogenita (published in 1923).
- Somalia; Parole ai Coloniali (published in 1935).
- Other minor works are: "Ingiustizia delle sanzioni: l’Italia stato aggredito", Rome 1936; "Il problema della mano d’opera in Somalia", Rome 1937; "Ovest etiopico: nei paesi del platino e dell’oro", Rome 1938; "Politica sociale verso gli indigeni e modi di collaborazione con essi", Rome 1938; "Diario di un secondo viaggio nell’ovest etiopico", Rome 1939.

== See also ==
- List of people from Milan
- List of West European Jews

Government offices
Preceded by Guido Corni	Governor of Italian Somaliland; 1931–1935	Succeeded by Rodolfo Graziani
