= Vincenzo Filonardi =

Italian diplomat

Italian Governor of Somaliland
- In office 3 August 1889 – 15 May 1897
- Preceded by: Office Established
- Succeeded by: Emilio Dulio

Personal details
- Born: 23 June 1853 Rome, Papal States
- Died: 17 May 1916 (aged 62) Rome, Kingdom of Italy
- Occupation: Politician, soldier, ambassador, consul

Vincenzo Filonardi (23 June 1853 – 17 May 1916) was an Italian politician and soldier of the Regio Esercito, who was the first governor of Italian Somalia. In 1890, he was also consul of the Kingdom of Italy to Zanzibar.

== Life ==
In 1870, Vincenzo Filonardi, was graduated as a navy captain in Genova.

Later, as Captain Vincenzo Filonardi, he had under his command several ships between Italy and the coasts of Eastern Africa. In the 1880s, he was able to create a successful shipping company between Italy and the Indian Ocean.

In 1890, Filonardi was nominated by the Italian Prime Minister Giovanni Giolitti as a consul and ambassador of Italy at Zanzibar.

From 3 August 1889 to 15 May 1893 Filonardi was the first Governor of Italian Somaliland and was in charge of an Italian company responsible for the administration of the Benadir territory, called Societa' Filonardi.

In southern Somalia, better known as the Banaadir coast, Italy was the main colonizer, but the extension of Italian influence was painstakingly slow owing to parliamentary lack of enthusiasm for overseas territory. Italy acquired its first possession in southern Somalia in 1888 when the Sultan of Hobyo, Keenadiid, agreed to Italian "protection." In the same year, Vincenzo Filonardi, Italy's architect of colonialism in southern Somalia, demanded a similar arrangement from the Majeerteen Sultanate of Ismaan Mahamuud. In 1889 both sultans, suspicious of each other, consented to place their lands under Italian protection. Italy then notified the signatory powers of the Berlin West Africa Conference of 1884-85 of its southeastern Somali protectorate. Later, Italy seized the Banaadir coast proper, which had long been under the tenuous authority of the Zanzibaris, to form the colony of Italian Somaliland E. Nations

After 3 years of "interim" in 1896, he was named commissioner of the Somalia italiana for two years more. He returned to Italy after his "Societa' Filonardi" was closed and was created the Societa' Benadir, from which was later politically created Italian Somaliland, in 1905.

Filonardi moved to live in Rome in 1913, meanwhile he wrote books (like "Considerazioni sulla Somalia Italiana" and "Poche osservazioni sul mercato di Zanzibar e sull'opportunità di crearvi un consolato italiano") until his death in 1916.

Preceded by Title unexisting	Governor of Italian Somaliland; 3 August 1889 – 15 May 1893	Succeeded by Vacant
Preceded by Vacant	Governor of Italian Somaliland; 1896–1897	Succeeded by Emilio Dulio

== Bibliography ==
- L. De Courten. L'amministrazione coloniale italiana del Benadir. Dalle compagnie commerciali alla gestione statale (1889-1914), in "Storia contemporanea, IX". Roma, 1978

== See also ==
- List of colonial governors of Italian Somaliland
- Somalia Italiana
- Benadir
