= Emilio Dulio =

Italian politician

Emilio Dulio (21 May 1859 – 17 May 1950) was an Italian politician. He was twice colonial governor of Italian Somaliland (1897, 1898–1905).

Preceded by Vincenzo Filonardi	Italian Governor of Somaliland; 1897	Succeeded by Giorgio Sorrentino
Preceded by Giorgio Sorrentino	Italian Governor of Somaliland; 1898–1905	Succeeded by Luigi Mercatelli

== Bibliography ==
- Marco Scardigli (1995). "Il provinciale d'Africa. Il Benadir e l'epistolario di Emilio Dulio (1885-1903)". Studi Piacentini. pp. 201–257.
- Gustavo Chiesi; Ernesto Travelli (1904). Le questioni del Benadir. Milan: Bellini.
- Vanni Beltrami (2011). Italia d'oltremare. Storie dei territori italiani dalla conquista alla caduta. Rome: Edizioni Nuova Cultura. ISBN 9788861347021.
- Jon Kalb (2001). Adventures in the Bone Trade: The Race to Discover Human Ancestors in Ethiopia's Afar Depression. New York: Copernicus Books. ISBN 9781475788211.
