= List of colonial governors of Eritrea =

Eritrea was under foreign rule for much of its modern history. It was first colonized by Italy in 1890 and remained an Italian colony until 1941, when British forces took control during World War II. From 1941 to 1952, Eritrea was administered as a British protectorate before being federated with Ethiopia in 1952 under a United Nations resolution. In 1962, Ethiopia formally annexed Eritrea, leading to a decades-long struggle for independence, which was finally achieved in 1993.

This article provides a list of the colonial governors until 1991.

== List of Provincial, Colonial and Federal Heads of Eritrea ==
(Dates in italics indicate de facto continuation of office.)

== List of rulers ==
=== List of Ottoman governors of Egypt (1517–1805) ===
- List of Ottoman governors of Egypt

=== List of Grand Viziers of Egypt (1857–1878) ===
- Zulfiqar Pasha (1857–1858) (1st term)
- Mustafa Naili (1858–1861)
- Zulfiqar Pasha (1861–1864) (2nd term)
- Raghib Pasha (1864–1866) (1st term)
- Muhammad Sharif Pasha (1866–1867) (1st term)
- Raghib Pasha (1867–1868) (2nd term)
- Muhammad Sharif Pasha (1868–1872) (2nd term)
- Nubar Pasha (1872)
- Muhammad Tawfiq Pasha (1872–1878)

=== Habesh Eyaleti (Ottoman Province of Habesh) / Massawa Province ===
Wali = Governor

Portrait	Term	Incumbent	Notes
	Massawa	Ottoman Province	
	1687 – 1663	Keki Abdi Pasha, Na’ib of Arkiko, Wali of Massawa	Na’ib of Arkiko, Wali of Massawa
	1693–1693	Mehmed Pasha	
	1693–1964	Abaza Mustafa Pasha	
	1694— 1695	Misirli Mehmed Pasha	
	1695–1965	Gümrükçü Süleyman Pasha	
	1793	Ahmad Hasan	Na’ib of Arkiko, Wali of Massawa
	1813 to 1826	Idris bin Utman	Na’ib of Arkiko, Wali of Massawa
	Egyptian occupation	Egypt itself nominally within Ottoman Empire	
	1690 to 1720	Amir bin Ali	
	1770 to 1773	Hasan Amir	
	1773 to 1787	Muhammad Amir	
	1787 to 1800	Uthman Amir	
	1800 to 1813	Idris bin Uthman	
	1813 to 1833	Turkci Bilmaz	Na’ib of Arkiko
	1833 to 1840	Yahya Ahmad	
	1840 to 1844	Muhammad Yahya	Na’ib of Arkiko
	1844 to 1845	Hasan Idris	Na’ib of Arkiko
	1845 to 1846	Muhammad Amir	Na’ib of Arkiko
	1846 to 1848	Idris Hasan	Na’ib of Arkiko
Ottoman Suzerainty			
	1848 to 1863	Rustam Agha,	Wali of Massawa
Egyptian Province			
	1866 to 1867	Ismail Haqqi	
	1867 to 1867	Omar Agha	
	1867 to 1869	Ibrahim Pasha	
	1869 to 1869	Muhammad Rasikh Bey (born c. 1834 – died 1883)	
	1869 to 1869	Abdallah Halil Efendi	
	1869 to 1870	Hasan Bey Rifat	
	1870 to 1870	Abdalkadir	
	1870 to 1871	Aladdin Pasha Siddiq, Wali of Massawa	
	1871 to 1871	Ahmad Mumtaz Pasha (at Sawakin) (born 1825 – died 1874)	
	1871 to 1871	Hajj Aman	
	1871 to 1871	Ala al-Din Pasha Siddiq (d. 1883)	(1st time)
	1871 to 1873	Werner Munzinger, Wali of Massawa, then Governor-General of the Eastern Sudan and the Red Sea Coast until November 1875	
	1873 to 1874	Johann Albert Werner (born 1832 – died 1875)	
	1874 to 1874	Munzinger Pasha	
	1874 to November 1875	Arakel Bey Abroyan (born 1832 – died 1875)	
	1875 to 1876	Uthman Rifiq Pasha (born 1839 – died 1886)	
	1876 to 1879	Mohammed Ratib Pasha	
	1879 to 1882	Khurshid Bey Pertev	
	December 1882 to 28 June 1882	Giulio Pestalozza, Commandant	
	1882 to December 1882	Hursid Bey Pertev, Wali of Massawa	
	1883 to 1884	Muhammad Muhtar Pasha, Wali of Massawa. (born 1835 – died 1897)	
	1884	Mason Bey, Wali of Massawa	
	1884 to 1884	William Nathan Wrighte Hewett (born 1834 – died 1888)	Acting governor of Massawa (made the British Protectorate over this province reality)
	1884 to 1885	Izzet Bey, Wali of Massawa	
Italian Civil Commissioners of Assab			
	1885 to 1885	Giuseppe Sapeto (commercial agent) (born 1811 – died 1895)	
	1885 to 1885	Giovanni Branchi (born 1842 – died 1928)	
Italian Suzerainty			
	1885 to 1885	Marcopoli Bey, Commandant	
	5 February 1885 to 6 February 1885	Franz Hassen Bey, Commandant	
	1885 to 1885	Charles Rigolet (born c. 1853 – died ....)	
	February 1885 to 14 November 1885	Tancredi Saletta, Commandant	
	5 December 1885 to 22 April 1887	Vittorio Dabormida, Superior Commandant	
	22 April 1887 to 10 November 1887	Tancredi Saletta	2nd Term
	November 1887 to 1888	Alessandro Asinari di San Marzano	
Assab Protectorate			
	1888 to 1888	Carlo De Amezaga (born 1835 – died 1899)	
	1888 to 1888	Giovanni Galeazzo Frigerio	Giovanni Galeazzo Frigerio (born 1841 – died 1921)
	1888 to 20 December 1889	Antonio Baldissera	
	20 December 1889 to 20 December 1889	Giulio Pestalozza (born 1850 – died 1930)	
	20 December 1889 to 1 January 1890	Baldassarre Orero, Commandan	

=== Eritrea ===
Before the official creation of Italian Eritrea (Colonia Eritrea) in 1890, the territory had seven interim governors: Giovanni Branchi (1882 to 1885), Alessandro Caimi (1885), Tancredi Saletta (1885), Matteo Albertone (1886 to 1887), Tancredi Saletta (1887), Alessandro Di San Marzano (1888) and Antonio Baldissera (1889).

Complete list of Italian Governors of Eritrea:

Tenure	Portrait	Incumbent	Notes
Commandants of Massawa
1885 to 1885		Pietro Caimi (born 1830 – died 1886)	
1885 to 1886		Tancredi Saletta (1st time) (born 1843 – died 1909)	
1886 to 1886		Carlo Gené (superior commandant) (born 1836 – died 1890)	
1886 to 1887		Antonio Baldissera (born 1838 – died 1917)	
1887 to 1890		Alessandro Asinari di San Marzano (born 1830 – died 1906)	
Italian Eritrea Colony
1 January 1890 to 30 June 1890		Baldassarre Orero, Commandant	
30 June 1890 to 28 February 1892		Antonio Gandolfi, Commandant	
28 February 1892 to 22 February 1896		Oreste Baratieri, Commandant	Commander of the Royal Italian Army in the Battle of Adwa
22 February 1896 to 16 December 1897		Antonio Baldissera, Governor	
16 December 1897 to 25 March 1907		Ferdinando Martini, Governor	
25 March 1907 to 17 August 1915		Giuseppe Salvago Raggi, Governor	
17 August 1915 to 16 September 1916		Giovanni Cerrina Feroni, acting Governor	1st term
16 September 1916 to 20 July 1919		Giacomo De Martino, Governor	
20 July 1919 to 20 November 1920		Camillo de Camillis, Governor	
20 November 1920 to 14 April 1921		Ludovico Pollera, Governor	
14 April 1921 to 1 June 1923		Giovanni Cerrina Feroni, Governor	2nd term
1 June 1923 to 1 June 1928		Jacopo Gasparini, Governor	
1 June 1928 to 11 July 1930		Corrado Zoli, Governor	
11 July 1930 to 15 January 1935		Riccardo Astuto dei Duchi di Lucchesi, Governor	
15 January 1935 to 18 January 1935		Ottone Gabelli, acting Governor	
18 January 1935 to 22 November 1935		Emilio De Bono, Governor	
22 November 1935 to 22 May 1936		Pietro Badoglio, Governor	
Eritrea Governorate
Part of Italian East Africa
1 June 1936 to 1 April 1937		Alfredo Guzzoni, Governor	
1 April 1937 to 15 December 1937		Vincenzo De Feo, Governo	
15 December 1937 to 2 June 1940		Giuseppe Daodice, Governor	
2 June 1940 to 19 May 1941		Luigi Frusci,	

From 1936, the colony of Eritrea was increased in size and called Eritrea Governorate, as part of Africa Orientale Italiana (AOI). The Italian governors were under direct orders of the Viceroy (representing the now-King and Emperor Vittorio Emanuele)

== List of Chief Executives of Eritrea (1941–1960) ==
Portrait	Incumbent	Term	Notes
		British Administration	
	Sir William Platt, Administrator	5 February 1941 to 4 May 1942	Brian Kennedy-Cooke British Deputy Chief Political Officer for Eritrea 1941–1942
	Stephen Hemsley Longrigg, Administrator	4 May 1942 to 9 November 1944	
	C.D. McCarthy, Administrator	9 November 1944 to 14 August 1945	
	John Meredith Benoy, Administrator	14 August 1945 to 1 November 1946	
	Francis Greville Drew, Administrator	1 November 1946 to 19 February 1951	
		UN High Commissioner in Eritrea	
	Eduardo Anze Matienzo (born 1902 – died 1979) Non-party	19 February 1951 to 15 September 1952	United Nations Transitional Administration in Eritrea
		Chief Administrator	
	Duncan Cameron Cumming, Chief Administrator	19 February 1951 to 15 September 1952	
	Tedla Bairu,	15 September 1952 to 29 July 1955	Chief Executive
	Asfaha Woldemikael,	8 August 1955 to December 1959	Chief Executive
	Abiye Abebe,	December 1959 to 20 May 1960 20 May 1960 to 14 November 1962	Chief Executive, Administrator

=== Eritrea Governor-General ===
Portrait	Incumbent	Term	
	Ethiopian Province		
	Abiye Abebe,	14 November 1962 to 1964	Governor-General
	Ras Asrate Medhin Kassa	1964 to December 1970	Governor-General
	Debebe Hailemariam	December 1970 to August 1974	Governor-General
	Amanuel Amde Mikael,	August 1974 to 29 May 1975	Governor-General
	Getachew Nadew (d. 1977)	17 Feb 1975 – Jun 1977	Governor-General
	Fikru Woldetinsae	Jun 1977 – 1979	Governor-General
	Dawit Wolde Giorgis,	1979 to 1983	14 NovemberGovernor-General
	Afework Wolemikael,	August 1989 to 18 May 1991	Governor-General
	Tesfaye Gebre Kidan,	August 1989 to 29 May 1991	14 NovemberGovernor-General

== See also ==
  - List of heads of state of Eritrea
  - Chief Executive of Eritrea
- Lists of office-holders
