= Cesare Spighi =

Italian engineer and architect

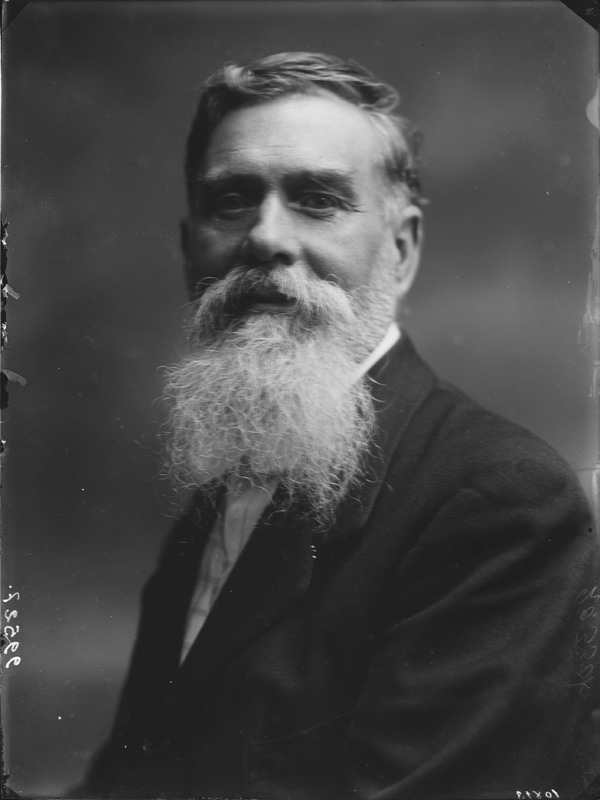
Cesare Spighi

Cesare Spighi (April 23, 1854 - 1929) was an Italian engineer and architect.

Spighi was born and died in Florence. He made his first studies at the Istituto Tecnico Provinciale of Florence; from there he moved to Pisa, followed by studies at the Academy of Fine Arts of Florence, where he obtained various prizes. After exiting the academy, he worked in the studio of the engineers Comparini, Calderini, and Micheli, and alongside professor Giuseppe Castellazzi, he took part in the restoration of the church of Santa Trinita. A Ministry of Florence commissioned from him a study to enlarge the Laurentian Library, but the government was limited in funds for projects. He competed unsuccessfully in the first legs of the contest to design a monument to Vittorio Emanuele II in Rome, which ultimately led to the Altare della Patria.

He pursued various projects for the reordering of central Florence; one of these projects was presented in 1888 to the Commune, but not pursued. He was nominated as architect for the Royal Commission for the Conservation of Tuscan Monuments. Among his designs in Florence and surroundings, are included the Villino del conte Daudini on Viale Prince Eugenio and the Villino Rosai at the Barriera delle Cure.

He also designed the Villa Renatico-Martini (1887), now a museum but originally built for the fascist writer Ferdinando Martini (1841-1928) in Monsummano Terme, near Pistoia. He also completed a monument to Ugo Foscolo, and two cemeteries in San Piero in Bagno in Emilia-Romagna near Forlì. He also designed the church in San Piero in Bagno, and played a role in its urban planning. Spighi was elected consigliere comunale for the city of Florence, and assessor of public works. He served also as President of the various Civil Societies in Florence, associate of various Academies, and Secretary at the Artist's Circle (a society of artists). He was instructor in architecture at the Institute of Fine Arts in Florence. He was Knighted into the Order of the Crown of Italy.
