= List of colonial governors of Italian Eritrea =

Governor of Italian Eritrea
- Governatore della Eritrea italiana
- Coat of arms of Italian Eritrea

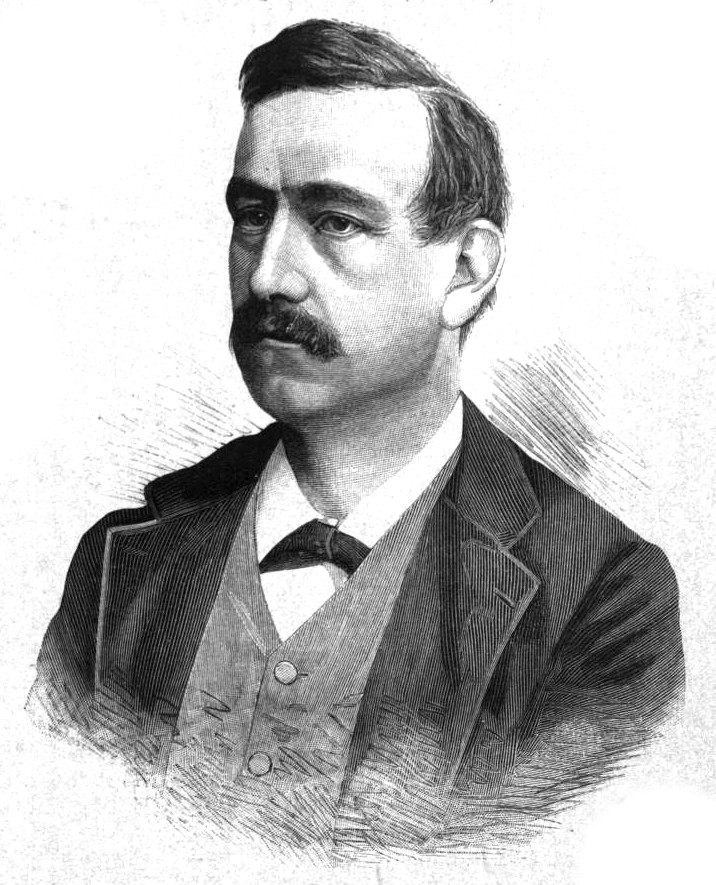
- Longest serving Ferdinando Martini; 16 December 1897 – 25 March 1907
- Reports to: King of Italy; Governor-General of Italian East Africa (after 1936)
- Residence: Governor's Palace, Asmara
- Formation: 1 January 1890
- First holder: Baldassarre Orero
- Final holder: Luigi Frusci (acting)
- Abolished: 19 May 1941
- Succession: British military administrators of Eritrea

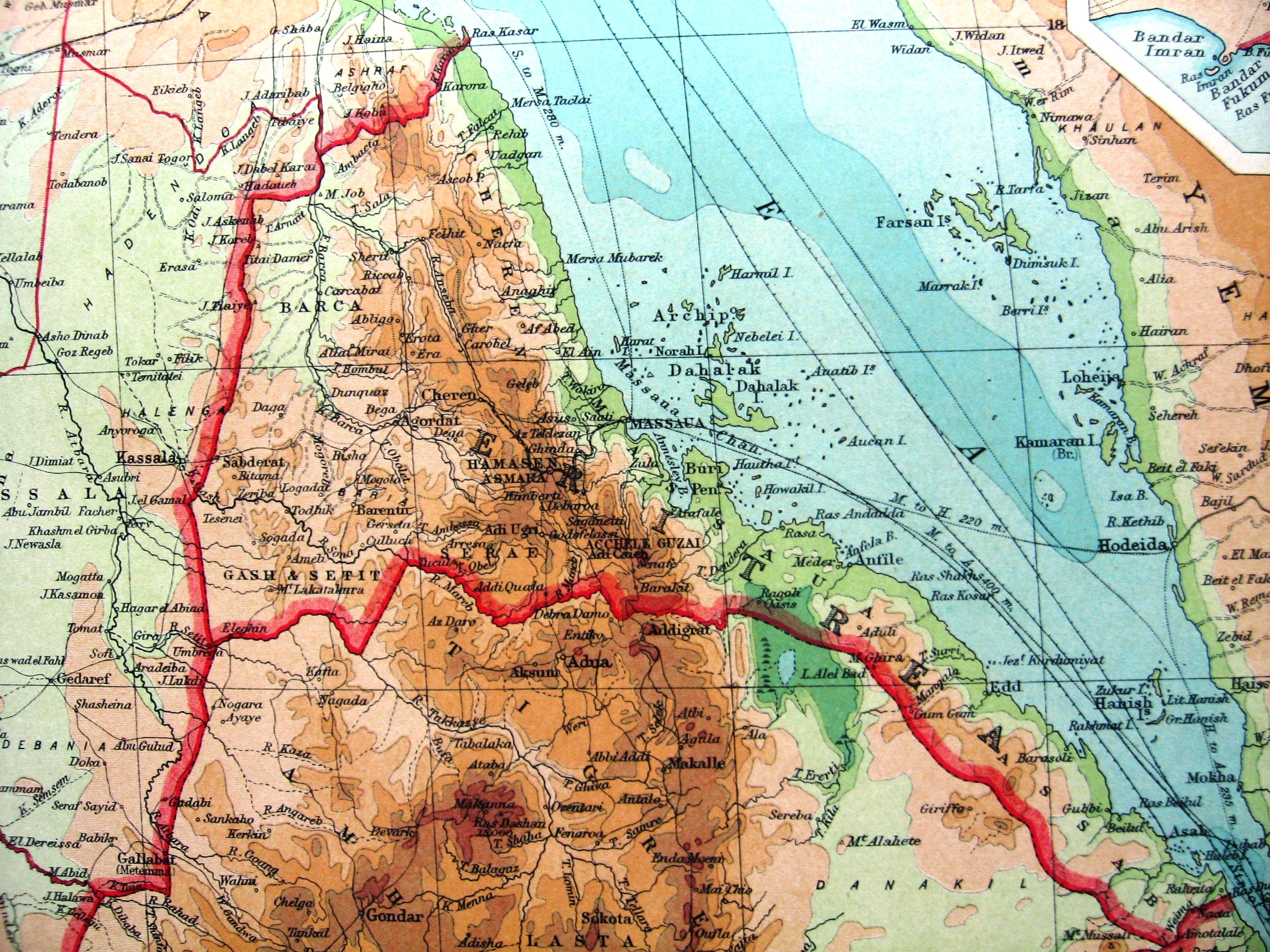
Italian Eritrea, 1922.

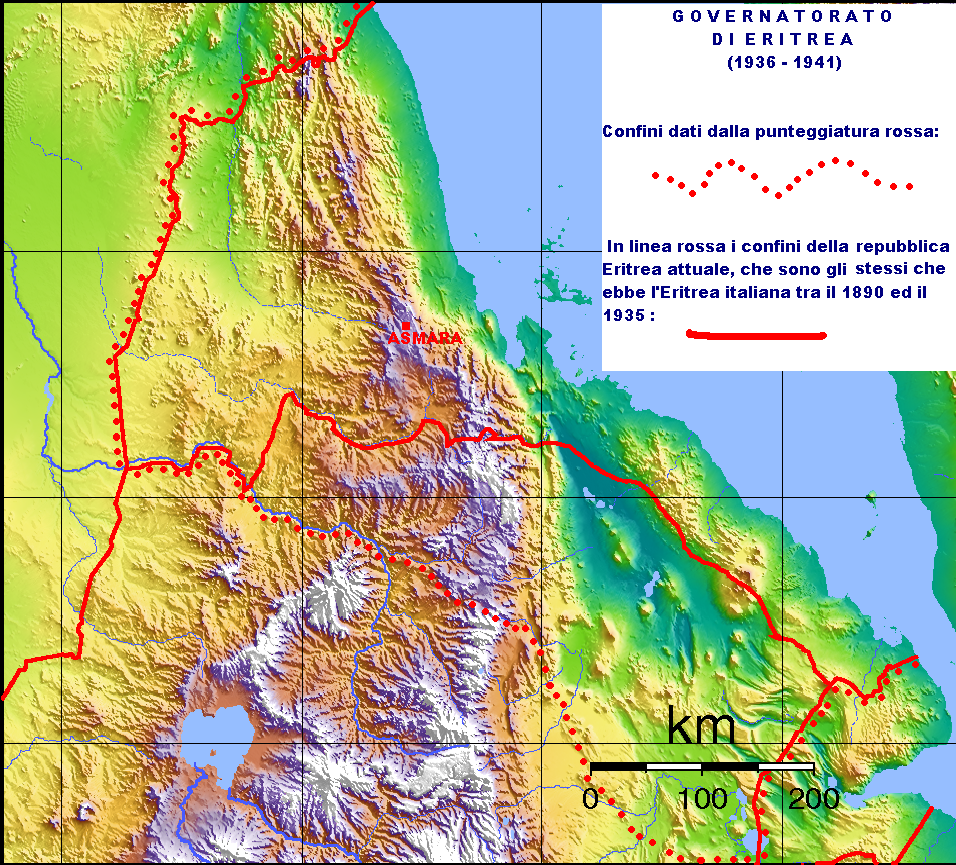
Enlargement and transformation of Italian Eritrea into Eritrea Governorate of the Italian East Africa, 1936–1941.

This article lists the colonial governors of Italian Eritrea from 1890 to 1941. They administered the territory on behalf of the Kingdom of Italy.

== List ==
Before the official creation of Italian Eritrea (Colonia Eritrea) in 1890, the territory had seven interim governors: Giovanni Branchi (1882 to 1885), Alessandro Caimi (1885), Tancredi Saletta (1885), Carlo Genè (1886 to 1887), Tancredi Saletta (1887), Alessandro Di San Marzano (1888) and Antonio Baldissera (1889).

Complete list of Italian Governors of Eritrea:

| Tenure (Note: Dates in italics indicate de facto continuation of office.) | Portrait | Incumbent | Notes |
|---|---|---|---|
Italian Eritrea Colony
| 1 January 1890 to 30 June 1890 | | Baldassarre Orero, Commandant | |
| 30 June 1890 to 28 February 1892 | | Antonio Gandolfi, Commandant | |
| 28 February 1892 to 22 February 1896 | | Oreste Baratieri, Commandant | Commander of the Royal Italian Army in the Battle of Adwa |
| 22 February 1896 to 16 December 1897 | | Antonio Baldissera, Governor | |
| 16 December 1897 to 25 March 1907 | | Ferdinando Martini, Governor | |
| 25 March 1907 to 17 August 1915 | | Giuseppe Salvago Raggi, Governor | |
| 17 August 1915 to 16 September 1916 | | Giovanni Cerrina Feroni, acting Governor | 1st term |
| 16 September 1916 to 20 July 1919 | | Giacomo De Martino, Governor | |
| 20 July 1919 to 20 November 1920 | | Camillo De Camillis, Governor | |
| 20 November 1920 to 14 April 1921 | | Ludovico Pollera, Governor | |
| 14 April 1921 to 1 June 1923 | | Giovanni Cerrina Feroni, Governor | 2nd term |
| 1 June 1923 to 1 June 1928 | | Jacopo Gasparini, Governor | |
| 1 June 1928 to 11 July 1930 | | Corrado Zoli, Governor | |
| 11 July 1930 to 15 January 1935 | | Riccardo Astuto dei Duchi di Lucchesi, Governor | |
| 15 January 1935 to 18 January 1935 | | Ottone Gabelli, acting Governor | |
| 18 January 1935 to 22 November 1935 | | Emilio De Bono, Governor | |
| 22 November 1935 to 22 May 1936 | | Pietro Badoglio, Governor | |
Eritrea Governorate
Part of Italian East Africa
| 1 June 1936 to 1 April 1937 | | Alfredo Guzzoni, Governor | |
| 1 April 1937 to 15 December 1937 | | Vincenzo de Feo, Governor | |
| 15 December 1937 to 2 June 1940 | | Giuseppe Daodice, Governor | |
| 2 June 1940 to 19 May 1941 | | Luigi Frusci, acting Governor | |

From 1936, the colony of Eritrea was increased in size and called Eritrea Governorate, as part of Africa Orientale Italiana (AOI). The Italian governors were under direct orders of the Viceroy (representing the now-King and Emperor Victor Emmanuel III).

== See also ==
- History of Eritrea
- Politics of Eritrea
- List of heads of state of Eritrea
- Italian Eritrea
  - Eritrea Governorate

== Bibliography ==
- Killion, Tom. Historical Dictionary of Eritrea. The Scarecrow Press. ISBN 0810834375.
