= Villa Renatico Martini =

Villa near Pistoia, Italy

Coordinates: 43.87456°N 10.81589°E

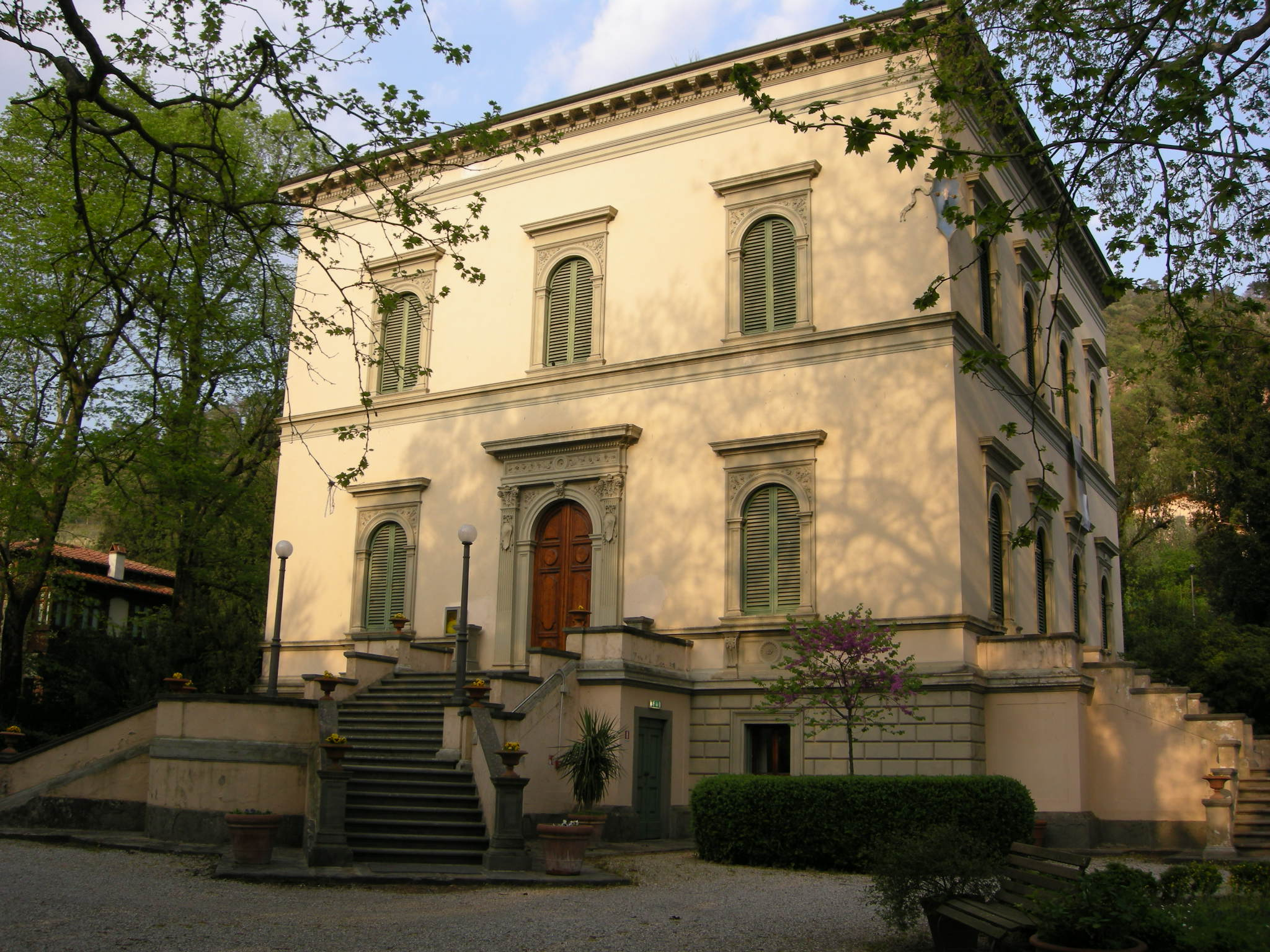

The Villa Renatico Martini is located on Via Gragnano #349 in the town limits of Monsummano Terme, in the Province of Pistoia, Tuscany, Italy. The villa now houses the Museum of Contemporary Art and of the Twentieth Century of Monsummano Terme.

== History ==
The Villa was designed in 1887 by Cesare Spighi in an eclectic style, mixing classical design with some more flowing elements, such as stairwells and lamps that suggest what later became Liberty style. The villa once belonged to the journalist, writer, and publisher Ferdinando Martini (1841-1928). Martini had originally decorated the villa with paintings by Giovanni Fattori, Francesco and Luigi Gioli, Eugenio Cecconi, Niccolò Cannicci, and Angelo Torchi. These were sold after Martini's death.

Ultimately it was purchased by the city, and open since 1988 as a cultural center. By the year 2000, it became a museum hosting art mainly from the 20th century (the Renatico Civic Collection). The collection includes works by Pietro Annigoni, Vinicio Berti, Ferdinando Chevrier, Lamberto Pignotti, Eugenio Miccini, and Ketty La Rocca as well as by contemporary artists from the 21st century. The city and museum sponsor an International Engraving Prize since 1999.

In July 2026, five outdoor light and sound sculptures by the art collective Splaces Studio were installed in the villa's park as part of the project Rendering the Invisible.
