= Ludovico Pollera =

Governor of Italian Eritrea
- In office 20 November 1920 – 14 April 1921
- Preceded by: Camillo De Camillis
- Succeeded by: Giovanni Cerrina Feroni

Personal details
- Born: 4 June 1870
- Died: 21 January 1953 (aged 82)
- Profession: Military officer · government official

Ludovico Pollera (4 June 1870 – 21 January 1953) was an Italian military officer and government official. He served as the Governor of Italian Eritrea from November 1920 to April 1921.

== Biography ==
Pollera was born on 4 June 1870, the brother of military officer and anthropologist Alberto Pollera. He joined the Italian military and in 1895, moved to Italian Eritrea to serve as an officer. Giovanni Masturzi, a colonel in the Italian Army and a friend of Pollera, noted in 1926 that Pollera was "animated by unwavering faith in the secure future of the Colony [and] has dedicated all his intelligent work to it". After initially serving as an military officer, he moved to a civilian role in 1900, where he had "a particularly brilliant career", according to the book Le note del commissario (The Commissioner's notes).

Pollera lived in Agordat, and in 1903, he became the regional commissioner of the province of Barka. He held the rank of captain in the Italian Army reserves until being called to active service in 1912, being assigned to command the Eritrean camel corps. He led company, part of the 5th Ascari Battalion, in war operations in Tripolitania. Pollera remained the commissioner of Barka until 1918. He received the appointment to head of the Directorate of Civil and Political Affairs on 18 June 1918. On 20 November 1920, Pollera was named the new Governor of Italian Eritrea, succeeding Camillo De Camillis. He held this title until 14 April 1921, when he was succeeded by Giovanni Cerrina Feroni.

After his service as governor, Pollera was Secretary General for Civil and Political Affairs of the Colony, the second-highest ranking position in Italian Eritrea at the time. He retired on 11 March 1928 and returned to Italy. Although his brother, Alberto, wrote extensively about life in Eritrea, Pollera only wrote a small number of works about the colony, including a report in 1913 and later several articles after his retirement. He died on 21 January 1953, at the age of 82.
