= Giovambattista Scuticchio Foderaro =

Italian businessman

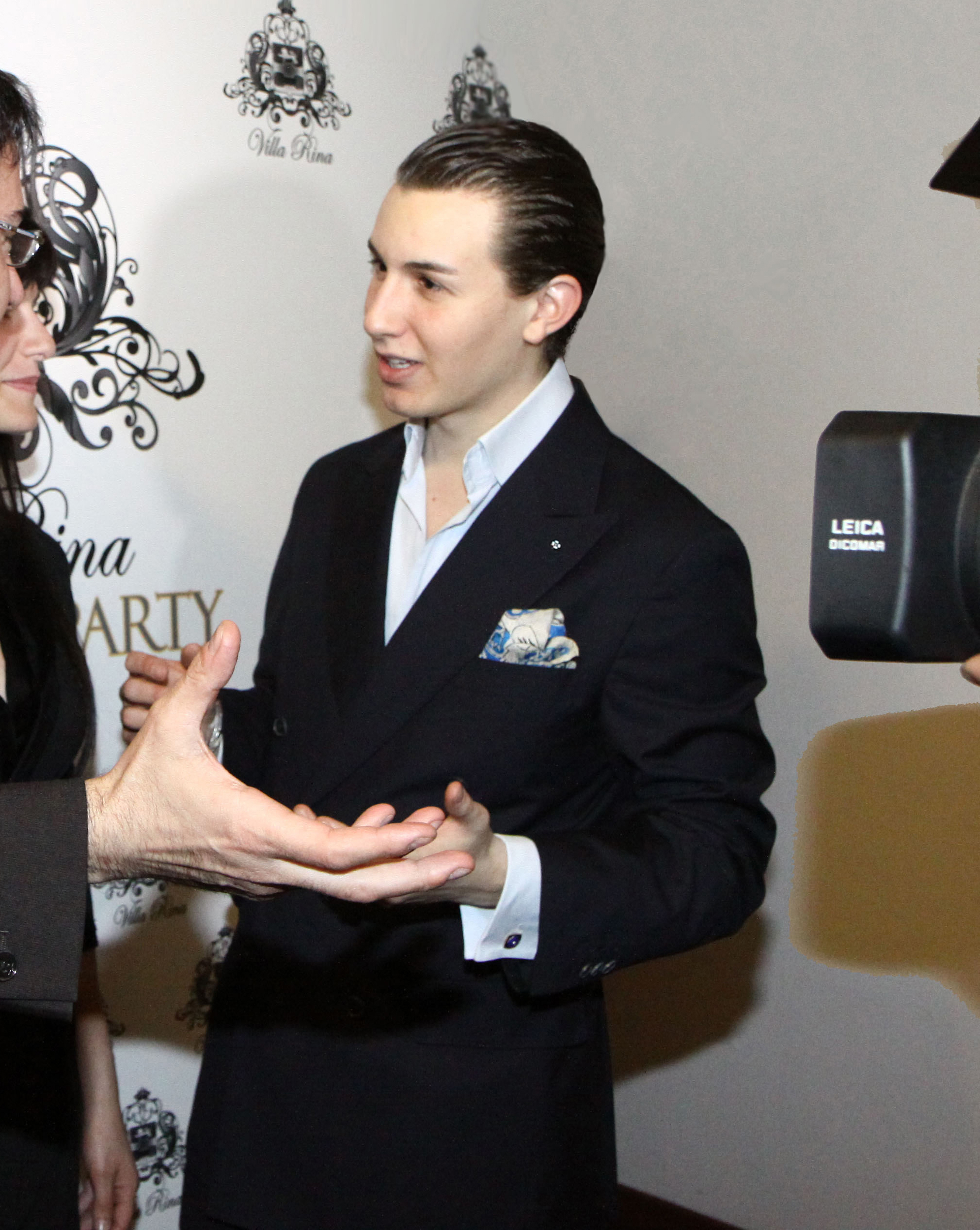
- Born: 14 July 1989 (age 37); Rome, Italy
- Education: Università Cattolica del Sacro Cuore
- Occupations: Businessman and philanthropist
- Website: giovambattistascuticchiofoderaro.com

Giovambattista Scuticchio Foderaro (born 14 July 1989 in Rome) is an Italian businessman, corporate advisory strategist and philanthropist. He is the founder and chief executive of VR Group, a Corporate Advisory, Management and Trade companies league and URBE Foundation (in italian "Fondazione URBE"), a Cultural promotion and Historic Heritage protection no-profit organization.

== Early life ==
Foderaro was born in Rome, to an Italian noble family whose ancestral seat is located mostly in Calabria. He studied at the Economy and Enterprises Management Faculty at Università Cattolica del Sacro Cuore of Rome. He then joined his family business after quitting studies in 2008.

== Career ==
=== VR Group ===
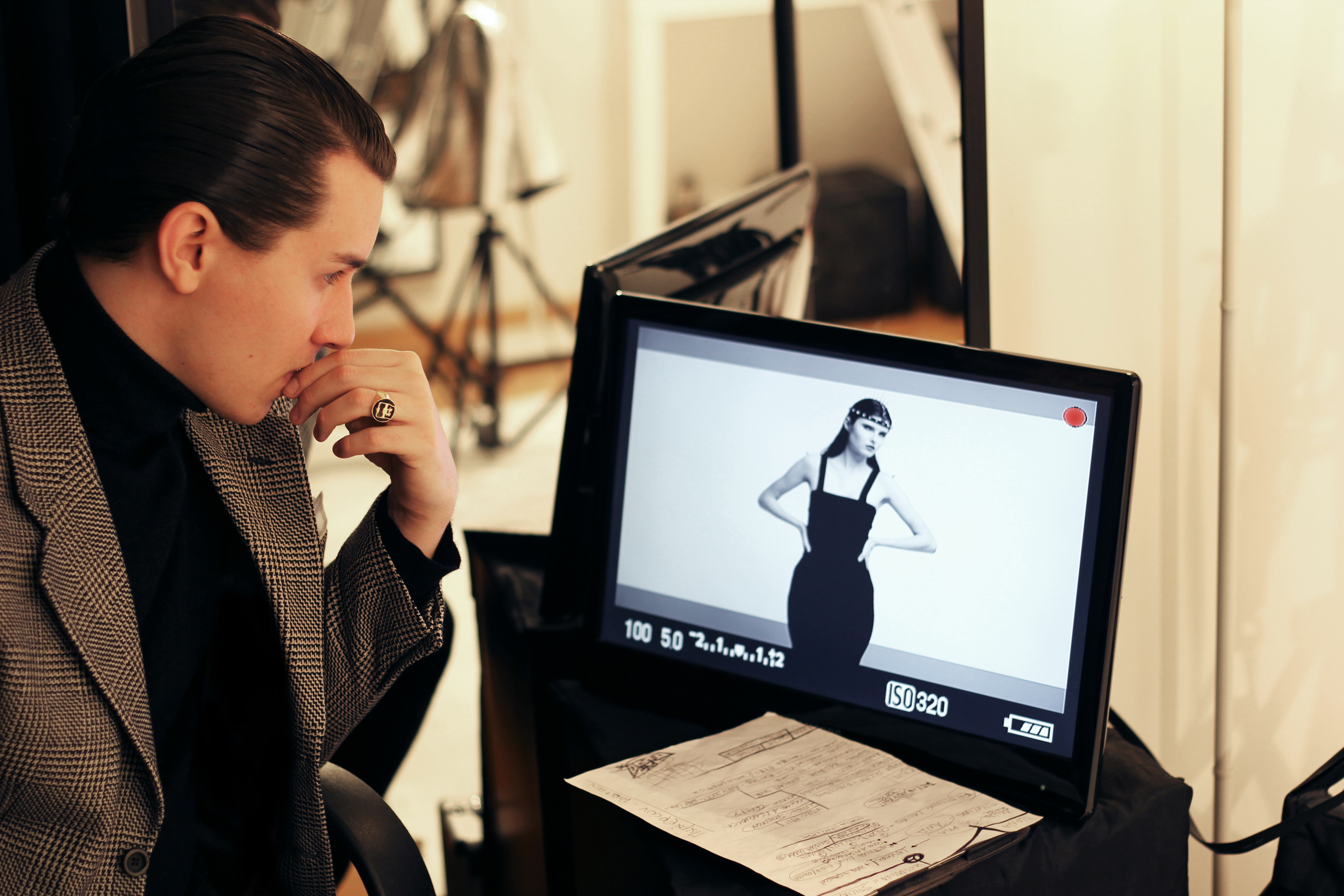
Giovambattista Scuticchio Foderaro directing a shooting

In 2008, Foderaro founded the first firm of the group, VR - STEERING MEDIA, also known as VR Production & Brand Management, primarily working in Fashion Industry and Show Business, then even in Art Exhibition Management.

From 2011 to 2016, Giovambattista expanded the Group of firms with three other companies which comprise today's VR league: VR Management, founded in 2011 an international Mother Agency working in Model and Artists Management worldwide; VR Corporatenext is a Corporate Advisory and Intergovernmental Affairs firm which was established in 2015, a NATO Commercial and Government Entity, and a UN (Unites Nations) Global Market Operator.

VR The Incubator, in 2016, was developed through VR Production & Brand Management firm. VR Asset Management was established as a sister company of VR Corporatenext in 2017.

The VR Group expansion project saw the founding of VR Corporatenext; Corporate Advisory firm, which was established in 2015. In 2016, and VR The Incubator was developed through VR Production & Brand Management. VR Asset Management was established as a sister company.

Today the main company is VR Corporatenext, a Corporate Advisory, Management and Trade firm; a NATO Commercial and Government Entity and a UN (Unites Nations) Global Market Operator. Through VR Corporatenext, Foderaro gave birth to few cooperations with the Italian Ministry of Health during the SARS-CoV-2 pandemic and during the XVI Italian Legislature with the Ministry of Equal Opportunity.

In 2020, Giovambattista was welcomed into the Forbes Business Council, a major growth and networking organization for successful business owners and leaders worldwide.

Foderaro is also a part of NATO, UNGC, Forbes Councils, Rotary International, General Confederation of Italian Industry, ADC, Circoli della Libertà, Europeana, IoD, ERC, IED, ECA, UNI, NDIA, and other organizations. Foderaro is active on web and social medias where he regularly speaks about economics, finance and corporate advisory as well as historic and archeological heritage. He is often published on Forbes for his entrepreneurial and strategic academical analysis about the world of finance and monetary instruments as well as administration and overall company management.

=== Foderaro Group ===
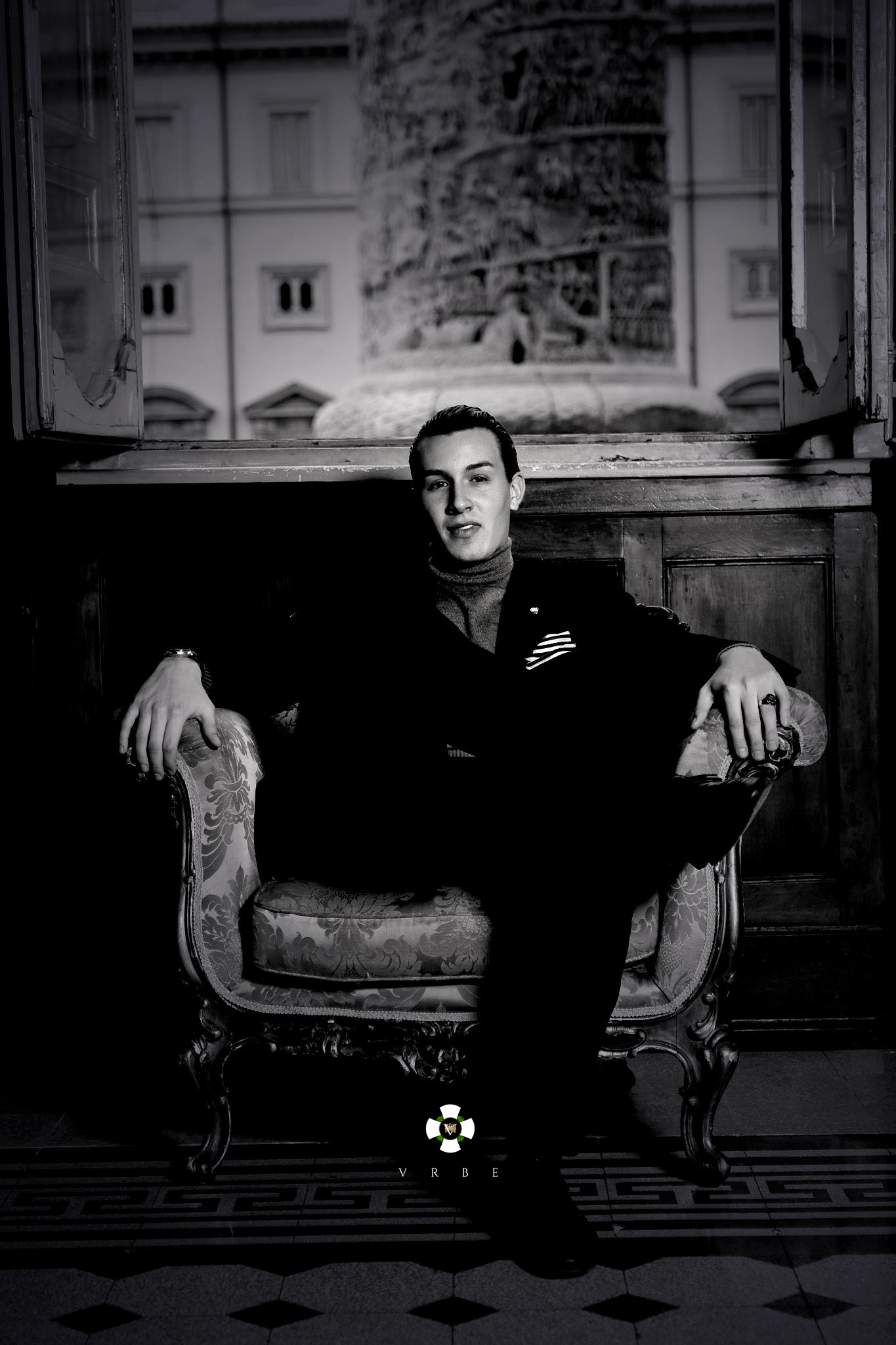
Giovambattista Scuticchio Foderaro - URBE Foundation

In the Foderaro Group, his family business, Giovambattista saw his first entrepreneurial experiences. He started projects related to Maritime and Land Transport, the notable one being the "Wi-Fi On Board" project. In 2011, the idea was presented for people traveling through buses. The company, Foderaro Autoservizi, became the first one to install a Wi-Fi system on board for interregional and national routes. This system is now used by many companies across Europe. In 2012, Giovambattista and his grandfather Battista, received the Smart Move Award powered by the Associazione Nazionale Autotrasporto Viaggiatori (ANAV), for the Innovation and Renovation.

=== URBE Foundation ===
In 2016, based on his passion of Historical Heritage beauty, Foderaro founded URBE Foundation. The project emphasizes on safeguarding Historical and Cultural Heritage linked to Rome and its Eurasian History. This is mainly achieved by Arts, of the Cultural projects, Research and Education. The project is aimed at preservation and valorisation of Artistic Heritage, public as well as private assets. As cultural and artistic heritage estimating person, since he was child he was a collector of art; today he is an antiquity and archeology connoisseur among auction houses and collecting entities for URBE Foundation as well for the several pieces he acquired all around the world.

== Family ==
Foderaro's grandfather, Dr. Battista Foderaro, is the pioneer of Transport (in both sea and land) and Tourism with a long entrepreneurial history of Mediterranean in Tourism and Transport. Battista Foderaro is a Comm. Officer, entrepreneur, politician, and shipowner. He is the son of the Knight Officer Antonio Foderaro and nephew of the Italian Deputy Secretary Hon. G.C. Knight Prof. Salvatore Foderaro who was among the principals of first five Italian Republic Legislatures. Around the '60s-70s, he carried out intense and inspirational work in the African history of the Intergovernmental and Foreign affairs, was the President of African Italian Institute, today IsIAO. As a politician, he inspired Giovambattista to build relationships and cohesion with many of the Magreb, sub-Saharan and countries of the Mashreq area. Similarly, many of his ancestors are notable in history, such as Giuseppe Foderaro, from whom comes Giovambattista's passion to History and Culture which eventually translated into URBE Foundation.
