= Riccardo Di Lucchesi =

Italian diplomat and writer

Riccardo Astuto di Lucchese

Italian Governor of Eritrea
- In office July 1930 – January 1935
- Preceded by: Corrado Zoli
- Succeeded by: Emilio De Bono

Personal details
- Born: January 1, 1882 Naples
- Died: August 25, 1952 (aged 70) Francavilla al Mare

Riccardo Astuto di Lucchesi (January 1, 1882 – August 25, 1952) was an Italian diplomat and writer. He was born in Naples. He was the Italian colonial governor of Eritrea for five years, from 1930 to 1935.

== Biography ==
Born in a noble Sicilian family but residing in Naples where he was born in 1882, he graduated in law from the University of Rome.

From 1913 to 1915 he was first secretary then head of the civil affairs office of the governorate of Tripolitania. Transferred to Cyrenaica, he held several positions (secretary general in Benghazi, regional commissioner in Derna), including that of director (1919), until the disagreement with the governor Giacomo De Martino on the conciliation policy implemented with the Senussi forced him to a new series of transfers: first in Somalia, from 1922 in Tripolitania and then from June of the following year again in Cyrenaica.

After being long director general of the Ministry of Colonies (1924-1930), from mid-July 1930 until mid-January 1935 he was governor of Eritrea. He promoted the construction of the railway from Asmara to the border with Sudan, but WW2 blocked this project.

Placed in retirement, he continued to hold important positions, mainly of study and research. Furthermore, even after the end of WW2, he was president of the Italian-African Institute, a member of the Institute for the East and a member of the foreign policy commission of the Christian Democracy party.

He promoted in the late 1940s the return to Italian administration of the former Italian colonies in Africa, but he was successful only with Somalia.

He died on holiday in Francavilla al Mare, outside Pescara on the Adriatic, in 1952.

== Writings ==
In his writings of the late 1920s he paid attention to Africa's problems, advocating the possibility of incorporating it into the European socio-political structure ("Eurafrica"), while those of the late 1930s deal with the problem of race, adhering, in line with the spirit of the fascist racial laws of the period, to the "canon" of safeguarding Aryan purity in Africa.

- La legge organica per l'impero dell'Africa Orientale Italiana, in Rassegna italiana, XIX (1936), pp. 641–651.
- L'impero italiano nel quadro generale dell'Africa, in L'Impero (A.O.I.). Studi e documenti of T. Sillani..., Roma 1937, pp. 265–282.
- L'originalità dell'ordinamento dell'impero coloniale italiano, in Civiltà fascista, IV (1937), pp. 604–615.
- L'impero fascista, in Gerarchia, XVII (1938), pp. 163–169.
- Popolamento ed equilibrio economico in Africa Orientale Italiana, in Rassegna economica dell'Africa italiana, XXVIII (1940), pp. 421–431.
- Soluzione del problema dell'Africa, in Gli Annali dell'Africa italiana, III (1940), pp. 29–45.
- Il problema fondamentale della cooperazione europea in Africa, ibid., pp. 63–77

He also edited the four volumes of the Eritrean Diary ("Diario Eritreo") of Ferdinando Martini in 1940.

After WW2 he wrote:

- Linee principali di una amministrazione fiduciaria delle nostre colonie, in Rassegna di studi sociali, I [1947], pp. 296–342.
- L'Eritrea alla commissione dei "Quattro", in Rivista del commercio, II [1948], n. 1, pp. 35–44.

| Preceded by Corrado Zoli | Italian Governor of Eritrea; 1930–1935 | Succeeded by Emilio De Bono |

== Bibliography ==
- V. Clemente, Astuto di Lucchese, Riccardo, in «Dizionario Biografico degli Italiani», vol. 34, Istituto dell'Enciclopedia Italiana, Roma 1988.
