= Luigi Mercatelli =

Italian politician, attorney and diplomat

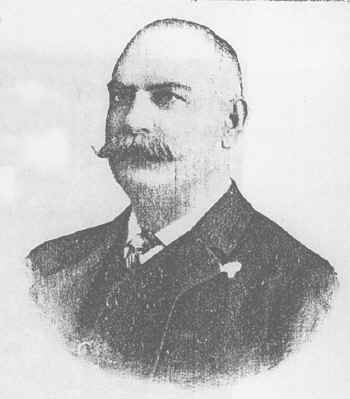

Italian Commissioner-General of Somaliland
- In office 16 March 1905 – 1906
- Preceded by: Giorgio Sorrentino (commissioner)
- Succeeded by: Giuseppe Salvago Raggi

Italian Governor of Tripolitana
- In office 6 July 1920 – July 1921
- Preceded by: Vittorio Menzinger
- Succeeded by: Giuseppe Volpi

Personal details
- Born: 21 October 1853 Alfonsine, Papal States
- Died: 4 April 1922 (aged 68) Rio de Janeiro, Brazil

Luigi Mercatelli (21 October 1853 – 4 April 1922) was an Italian politician, attorney and diplomat.

== Life ==
Luigi Mercatelli was born in Alfonsine (near Ravenna, Italy) in 1853. Graduated as lawyer in Ferrara, showed since young sympathies for the development of Italian colonialism. He was friend of Giovanni Pascoli and wrote for the Naples newspapers Il Corriere di Napoli and Il Mattino. Mercatelli participated in the conquest of Eritrea in the 1890s, supporting the colonialism of Prime Minister Giovanni Giolitti.

He was initially named Consul of Italy in Zanzibar in 1903 and the Commissioner-general of Italian Somaliland (1905–1906). After World War I, he was named Governor of Italian Tripolitania (1920–1921).

He was the Italian ambassador to Brazil, when he died in Rio de Janeiro in 1922.

== See also ==
- Italian Somalia
- Italian Eritrea
