= Audio Analogue =

Italian home audio equipment manufacturer

Audio Analogue is a manufacturer of home audio equipment based in Monsummano Terme, PT, Italy. Established in 1995, they sell a wide range of CD players, amplifiers, and tuners. One of its most popular and well-reviewed products is its Puccini amplifier.

== See also ==
- List of Italian Companies
