= Polli (company) =

Italian food company

F.lli Polli SpA
- Type: Private
- Industry: Food
- Founded: 1872; 154 years ago
- Headquarters: Monsummano Terme, Italia
- Products: Preserved vegetables
- Owner: Platinum Equity; (2024–present)
- Website: polli.com

F.lli Polli SpA is an Italian food company that produces preserved vegetables, both pickled and in oil, in glass containers. On December 13, 2024, Platinum Equity announced that it has completed the purchase of the firm.

== History ==
The company was founded in Milan in 1872. The head office is now in Monsummano Terme, in Tuscany in central Italy. The company has three factories in Italy and Spain. It processes about 18,000 tons of vegetables per year, and produces some 45 million jars of food.

In 2019 it acquired Valbona, a manufacturer of pesto in Padua, for €13 million.
