= Alfredo Guzzoni =

Italian military officer in World Wars I and II

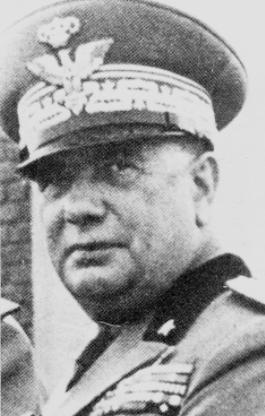
- Guzzoni in 1941
- Born: 12 April 1877; Mantua, Kingdom of Italy
- Died: 15 April 1965 (aged 88); Italy
- Military career
- Allegiance: Kingdom of Italy
- Branch: Royal Italian Army
- Commands: General Officer Commanding 6th Army, Sicily; Deputy Chief of the Supreme General Staff; Army of the Po
- Conflicts: World War I; Second Italo-Abyssinian War; Invasion of Albania; World War II; Italian invasion of France; Greco-Italian War; Allied invasion of Sicily

Alfredo Guzzoni (12 April 1877 – 15 April 1965) was an Italian military officer who served in both World War I and World War II.

== Early life ==
Guzzoni was a native of Mantua, Italy.

== Military career ==
Guzzoni joined the Italian Royal Army (Regio Esercito Italiano) and fought in World War I.

After the Second Italo-Abyssinian War, Guzzoni was appointed Governor of Eritrea. He served as governor from May 1936 until April 1937.

In 1939, Guzzoni had a prominent role in the Italian invasion of Albania and was Commander-in-Chief of the Higher Forces Command Albania in 1940.

In June 1940, after Italy entered World War II, Guzzoni commanded the Italian 4th Army during the invasion of France.

On 29 November 1940, Guzzoni succeeded Ubaldo Soddu as Under-Secretary of War and Deputy Chief of the Supreme General Staff.

In 1943, Guzzoni was General Officer Commanding the Italian 6th Army on Sicily and commander of the Axis troops on Sicily during the Allied invasion of the island. The German–Italian resistance lasted 37 days before the evacuation of the island.

== Armistice and prosecution ==
After the Italian armistice of September 1943, Fascist republican soldiers captured general Guzzoni, but he avoided execution thanks to the help of some German officers who appreciated his role during the defense of Sicily.

== Notes and references ==
- Crociani, Piero (2003). "Guzzoni, Alfredo". Dizionario Biografico degli Italiani (in Italian). Vol. 61: Guglielmo Gonzaga–Jacobini. Rome: Istituto dell'Enciclopedia Italiana. ISBN 978-88-12-00032-6.

== See also ==
- Albania under Italy
- Allied invasion of Sicily
- Armistice between Italy and Allied armed forces
- Army Group Liguria
- Eritrea Governorate

Political offices
| Preceded by Pietro Badoglio | Governor of Eritrea; 1936–1937 | Succeeded by Vincenzo De Feo |
