= Vittorio Menzinger =

Italian politician

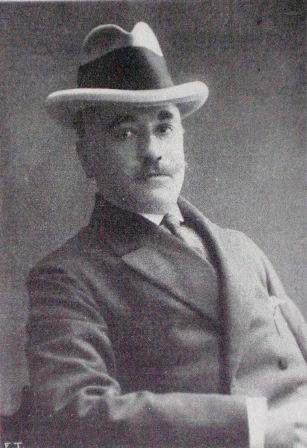

Italian Governor of Tripolitana
- In office 16 August 1919 – 10 July 1920
- Preceded by: Vincenzo Garioni
- Succeeded by: Luigi Mercatelli

Personal details
- Born: 1861
- Died: 1925 (aged 63–64)

Vittorio Menzinger (1861-1925) was an Italian politician. He was a governor of Tripolitania (1919-1920). He was its first civil governor after a series of military ones.

Formerly, he had been an acting mayor of Pisa (1905-1907), and Naples (1913-1914).

== Notes ==
Government offices
Preceded by Giuseppe Gambini	Mayor of Pisa (acting); 1905-1907	Succeeded by Giuseppe Gambini
Preceded by Francesco Chioccarelli	Mayor of Naples (acting); 1913-1914	Succeeded by Vincenzo Pericoli
