= Tommaso Carletti =

Italian politician

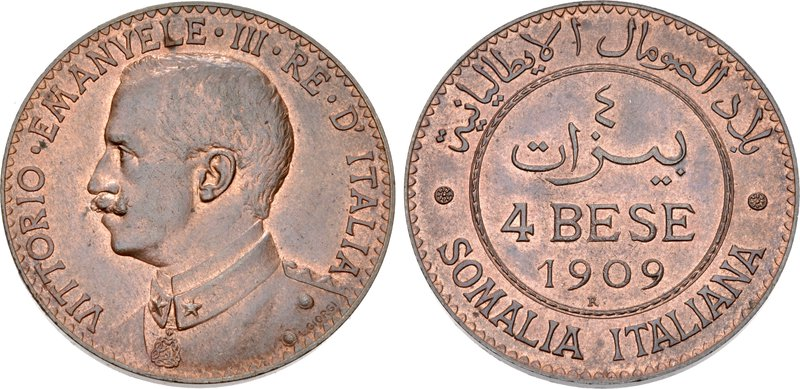
Four bese
Vittorio Emanuele III	Denomination and date in four lines (in Italian & Arab)
Governor Tommaso Carletti introduced the currency use of "Rupia" and "Bese" in Italian Somalia

Tommaso Carletti (16 April 1860 – 16 May 1919) was born in Viterbo (Italy) and was one of the Governors of Italian Somalia.

== Life ==
Tommaso Carletti was born in Viterbo (Lazio) on April 16, 1860 and graduated as attorney in Rome. He started a career of diplomat in 1885, as Italian vice-consul in Tunisia.

Tommaso Carletti was the Commissioner-General of the Italian colony in Banadir from 1907 to 1908.

Later he was named Governor of the newly created Somalia italiana, that he ruled from 1908 until July 1910 (when was substituted by Giacomo De Martino). In July 1908 Carletti started the full conquest of the interior of Somalia, because until then the Italians controlled only the coastal area around Mogadishu and other port cities. He supported a moderate approach with the Somali populations during this initial conquest, but was forced to have harsh political discussions with military commander Antonino Di Giorgio who did a bloody campaign in the Scebeli region.

In 1909 Carletti introduced the Somali Rupia as the currency of Somalia in use, which lasted until 1925. The Somali Rupia was divided into bese coins.

Carletti died on May 16, 1919 in his Viterbo, where was commemorated with full honors.

== See also ==
- Ministry of Foreign Affairs (Italy)
- Foreign relations of Italy

== Bibliography ==
- Beltrami, Vanni. Italia d'oltremare: storie dei territori italiani dalla conquista alla caduta. Publisher Edizioni Nuova Cultura. Roma, 2011 ISBN 8861347029
- *Calchi Novati, Gian Paolo. L'Africa d'Italia Editori Carrocci. Roma, 2011.

== See also ==
- Italian Somalia
- Mogadishu under Italian rule

Preceded by Giuseppe Salvago Raggi	Italian Governor of Somaliland; 1908–1910	Succeeded by Giacomo De Martino
