= Eritrea Governorate =

Italian colony in East Africa (1936–1941)

Eritrea Governorate Governatorato dell'Eritrea
- Governorate of Italian East Africa
- Coat of Arms

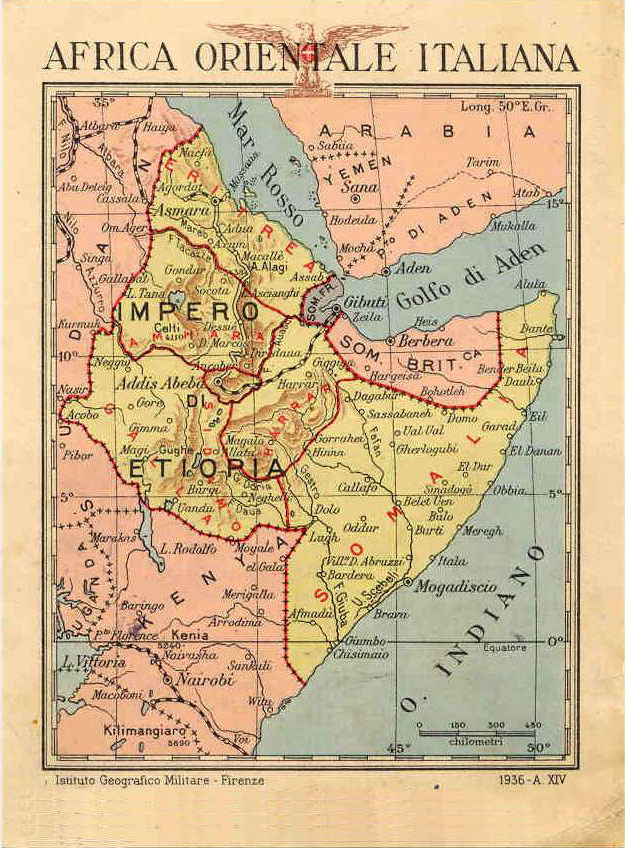
- Eritrea within "Italian East Africa"
- Capital: Asmara
- Population
- ca. 1,500,000
- Government
- Governor
  - 1936-1937: Alfredo Guzzoni
  - 1937: Vincenzo De Feo
  - 1937-1940: Giuseppe Daodice
  - 1940-1941: Luigi Frusci
- Historical era: Interwar period World War II
  - Created: 1 June 1936
  - British occupation: 19 May 1941
Preceded by	Succeeded by
Italian Eritrea; Ethiopian Empire	British Military Administration (Eritrea); Ethiopian Empire

Eritrea Governorate (Governatorato dell'Eritrea) was one of the six governorates of Italian East Africa. Its capital was Asmara. It was formed from the previously separate colony of Italian Eritrea, which was enlarged with parts of the conquered Ethiopian Empire following the Second Italo-Ethiopian War.

== History ==
In 1936, after the defeat of Ethiopia, Italy created an empire in Africa called Africa Orientale Italiana (Italian East Africa). It lasted for six years, until World War II, and was made of six governorates. One of these was the Eritrea Governorate. The original Italian Eritrea, sometimes called Colonia primogenita (First Colony), was enlarged by 110,000 square kilometres (42,000 sq mi) with territories ("Tigrai") taken from northern Ethiopia that were populated mostly by ethnic Eritreans.

In 1938 the Eritrea Governorate was divided in 13 "commissariati" (provinces)

- Commissariato dell'Acchelè Guzai (capital Addì Caièh)
- Commissariato di Adigrat (capital Adigràt)
- Commissariato dell'Hamasien (capital Asmára)
- Commissariato del Bassopiano Occidentale (capital Agordàt)
- Commissariato del Bassopiano Orientale (capital Massáua)
- Commissariato di Cheren (capital Chéren)
- Commissariato della Dancalia (capital Ássab)
- Commissariato di Macallè (capital Macallè)
- Commissariato dei Paesi Galla (capital Allomatà)
- Commissariato del Seraè (capital Áddi Ugrì)
- Commissariato del Tembien (capital Abbì Addì)
- Commissariato del Tigrai Occidentale (capital Ádua)

The Eritrea Governorate in 1938 had an area of 231,280 square kilometres (89,300 sq mi) and a population of more than 1,500,000 - of which nearly 100,000 were Italian colonists concentrated in Asmara.

Massawa was the port of the Italian Colony of Eritrea and was hugely improved and enlarged as a part of Italian East Africa.

Eritrea was chosen by the Italian government to be the industrial center of Italian East Africa. The Italian government implemented agricultural reforms, primarily on farms owned by Italian colonists. Exports of coffee boomed in the 1930s.

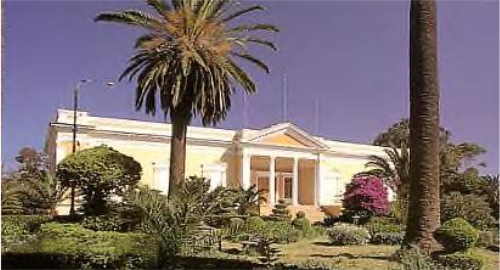
The Governor's Palace in Asmara, built in 1940 and now the President's Palace.

In the region of Asmara there were in 1940 more than 2,000 small and medium-sized industrial companies, concentrated in the areas of construction, mechanics, textiles, electricity, and food processing. According to the Italian census of 1939 the city of Asmara had a population of 98,000, of which 53,000 were Italians. This made Asmara the main "Italian town" of the Italian Empire in Africa. Furthermore, because of the Italian architecture of the city, Asmara was called Piccola Roma (Little Rome).

In all of the Eritrea Governorate there were more than 75,000 Italians in 1939.

Consequently, the living standard of life in Eritrea in 1939 was considered one of the best in Africa, for both the Italian colonists and the native Eritreans. In early 1940 laws were established that enabled all the autochthonous Eritreans in the Italian military forces to receive a pension for their families; no other European colonial country granted this at that time.

In the summer of 1940, with Italy's entry into World War II, the Italians conquered the area of Kassala in British Sudan and annexed it. The mayor of Kassala was the Eritrean hero Hamid Idris Awate.

The Allies invaded and conquered Italian East Africa in the East African campaign of World War II. The last Italian governor of Eritrea, Luigi Frusci, surrendered the governorate to the Allies on 19 May 1941. Italian East Africa came under British occupation, and the British abolished the Eritrea Governorate and created a military occupation government associated with Ethiopia's negus (king).

== Governors ==
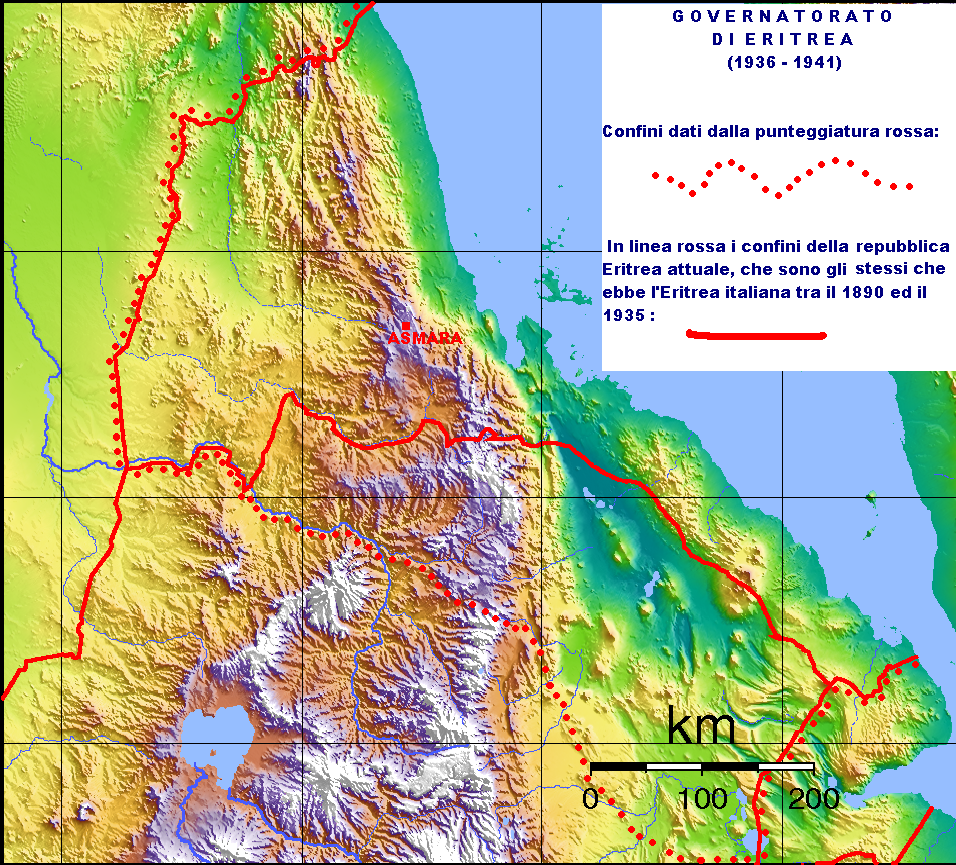
Map of Eritrea Governorate, enlarged with the "Tigrai" region

There were 5 Italian governors, under a Viceroy representing the emperor Victor Emmanuel III:

- Pietro Badoglio, in May 1936
- Alfredo Guzzoni, from May 1936 until April 1937
- Vincenzo De Feo, from April 1937 until December 1937
- Giuseppe Daodice, from December 1937 until June 1940
- Luigi Frusci, from June 1940 until May 1941

== Bibliography ==
- Archivio Storico Diplomatico (1975), Inventario dell'Archivio Storico del Ministero Africa Italiana (in Italian), vol. 1: Eritrea, Etiopia, Somalia (1857-1939), Rome: Ministry of Foreign Affairs, archived from the original on 2017-12-12
- Archivio Storico Diplomatico (1977), Inventario dell'Archivio Eritrea (1880-1945) (in Italian), Rome: Ministry of Foreign Affairs, archived from the original on 2017-12-12
- Bandini, Franco. Gli italiani in Africa, storia delle guerre coloniali 1882-1943. Longanesi. Milano, 1971.
- Bereketeab, R. Eritrea: The making of a Nation. Uppsala University. Uppsala, 2000.
- Lowe, C.J. Italian Foreign Policy 1870-1940. Routledge. 2002.
- Maravigna, Pietro. Come abbiamo perduto la guerra in Africa. Le nostre prime colonie in Africa. Il conflitto mondiale e le operazioni in Africa Orientale e in Libia. Testimonianze e ricordi. Tipografia L'Airone. Roma, 1949.
- Negash, Tekeste. Italian colonialism in Eritrea 1882-1941 (Politics, Praxis and Impact). Uppsala University. Uppsala, 1987.

== See also ==
- List of governors of the Eritrea Governorate
- List of colonial governors of Italian Eritrea
- Italian Eritrea
- Italian Eritreans
- Italian Pidgin of Eritrea
