= Italian Institute for Africa and the Orient =

Italian organization based in Rome (1995–2012)

The Istituto Italiano per l'Africa e l'Oriente (IsIAO), known in English as the Italian Institute for Africa and the Orient, was established in Rome in 1995, as the result of the merging of Italian Institute for the Middle and the Far East (IsMEO) with the Istituto Italo-Africano (IIA). It closed in 2012. Its museum collection is now overseen by the Polo Museale del Lazio.

Before it closed in 2012, the institute was active in the field of cultural promotion aimed at fostering fruitful relations between Italy and the African and Asian countries. The aims of the Institute were: to establish and implement study and research projects; to promote cultural and scientific collaboration initiatives through the exchange of information, experience and knowledge among researchers and specialists; to implement cooperation, consultancy and assistance projects, with special regard to the conservation and promotion of the heritage of the Asian countries and to carry out missions and archaeological campaigns in these countries; to carry on publishing activities alone or in collaboration with other institutions, or with publishers; to enter into conventions or agreements providing for joint activities with universities, academies, cultural and research institutions in Italy and abroad. It was presided over since its inception by Gherardo Gnoli.

== Documentary assets and museum collections ==
The IsIAO library was divided into two sections: 'African' and 'Oriental'. It contained some two thousand five hundred periodical publications (five hundred of which still extant), as well as other rare items such as manuscripts, xylographs, editions, maps and photographs.

The Photograph Library: The African section was inherited from the Ministry of Italian Africa. It comprises some five-hundred thousand photographic prints and twenty thousand negatives. The Oriental section houses some five-hundred thousand photographs shot during missions organized by the institute. Approximately twelve thousand derive from Giuseppe Tucci’s expeditions in the Himalayan region, including unique photographs of Tibetan monuments that no longer exist.

The Map Library housed three thousand geographic maps (a total of fourteen thousand sheets), inherited from the Map Department of the Ministry of Italian Africa. The collection, which covers the final two decades of the 19th century and the first half of the 20th, is the largest of its kind in Italy. Former Italian colonies covering the territories of present-day Eritrea, Somalia, Libya, and Ethiopia are heavily represented.

The Museum Collections: The Oriental collections were the property of the Institute, but were deposited in the 'Giuseppe Tucci' National Museum of Oriental Art in Rome. They consisted of materials uncovered during archaeological excavations, including a major collection of Gandhara art. The African collections, which were conserved by the Institute, included Ethiopian paintings, wooden sculptures, furnishings, local craftwork, and archaeological finds, along with documents and curios belonging to Italian explorers and works of Italian artists who were active in the former colonies.

== Courses of African and Oriental languages and culture ==
Courses offered at IsIAO were a consolidated tradition dating back to 1934, when — under the presidency of Giovanni Gentile and the vice-presidency of Giuseppe Tucci — IsMEO was already running courses in Chinese language and in Japanese language in Rome. In 1951, the so-called 'Practical three-year courses of Oriental languages and cultures' was formally instituted. The courses offered include Chinese, Japanese, Arabic, Hindi, Indonesian etc.

== Publishing activities ==
Starting in the 1950s, IsIAO published more than 500 titles including monographs, critical editions of manuscripts written in oriental languages, excavation reports, conference proceedings and reviews. Editorial series include:

- Serie Orientale Roma (101 titles)
- Reports and Memoirs (41 titles)
- Restorations (7 titles)

Periodicals included up to 2008-2009:

- Africa, a quarterly in Italian, French and English (published 63 issues 1947–2008) ISSN 0001-9747 (relaunched by the institute Centro Studi per i Popoli Extraeuropei "Cesare Bonacossa" (University of Pavia) in 2019 as Africa: Rivista semestrale di studi e ricerche)
- East and West, a quarterly published in English (published 59 issues from 1950 to 2009)

The Institute's Media Store website went online in September 2008, where the IsIAO publisher catalogue could be consulted and purchased.

== Correspondents ==
In order to carry on its research and other activities, IsIAO built up an international network of agreements and memoranda with other European and Asian institutions, and had a number of international corresponding research fellows. Countries in which IsIAO was active included Afghanistan, People's Republic of China, Georgia, Japan, Jordan, Iran, Kazakhstan, Mali, Nepal, Oman, Pakistan, Thailand, Turkmenistan, Uzbekistan, Yemen.

== See also ==
- Museo africano, former anthropological museum in Rome. Its collection was transferred in 2016 to the Rome state museum, the Museo delle Civiltà.

== Bibliography ==
- Tekeste Negash, Bibliography of Italian-language materials found in the Istituto-Italo-Africano in Rome, Italy, Scandinavian Institute of African Studies, Uppsala, 1978.
- Calzini Gysens, L'Istituto Italiano per l'Africa e l'Oriente in Missioni Archeologiche Italiane: La ricerca archeologica, antropologica, etnografica, (a cura di) Direzione generale delle relazioni culturali, Roma, L'Erma di Bretschneider, 1997.

=== Issued by the institute ===
- Claudio Cerreti, La raccolta cartografica dell'Istituto Italo-Africano. Presentazione del fondo e guida alla consultazione, Istituto Italo-Africano, 1987.
- Carla Ghezzi, La letteratura africana nella biblioteca dell'Istituto italo-africano: catalogo delle opere di autori africani e dei testi acquisiti dal 1976 al 1991, Istituto Italo-Africano, Roma, 1993.
- Silvana Palma, L'Africa nella collezione fotografica dell'Isiao. Il fondo Eritrea-Etiopia, Roma-Napoli, Isiao_Università di Napoli "L'Orientale", 2005. IsIAO Catalog of photographs of Ethiopia and Eritrea, from a collection of 35,000.
- Palma, Silvana (December 1989). "La fototeca dell'Istituto Italo-Africa: Appunti di un lavoro di riordino". Africa: Rivista trimestrale di studi e documentazione dell'Istituto italiano per l'Africa e l'Oriente (in Italian). 44 (4): 595–609. JSTOR 40760433..
