= Vincenzo de Feo =

Italian politician

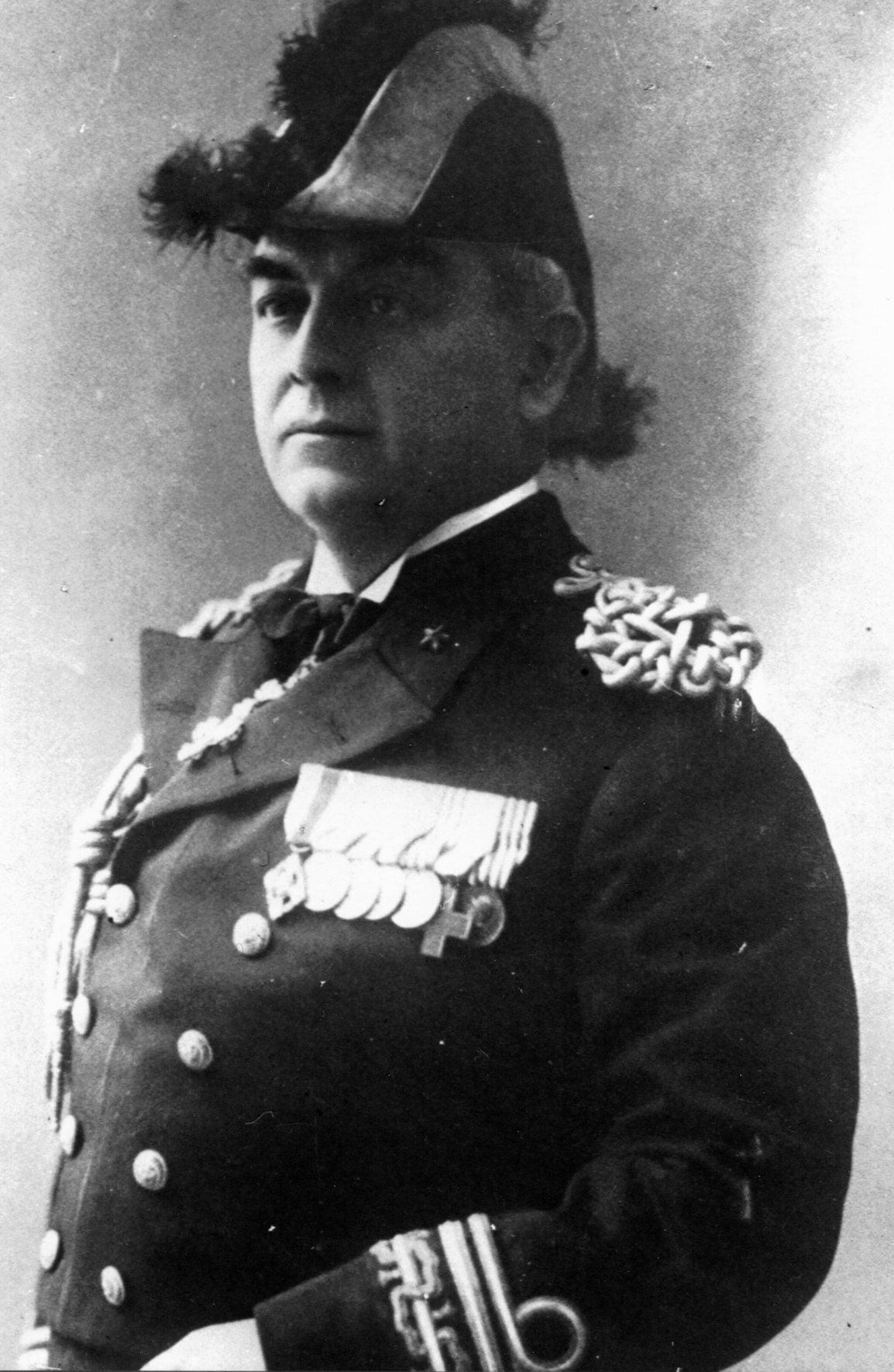
- Born: September 16, 1876; Mirabello Sannitico, near Campobasso
- Died: January 17, 1955 (aged 78); Rome
- Military career
- Allegiance: Kingdom of Italy
- Branch: Regia Marina
- Commands: Admiral of Italian Navy; Governor of Eritrea
- Conflicts: Italo-Turkish War; World War I

Vincenzo de Feo (September 16, 1876 in Campobasso – January 17, 1955 in Rome) was an Italian Admiral. He served as Governor of Italian Eritrea during 1937.

== Biography ==
Vincenzo de Feo was born in Mirabello Sannitico near Campobasso in September 1876. His paternal uncle, Francesco de Feo, was a patriot during the Risorgimento and in 1860 commanded the "First Samnite Legion". The young Vincenzo was formed in the Italian Naval Academy of Livorno, graduating in October 1890 with a degree in electrical engineering.

He took part in the 1911–1912 Italo-Turkish War. During World War I he served on submarines, participating in various military operations in the Mediterranean sea, for which he was decorated with two Silver Medals of Military Valor in 1915 and in 1918.

He became Admiral on December 20, 1934.

He was also an accomplished technician, holding patents of five specializations: underwater weapons, chemical explosives, electronics, telegraphy, ballistics. He invented a peculiar gyroscope called gimetro, an aiming system that was adopted by the Italian fleet from 1930. De Feo collaborated with the "Rivista Marittima" from 1906 to 1936, supporting the strategic importance of submarines and aircraft carriers in naval battles. As uncle of Ugo Tiberio, he supported his research at the Naval Academy for the development of the Italian radar system.

De Feo was appointed in 1937 Governor of Eritrea and remained in Italian Asmara from April 1, 1937 to December 15, 1937. He succeeded to Alfredo Guzzoni, and was later replaced by Giuseppe Daodice.

He was appointed Senator in the Parliament of the Kingdom of Italy, on the proposal of the Minister of the Navy, on March 25, 1939, and was sworn in April 17, 1939.

When World War II started, De Feo was assigned to the Commissione Italiana d'Armistizio con la Francia, signing the Protocol that regulated the conditions of the French surrender with respect to naval issues.

After the Fall of Fascism, the Armistice of Cassibile and the Allied invasion of Italy, on August 7, 1944 the 'High Court of Justice for Sanctions against Fascism of Rome sanctioned him for having supported fascism and declared that he was held responsible of promoting war, which he had made possible with his votes and with individual actions, including propaganda carried on and off the Senate. He filed an appeal with the Court of Cassation against that decision and obtained its annulment with a judgment dated July 8, 1948. He was not dismissed from the Navy but was placed in retirement in 1949.

He died in Rome on January 17, 1955.

Grand'Ufficiale dell'Ordine Corona d'Italia

Medaglia commemorativa dell'Unità d'Italia

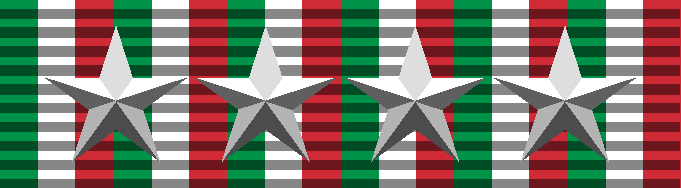
Medaglia commemorativa della guerra italo-austriaca (1915 – 18)

== Awards ==
- Cavaliere dell'Ordine della Corona d'Italia (December 29, 1912)
- Ufficiale dell'Ordine della Corona d'Italia (June 2, 1924)
- Commendatore dell'Ordine della Corona d'Italia (February 6, 1926)
- Grande ufficiale dell'Ordine della Corona d'Italia (October 26, 1933)
- Gran Cordone dell'Ordine coloniale della Stella d'Italia (January 10, 1938)
- Medaglia commemorativa della guerra italo-turca
- Medaglia d'argento al valore militare (2)
- Medaglia commemorativa della guerra 1915–1918
- Medaglia interalleata della Vittoria

== Bibliography ==
- Goffredo Orlandi Contucci, A.O.I.- AFRICA ORIENTALE ITALIANA - La conquista dell'Impero nel ricordo del tenente Goffredo Orlandi Contucci - Edizioni MyLife, Monte Colombo/Coriano, 2009 ISBN 978-88-6285-100-8

== See also ==
- Eritrea Governorate

Political offices
Preceded by Alfredo Guzzoni	Governor of Eritrea; 1937	Succeeded by Giuseppe Daodice
