= Giuseppe Salvago Raggi =

Italian diplomat

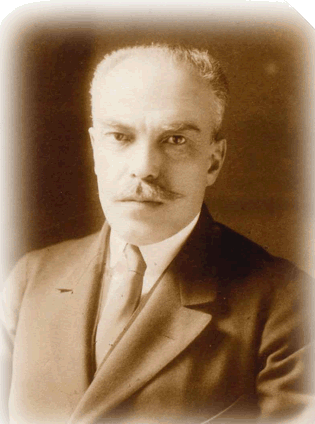

Italian Ambassador to China
- In office 1899–1901
- Preceded by: Renato De Martino
- Succeeded by: Vitale Giovanni Gallina

Italian Governor of Eritrea
- In office 1907–1915
- Preceded by: Ferdinando Martini
- Succeeded by: Giovanni Cerrina Feroni

Italian Governor of Somaliland
- In office 1906–1907
- Preceded by: Luigi Mercatelli
- Succeeded by: Tommaso Carletti

Personal details
- Born: 17 May 1866 Genoa, Italy
- Died: February 28, 1946 (aged 79) Molare, Italy

Giuseppe Salvago Raggi (17 May 1866 – 28 February 1946) was an Italian diplomat, born in Genoa. He was the son of Paris Maria Salvago and Violante Raggi. After his mother's death in 1867, he acquired Raggi as his second surname in January 1881, "in memory of his mother". His father, a landowner with a Catholic-liberal orientation, was a deputy in the Tenth Legislature of the Kingdom of Italy.

Giuseppe Salvago Raggi graduated on 29 May 1887 from the School of Social Sciences in Florence, which his father had helped to found. The school represented the pinnacle of training for the ruling class and in particular for the diplomatic class. After a suggestion from his father, he travelled to different countries in the Middle East. He documented these journeys in his Lettere dall'Oriente (Letters from the East). Back in Italy, began his diplomatic career in 1889.

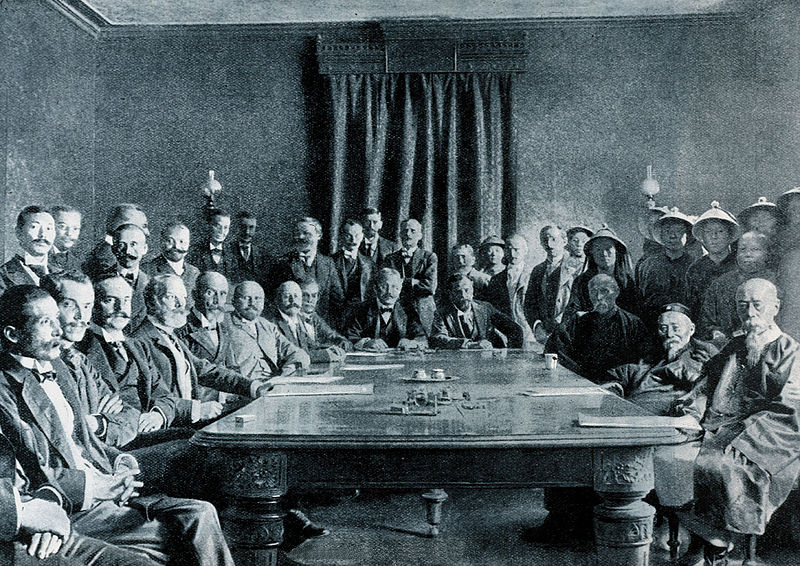
Signatories of the Boxer Protocol. Giuseppe Salvago Raggi (second from the seated left) among those visible in the photo.

He was ambassador of Italy to China (1899–1901) and France (1916-1918). He was the Italian colonial governor of Somaliland (1906–1907) and Eritrea (1907–1915). He is best known for signing the Boxer Protocol on behalf of the Kingdom of Italy.

== See also ==
- List of Directors and Commissioners-General of the United Nations Relief and Works Agency for Palestine Refugees in the Near East
- Ministry of Foreign Affairs (Italy)
- Foreign relations of Italy

Preceded by Renato De Martino	Ambassador of Italy to China; 1899–1901	Succeeded by Vitale Giovanni Gallina
Preceded by Ferdinando Martini	Italian Governor of Eritrea; 1907–1915	Succeeded by Giovanni Cerrina Feroni
Preceded by Luigi Mercatelli	Italian Governor of Somaliland; 1906–1907	Succeeded by Tommaso Carletti
