= Antonio Baldissera =

Italian general

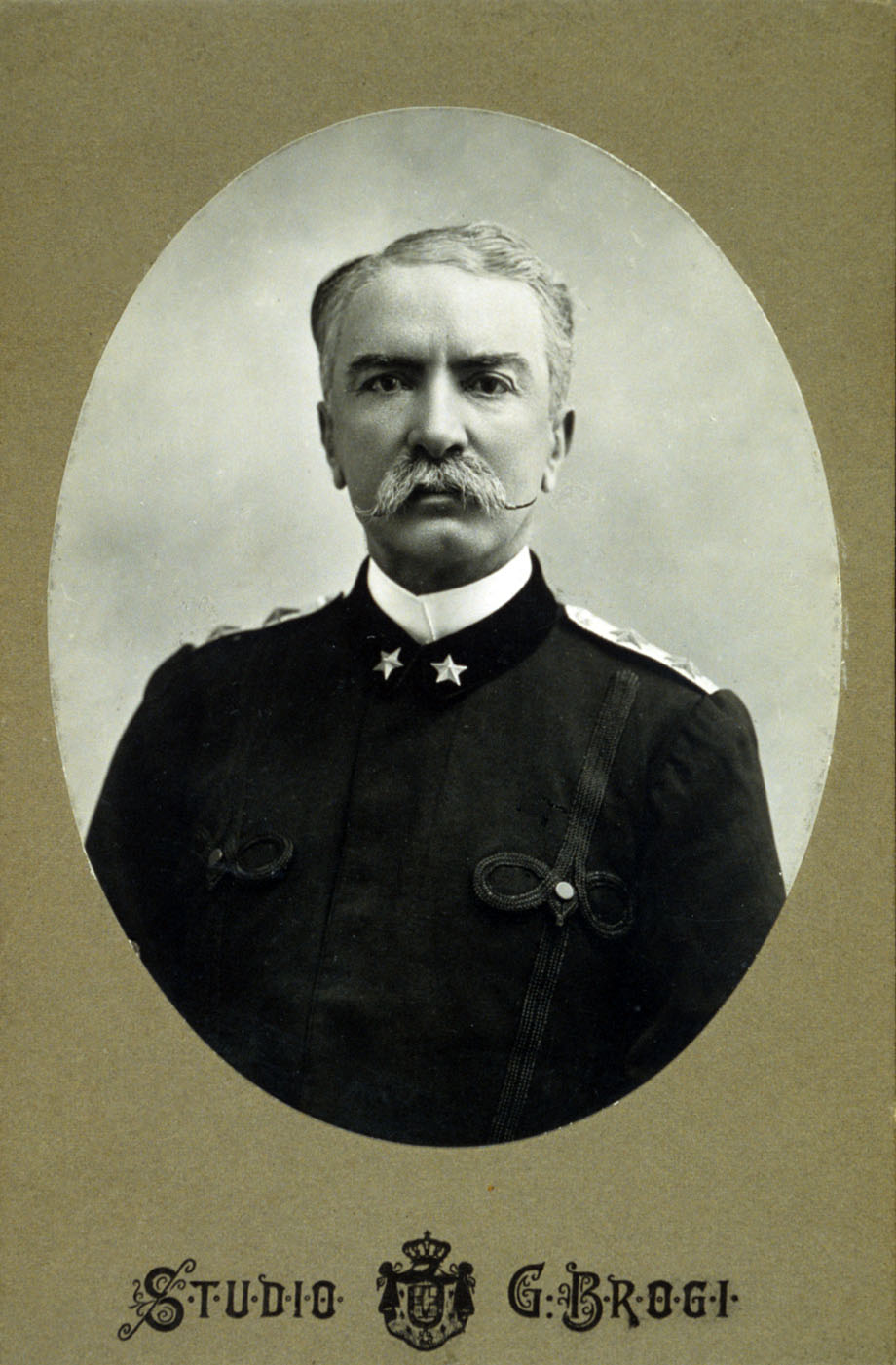
- Born: 27 May 1838; Padua
- Died: 8 January 1917 (aged 78) Florence
- Buried: Cimitero di Soffiano
- Allegiance: Austrian Empire; Kingdom of Italy
- Branch: (Austrian Empire) Imperial Austrian Army; Royal Italian Army
- Service years: (Austrian Empire) 1857–1866 (Kingdom of Italy) 1867–1896
- Rank: Lieutenant General
- Conflicts: Third Italian War of Independence; First Italo-Ethiopian War

Antonio Baldissera (Padua, 27 May 1838 – Florence, 8 January 1917) was an Italian general, active in the Ethiopian Empire (Abyssinia) and in Italian Eritrea during the late 19th century.

== Biography ==
Baldissera was born in on 27 May 1838 in Padua, Venetia (now Veneto), which at the time belonged to the Austrian Empire. He was educated under the supervision of the empress, Maria Anna of Savoy (wife of Ferdinand I), following recommendation by the bishop of Udine. He did his military training at the Theresian Military Academy near Vienna, and graduated in 1857 as an officer in the Imperial Austrian army. He served the Austrians with distinction in the Second Italian War of Independence of 1859. Gratitude for his imperial education is said to have led him to refuse an invitation from fellow Venetians to change sides in the Third War of Independence of 1866, in which he won the Order of Maria Theresa for his services as a captain on the Bohemian front. At the Battle of Custoza (near Verona), he captained the riflemen of the '7th Jägers'. When Venetia became Italian in October of the same year, he opted for Italian nationality and was allowed to retain his rank in the Royal Italian Army. While his military acumen was admired, his Austrian imperial background, coupled with an obstinate streak, caused some diffidence. In 1879 he was promoted colonel of the 7th Bersaglieri, and in 1887 major General.

Towards the end of 1887, during the undeclared war with the Ethiopian Empire (Abyssinia) and the broader scramble for an Italian empire, Baldissera sailed to the key port of Massawa in Italian Eritrea (Note: The Italian colony was officially named Eritrea at the start of 1890, when king Umberto I announced its formation, with Massawa as the capital.) with a large expeditionary force led by General Alessandro Asinari di San Marzano. Their mission was to eliminate the Ethiopian forces of Ras Alula, who had humiliated the Italians earlier in the year at the Battle of Dogali nearby. After San Marzano returned to Italy, Baldissera stayed on in the colony as governor. He was highly regarded by the Italians both as a military commander and administrator. He occupied Asmara and other Eritrean territories, wresting control from the armies of Ras Alula, and had planned further Italian colonial expansion by taking advantage of the chaotic internal divisions of the Ethiopian Empire of the day. In 1888, he initiated the official regimentation of the native colonial troops known as Askari, which led to considerable recruitment with the aim of conquering Ethiopia. He also fostered agriculture and road building. Following a disagreement with the Italian government over his Abyssinian policy, he requested and obtained his recall in 1889.

In 1892 he was promoted lieutenant general. When the First Italo-Ethiopian War broke out in 1895 the then Governor of Eritrea, General Oreste Baratieri, did not enjoy the confidence of the Italian government, which decided to replace him with Baldissera. Although the appointment was kept secret, Baratieri got wind of it, likely persuading him to attack the Ethiopian army, despite having inferior military forces and insufficient supplies, in an apparent attempt to win glory for himself before his successor's arrival. The decision led to the decisive defeat of the colonial forces at the Battle of Adwa on 1 March 1896.

When Baldissera arrived, he found a defeated and demoralized colonial army retreating in the face of the victorious Ethiopian forces. He set about integrating what remained of Baratieri's army with the newly arrived reinforcements. He was able to repel King Menelek II's forces and retake a significant portion of the lost territory, liberating Italian troops who had been left stranded in Adigrat and Kassala. Following Italy's recognition of Ethiopia as an independent country in the Treaty of Addis Ababa, he was forced to restrict his activities to a partial internal reorganization of Eritrea, curtailed by an unsupportive Italian government that had tired of colonial affairs.

In 1897 Baldissera returned to Italy and resumed his duties in the home army, commanding the VII and VIII Army Corps. In 1906 he was made a senator. In 1908 he retired from the army, having reached the upper age limit.

Antonio Baldissera died in Florence on 8 January 1917.

== Castellini Baldissera Family ==
The Baldissera family married into the Castellini family at the end of the nineteenth century, forming the Castellini Baldissera. The family owns a number of ancestral villas and palazzos in and around Milan, as well as Villa Castellini on Lago Maggiore.

== Works ==
Baldissera published two reports on Italian colonial affairs:

- Relazione sulla occupazione dell'Asmara, Voghera-Roma 1889
- Relazione sulle operazioni nel 2º periodo della Campagna d'Africa. 1895-96 (in "Rivista militare italiana", 16 August and 1 September 1896)

== Notes and references ==
=== References ===
Political offices
Preceded by Oreste Baratieri (commander)	Governor of Eritrea; 1896–1897	Succeeded by Ferdinando Martini
