= Giacomo De Martino (governor) =

Italian politician

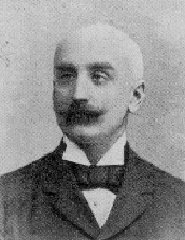

Italian Governor of Somaliland
- In office 1910–1916
- Preceded by: Tommaso Carletti
- Succeeded by: Giovanni Cerrina Feroni

Italian Governor of Eritrea
- In office 16 September 1916 – 20 July 1919
- Preceded by: Giovanni Cerrina Feroni
- Succeeded by: Camillo De Camillis

Italian Governor of Cyrenaica
- In office 5 August 1919 – 23 November 1921
- Preceded by: Vincenzo Garioni
- Succeeded by: Luigi Pintor

Personal details
- Born: 21 September 1849 London
- Died: 23 November 1921 (aged 72) Benghazi

Giacomo De Martino (21 September 1849 – 23 November 1921) was an Italian politician, who was governor in the Italian colonies.

== Biography ==
Born in London in 1849 to a rich Italian family. He was one of the main supporters of Italian colonialism since he was young. Initially, he was a diplomat, but soon started a political career. In 1905, he was elected to the Italian Senate. In 1906, De Martino created the Istituto coloniale italiano, in order to promote the development of the Italian colonies and their management.

Appointed senator (March 4, 1905), De Martino made long journeys to the Indies and to eastern and northern Africa and continued his propaganda with speeches and publications, including the book Cyrene and Carthage (Bologna 1908). Appointed governor of Somalia (January 11, 1910), he began a policy of economic strengthening of that colony and of affirmation and expansion of Italian dominion, starting studies for the construction of a port, a road network and a railway towards the interior, making the first attempts at white colonization, establishing the regime of agricultural concessions on the Giuba and initiating the first contacts with the populations of the Oltre-Giuba. The dams of the Scebeli, the Genale dam and the relative state experimental company, and the purchase of Mahaddei-Uen on the Scebeli, Bur Acaba and Baidoa date back to him. As governor of the Colony of Eritrea (1916-1919), De Martino gave great impetus to public works, such as the construction of the customs sheds of Massawa, the building development of Asmara, the extension of the railway line in Cheren and beyond, towards the Gasc, the plants of the first mountain hydroelectric basin with the Belesa dam, and the industrial agricultural setting of Tessenei. On 1 July 1919, De Martino was sent to govern Cyrenaica. Treccani E.

He had held several colonial posts as he had been a governor of the Italian colonies of Somaliland (1910–1916), Eritrea (1916–1919), and finally Cyrenaica (1919–1921), where he had died at office of heart attack.

== See also ==
- Italian Empire
- List of colonial governors of Italian Cyrenaica

== Bibliography ==
- Bandini, Franco. Gli italiani in Africa, storia delle guerre coloniali 1882-1943. Longanesi. Milano, 1971.
- Istituto coloniale italiano. Rivista coloniale, Volumi 1-2. Editore ICI. Roma, 1906
