= Africa (Italian journal) =

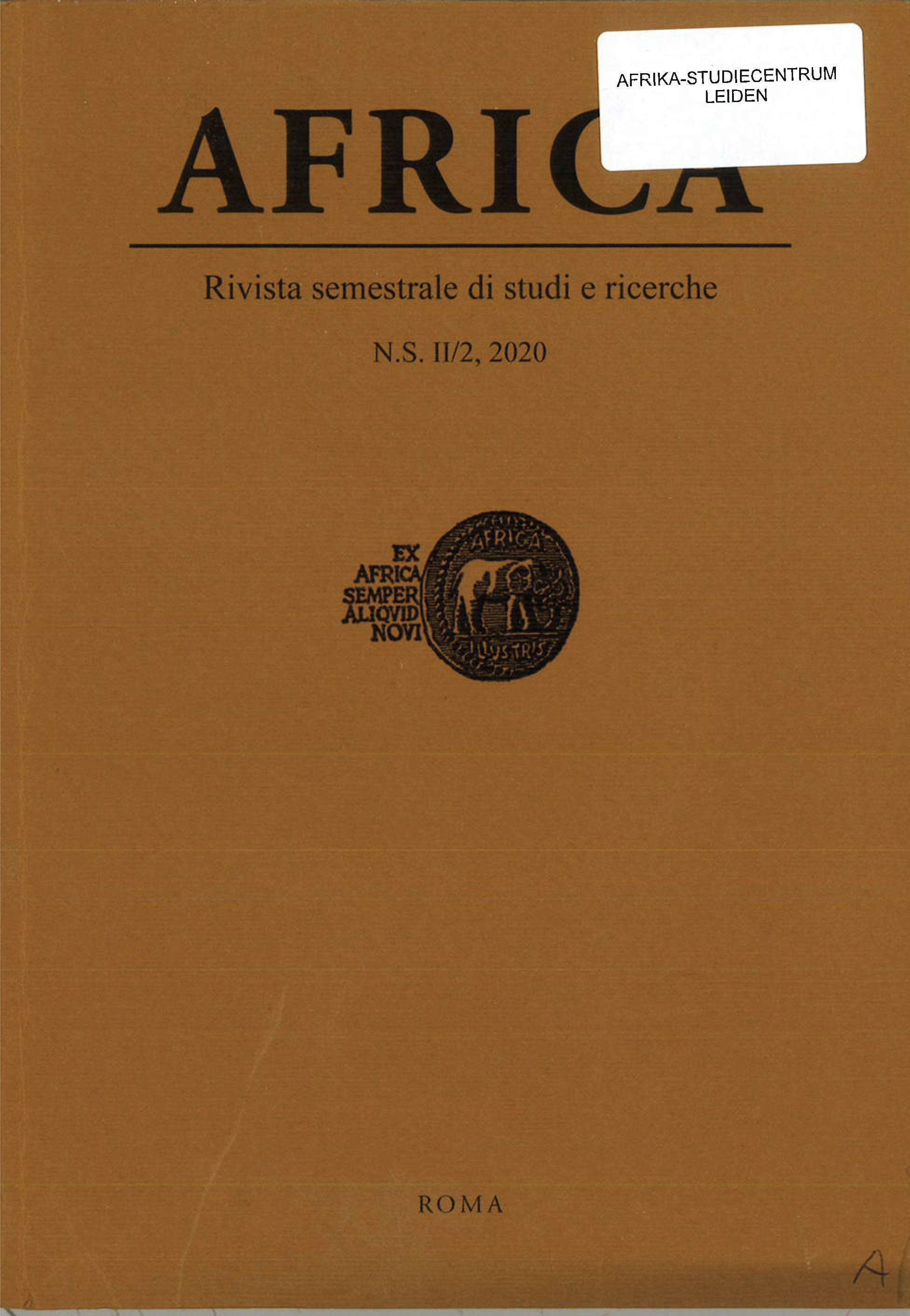
- Discipline: African studies
- Language: English, French, Italian

Publication details
- History: 1946–2010, 2019–present
- Publisher: Centro Studi per i Popoli Extraeuropei "Cesare Bonacossa" (University of Pavia) (Italy)
- Frequency: Biannual
- Impact factor: 0.3 (2022)

Standard abbreviations
- ISO 4: Africa (Rome)

Indexing
- Africa (2019–present)
- ISSN: 2612-3258 (print); 2612-6702 (web)
- LCCN: 2019224052
- JSTOR: 26123258
- OCLC no.: 1264525559
- Africa (1946–2010)
- ISSN: 0001-9747

Links
- Journal homepage

Africa: Rivista semestrale di studi e ricerche (Africa (Rome) or Africa (Italy)) is a biannual peer-reviewed academic journal covering African studies. The journal was established in 1946 and published quarterly until 2010. It was subtitled Rivista trimestrale di studi e documentazione dell'Istituto italiano per l'Africa e l'Oriente and was published by the Italian Institute for Africa and the Orient. Editors-in-chief included Teobaldo Filesi, who in 1965 chose a Humanities approach, and Gianluigi Rossi who maintained this orientation since 1994. After a hiatus, the journal was revived in 2019, published by Viella Editrice on behalf of the Centro Studi per i Popoli Extraeuropei “Cesare Bonacossa” (University of Pavia).

The journal features articles, notes and reports, and book reviews, written in English, French, or Italian.

As of 2023 issues from the years 1950–2009 and 2019–2021 can be read at JSTOR.

This journal should not be confused with the bimonthly magazine Africa, La rivista del continente vero.

== Abstracting and indexing ==
The journal is abstracted and indexed in EBSCO databases, ProQuest databases, and Scopus (2019–2022).

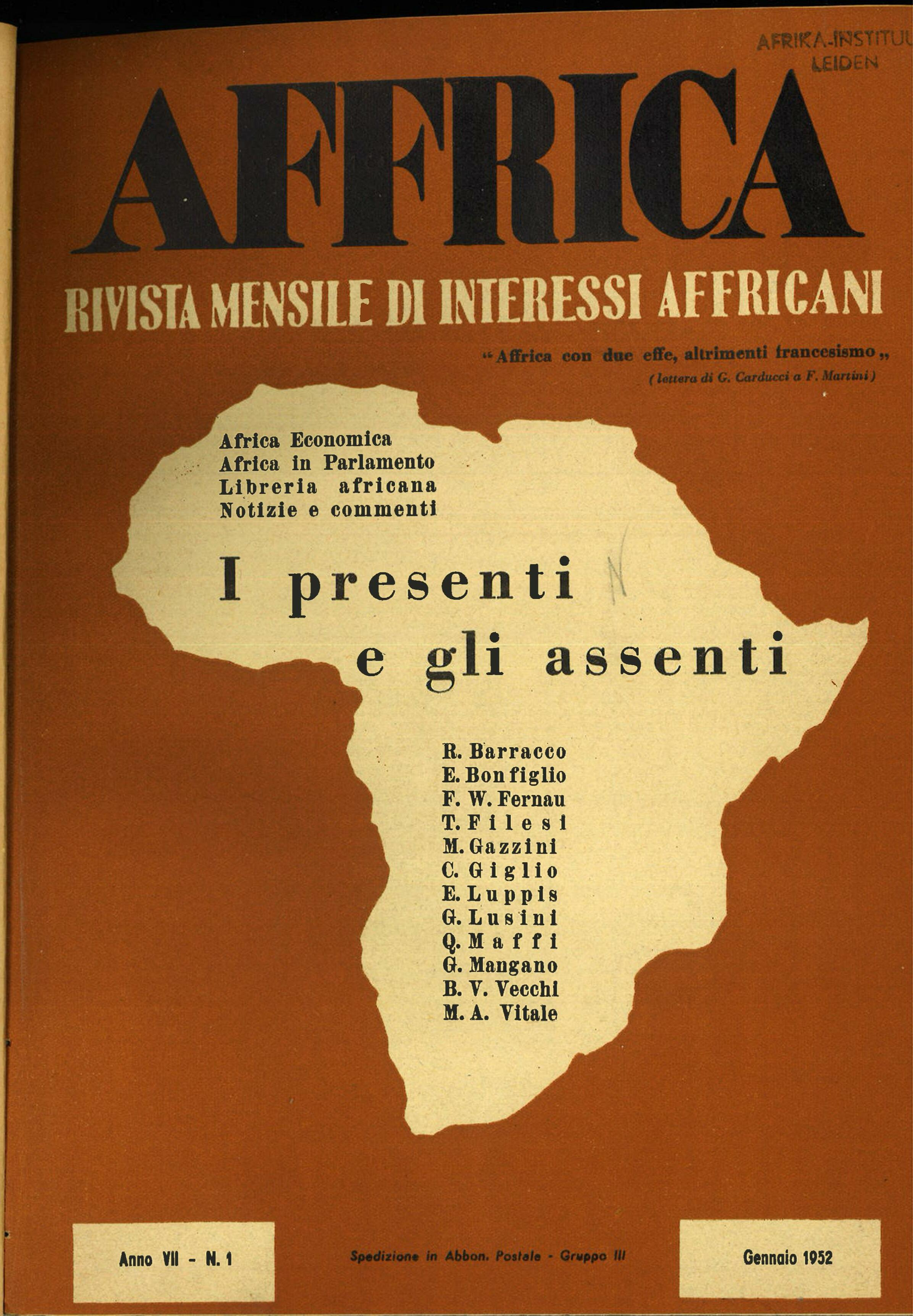
Affrica: Rivista mensile di interessi affricani, Volume 7, issue 1, January 1952

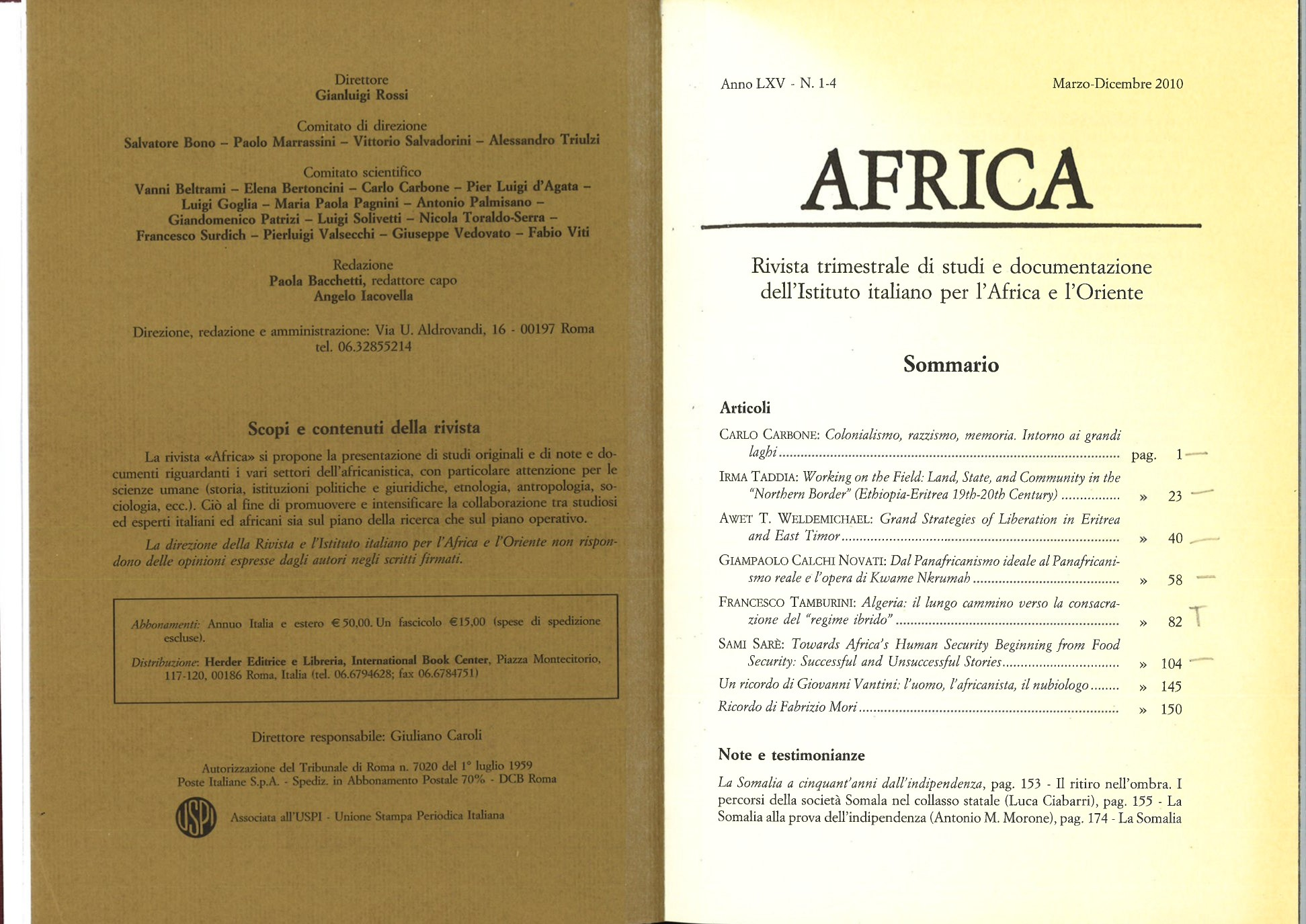
Africa: Rivista trimestrale di studi e documentazione dell'Istituto italiano per l'Africa e l'Oriente, Volume 65, issues 1–4. March–December 2010. Table of contents.
