= Corrado Zoli =

Italian writer, diplomat and explorer

Corrado Zoli (3 January 1877 – 8 December 1951) was an Italian writer, colonial official and explorer of Africa. He was the colonial governor of Italian Eritrea from 1928 to 1930.

== Life ==
He was born in Palermo in 1877.

He was governor of the colony of Juba (annexed to Italian Somalia after WW1) from 16 July 1924 to 31 December 1926, as well as of the Eritrean colony from 1 June 1928 to February 1930. Subsequently, from 1933 to 1944, he was president of the "Italian Geographical Society".

== Principal works ==
- La guerra turco-bulgara. Studio critico del principale episodio della conflagrazione balcanica del 1912, Società editoriale italiana, Milano 1913.
- Le Giornate di Fiume, Zanichelli, Bologna 1921
- La conquista del Fezzan, Istituto coloniale italiano, Tip. Unione Ed., Roma 1921.
- La battaglia di Adua, Istituto coloniale italiano, Grafia, Roma 1923.
- La battaglia del Piave. Note ed impressioni, Stabilimeto poligrafico per l'amministrazione della guerra, Roma 1923.
- Nel Fezzan: note e impressioni di viaggio, Alfieri & Lacroix, Milano 1926.
- Sud America: note e impressioni di viaggio, Sindacato italiano arti grafiche, Roma 1927.
- Cronache etiopiche, Sindacato italiano arti grafiche, Roma 1930.
- La questione dei confini sud-orientali della Libia, Felice Le Monnier, Firenze 1934.
- Etiopia d'oggi, Soc. An. Ital. Arti Grafiche, Roma 1935.
- La conquista dell'Impero. Cronistoria degli avvenimenti diplomatici, militari e politici dal dicembre 1934-XIII all'aprile 1937-XV, Zanichelli, Bologna 1937.
- L'ultimo conflitto cino-giapponese: 7 luglio 1937-30 marzo 1940, Le Monnier, Firenze 1940.
- Espansione coloniale italiana (1922-1937), L'arnia, Roma 1949.

== Bibliography ==
- Elio Migliorini, «ZOLI, Corrado» la voce nella Enciclopedia Italiana, III Appendice, Roma, Istituto dell'Enciclopedia Italiana, 1961. (Testo on line).

Preceded by Jacopo Gasparini	Italian Governor of Eritrea; 1928–1930	Succeeded by Riccardo Di Lucchesi
