= Monsummano Terme =

- Comune
- Comune di Monsummano Terme
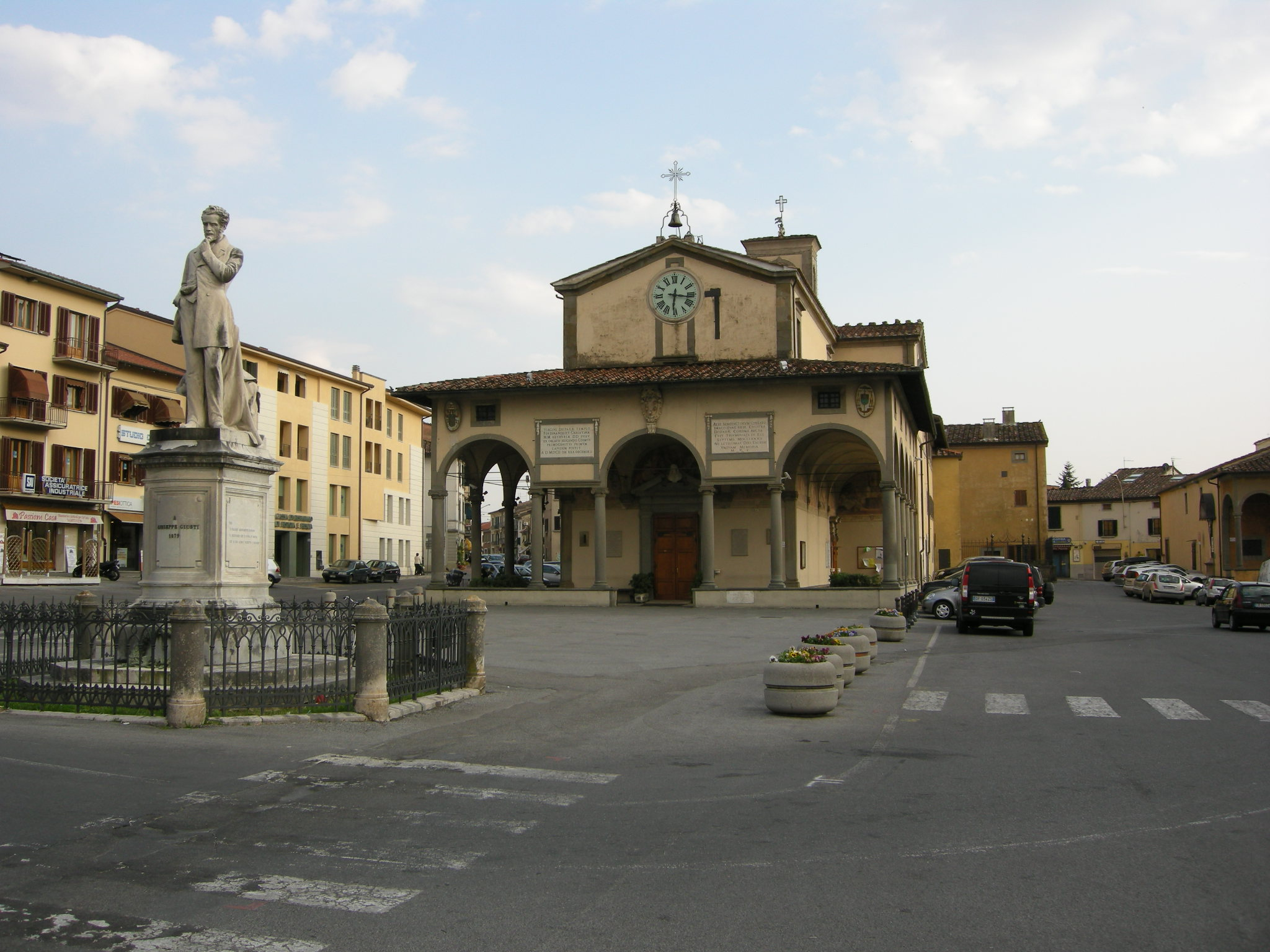
- Piazza Giusti, Monsummano Terme

- Coat of arms

- Location within Italy Location within Tuscany
- Coordinates: 43°52′N 10°49′E
- Country: Italy
- Region: Tuscany
- Province: Pistoia (PT)
- Frazioni: Bizzarrino, Cintolese, Grotta Giusti, Grotta Parlanti, Le Case, Monsummano Alto, Montevettolini, Pozzarello, Uggia, Violi

Government
  - Mayor: Simona de Caro

Area
  - Total: 32.62 km^{2} (12.59 sq mi)
- Elevation: 20 m (66 ft)

Population (31 October 2017)
  - Total: 21,138
  - Density: 648.0/km^{2} (1,678/sq mi)
- Demonym: Monsummanesi
- Time zone: UTC+1 (CET)
  - Summer (DST): UTC+2 (CEST)
- Postal code: 51015
- Dialing code: 0572
- Patron saint: Maria SS. della Fontenova
- Saint day: 9 June
- Website: Official website

Monsummano Terme is an comune located in the Province of Pistoia, Tuscany, central Italy. It is located in the Valdinievole, and is a popular spa resort.

It is composed of two separate nuclei: Monsummano Alto, of Etruscan origins and with a castle (probably of Lombard origins) and a line of walls, overlook the lower Monsummano, built starting from 1602 around a sanctuary commissioned by Ferdinand I, Grand Duke of Tuscany.

It was the birthplace of French actor Yves Montand and Italian poet Giuseppe Giusti.

== Geography ==
The district is located in the central-eastern Valdinievole, and is bordered to the north by the hills of Montalbano, to the south by the wetland Padule di Fucecchio, to the west by the Piana di Lucca, and to the east by the semi-hilly areas the town of Larciano.

Given the proximity to the Padule, the area displays a wealth of flora and fauna and is a meeting place for birdwatchers. The rivers are very short, of which the Candalla stream is the most prominent, flowing through the city center. The mountains are formed from the Montalbano chain, in which Vinci is located, and Monsummano Alto, which is 340 metres (1,120 ft), known for the unmistakable shape for its quarries, now disused, which have given unnaturally steep slopes on the mountain.

== History ==
In Etruscan and Roman times, the Valdinievole was classified as a transit site, with some sacred resting places, as evidenced by a bronze piece of art from the 3rd century BC promachos of Hercules, found in 1887 at Castelmartini and today can be found at the city's museum. Going back to the Roman archeological sites (Villa San Paolo at Pozzarello, Vaiano and Segalare), on the slopes of Monte Albano.

The settlement of the castle of Monsummano Alto is documented from 1260, but probably existed since the previous century, or, as some have suggested due to the topology from the Lombard era. The castle was at the center of battles between Florence and Lucca, with its final conquest in 1331. The flat area was swampy (which can still be seen today through the Fucecchio Padule, close by), which became a human settlement in the second half of the 16th century with the construction of several farms and houses. The lower section of the town dates mainly to the seventeenth century, when, after the miraculous apparition of the Virgin on 9 June 1573, the Grand Duke Ferdinand I of Tuscany started the construction of the Sanctuary of Our Lady of Fontenuova (1602-1605) as well as other buildings for the reception of pilgrims, such as Osteria dei Pellegrini, now the city's Museum.

During the 19th century Monsummano Terme was home of writer and former fascist politician Ferdinando Martini (his former Villa Renatico-Martini is now houses the Museum of Contemporary Art and of the Twentieth Century, and museum dedicated to the patriotic poet Giuseppe Giusti. His birthplace and a memorial at the center of the square have both become dedicated to him. The monument also symbolizes his distaste for the clergy, showing the poet facing way from the church.

The city, after a flow emigration with the advent of Fascism, became a place of immigration in the years 1951–61, mainly from southern Italy, passing rapidly from 9,708 residents (in 1951) to 11,631 (1961), due to the footwear sectors rise.

== Main sights ==
Monsummano, as well as being the center of one of the most important Italian footwear districts in the past (from the 1920s and even parts of the 19th century), is a spa town with two natural caves: Grotta Giusti and Grotta Parlanti, the latter recently undergoing renovation following the closure.

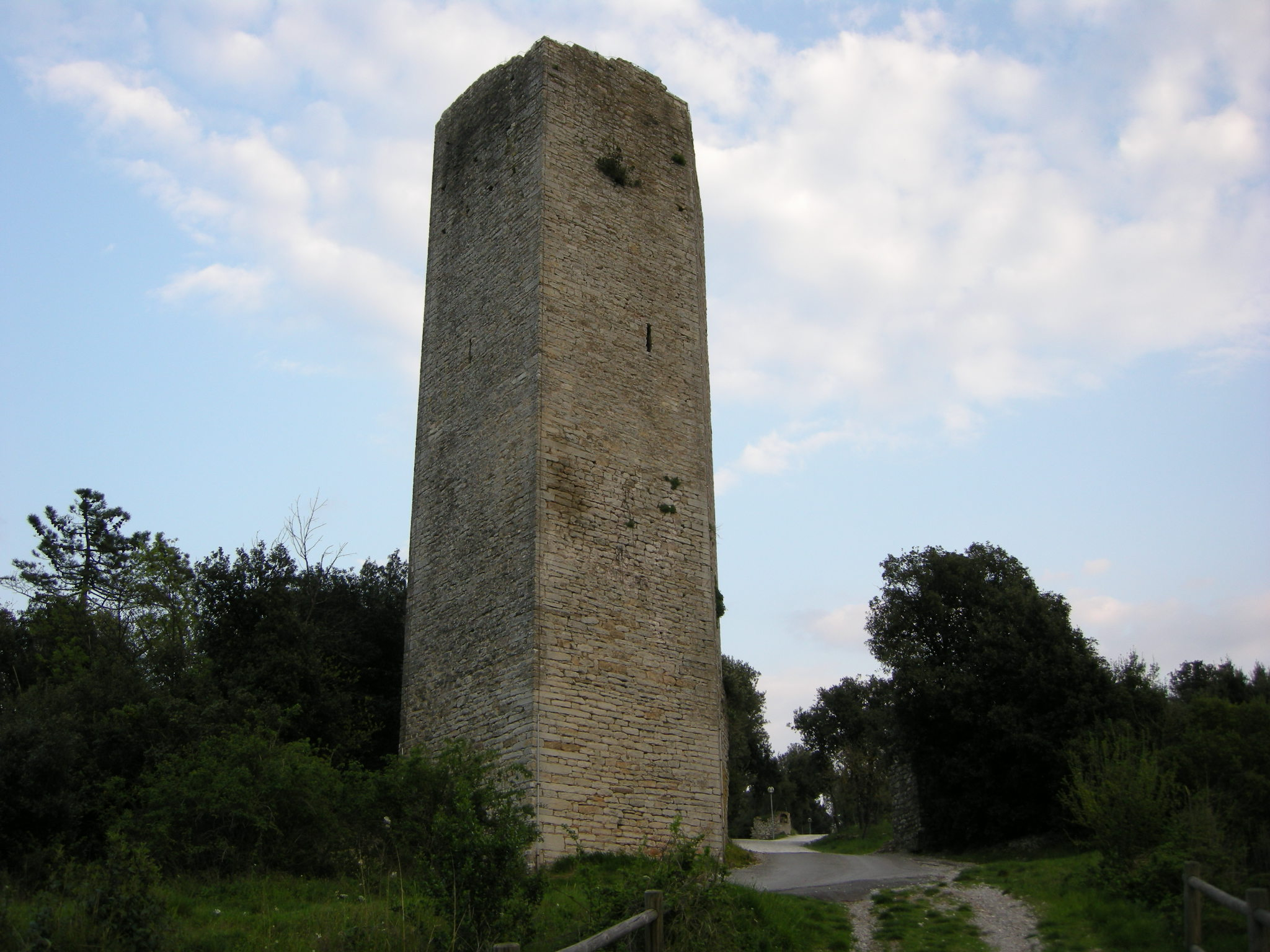
Tower of the di Monsummano Alto castle.

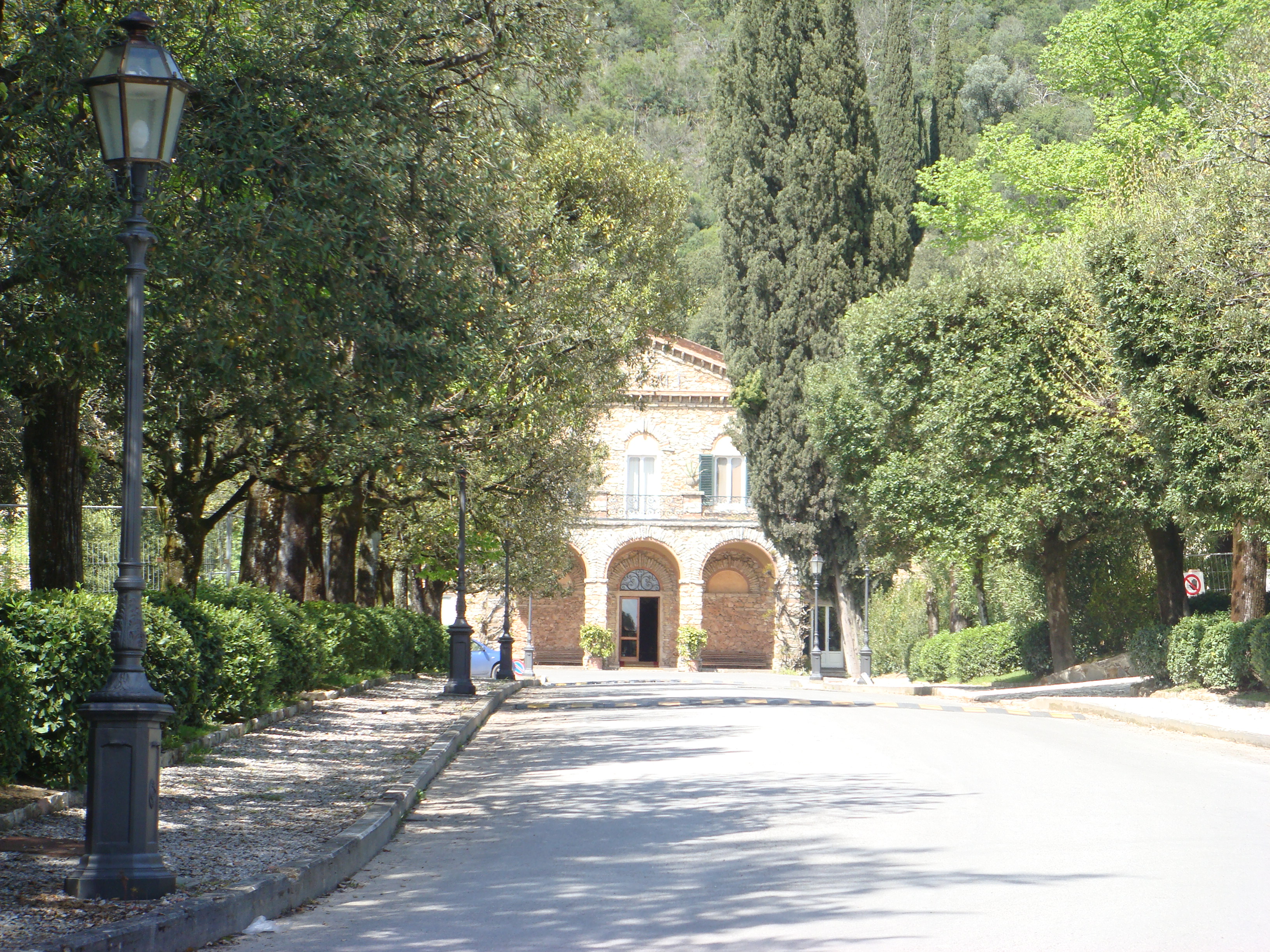
Entrance to the Grotta Giusti spa.

Other sights include:

- The medieval castle and fortifications. The elliptical shape have led to suppose a Lombard origin, but the castle is mentioned for the first time in the 11th century. It was occupied by the Florentines in 1314, but was recaptured one year later by Castruccio Castracani after the battle of Montecatini. Florence recaptured it in 1331. Of the castle today several gates and long stretches of the walls, partly covered by vegetation, as well as a single tower, remain.
- Church of San Nicolao (12th century), included in the castle. It houses a 14th- to 15th-century wooden crucifix.
- Sanctuary of Maria Santissima della Fontenuova (17th century). This sanctuary was built in 1602 by the Grand Duke Ferdinand I De Medici and is the located at the heart of Monsummano Terme. Grand Duke Ferdinand I appointed the construction of the Sanctuary exactly where the miraculous spring appeared.
- San Michele e Lorenzo; Church has a lunette painted by Giusto Utens and a Madonna with Child and Saints attributed by some to Piero di Cosimo.
- Villa medicea di Montevettolini. Located in the city of Montevettolini, it was founded around 1600 by architect Gherardo Mechini.
- Grotta Giusti, thermal spa and resort
- Theater Yves Montand
- Trekking and birdwatching site on Monsummano hills next to Grotta Giusti Thermal Spa & Resort
- Villa Renatico Martini

== People ==
- Giuseppe Giusti, poet
- Ferdinando Martini, writer and politician
- Yves Montand (Ivo Livi), singer, actor
- Fabio Galante, football player
- Giampaolo Pazzini, football player

== Twin towns ==
- Décines-Charpieu, France

== See also ==
- Audio Analogue
- Polli (company)

== Sources ==
- Rauty, Natale (1989). Monsummano dalle origini all'età comunale. Pistoia: Società pistoiese di storia patria.
- Rauty, Natale (1986). L'archivio del comune di Monsummano Terme. Monsummano Terme: Assessorato alla cultura of Monsummano Terme.
