= Jacopo Gasparini =

Italian diplomat

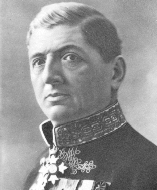
Jacopo Gasparini

Jacopo Gasparini (March 23, 1879 – May 16, 1941) was an Italian Governor of Eritrea. He was a recipient of the Order of Saints Maurice and Lazarus. He was an officer of the Legion of Honour.

Preceded by Giovanni Cerrina Feroni	Italian Governor of Eritrea; 1923–1928	Succeeded by Corrado Zoli
