= Giovanni Cerrina Feroni =

Italian soldier and colonial governor

Italian Governor of Eritrea
- In office August 17, 1915 – September 16, 1916
- Preceded by: Giuseppe Salvago Raggi
- Succeeded by: Giacomo De Martino

Italian Governor of Somalia
- In office 1916–1919
- Preceded by: Giacomo De Martino
- Succeeded by: Carlo Riveri

Italian Governor of Eritrea
- In office April 14, 1921 – June 1, 1923
- Preceded by: Ludovico Pollera
- Succeeded by: Jacopo Gasparini

Personal details
- Born: July 8, 1866 Florence
- Died: July 2, 1952 (aged 85) Rome

Giovanni Cerrina Feroni (18 July 1866 – 2 July 1952) was an Italian soldier. He was twice colonial governor of Eritrea and also a governor of Italian Somaliland.

== Life ==
Giovanni Cerrina Feroni was born in a noble family of Florence in 1866. He went to the "Italian Navy Academy" and graduated as the best student.

At the outbreak of the Italo-Turkish War, Cerrina Feroni obtained the command of the Italian naval forces stationed in the Red Sea. Also in these operations the commander Cerrina proved skilled as he managed to convince the sheikhs of Yemen to rebel against the Ottoman Empire, obtaining new allies and always putting in greater difficulty the enemy, until May 6, 1912, when the Italian fleet won the Turkish one in the Battle of Kunfuda Bay (today Al Qunfudhah). It was an operation that earned Cerrina Feroni the appointment as "Officer of the Military Order of Savoy".

At the end of this clash, the Italian Prime Minister Giovanni Giolitti personally requested the captain Cerrina asking him to perform on behalf of the government some secret diplomacy missions in 1913. Subsequently, Cerrina Feroni passed to the "Ministry of the Colonies", where he remained for several years, first as governor of Eritrea and then going to the same office in Somalia (from 1916 to 1920).

During WW1 he was appointed governor of Eritrea from 17 August 1915 to 16 September 1916; he did a second term in Asmara from 14 April 1921 to 1 June 1923.

In the following years he went up to the rank of Vice admiral.

When he returned to the civil life, he accepted the role of President of the "Istituto per l'Africa italiana" in Rome.

He died in the capital of Italy in 1952.

Preceded by Giuseppe Salvago Raggi	Italian Governor of Eritrea; 1915–1916	Succeeded by Giacomo De Martino
Preceded by Giacomo De Martino	Italian Governor of Somaliland; 1916–1919	Succeeded by Carlo Riveri
Preceded by Ludovico Pollera	Italian Governor of Eritrea; 1921–1923	Succeeded by Jacopo Gasparini

== Awards ==
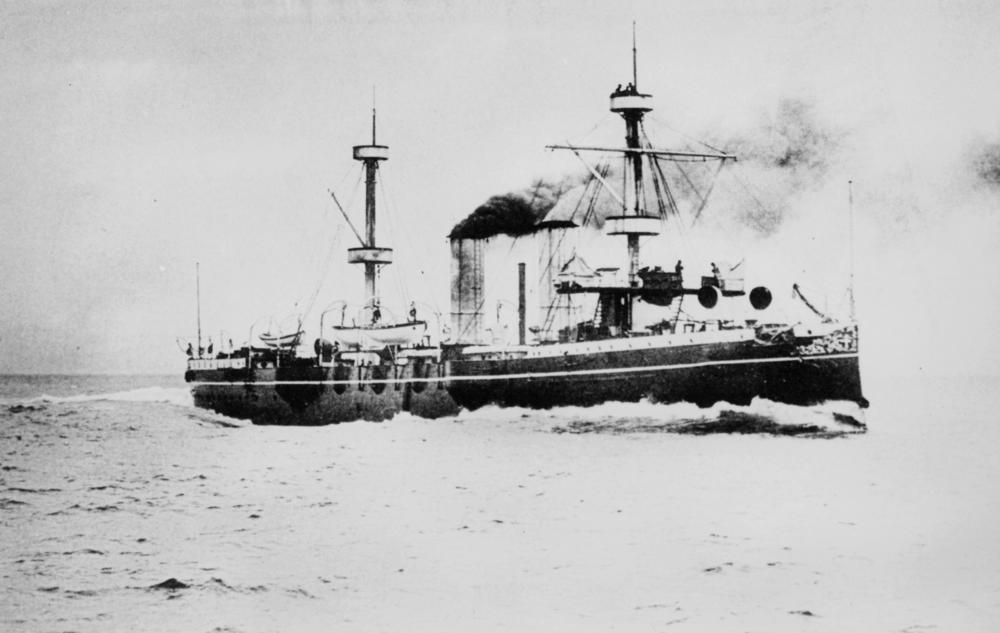
Photo of the "Piemonte" ship commanded by Cerrina Feroni in the Battle of Kunfuda Bay

- - Ufficiale dell'Ordine militare di Savoia
- - "Mauriziana" Medal
- - Medal (Italo-Turkish War)
- - Medal for Allies victory in WW1

== See also ==
- List of colonial governors of Italian Somaliland
- List of colonial governors of Italian Eritrea

== Bibliography ==
- Bandini, Franco. Gli italiani in Africa, storia delle guerre coloniali 1882-1943. Longanesi. Milano, 1971.
