= Ferdinando Martini =

Italian writer and politician

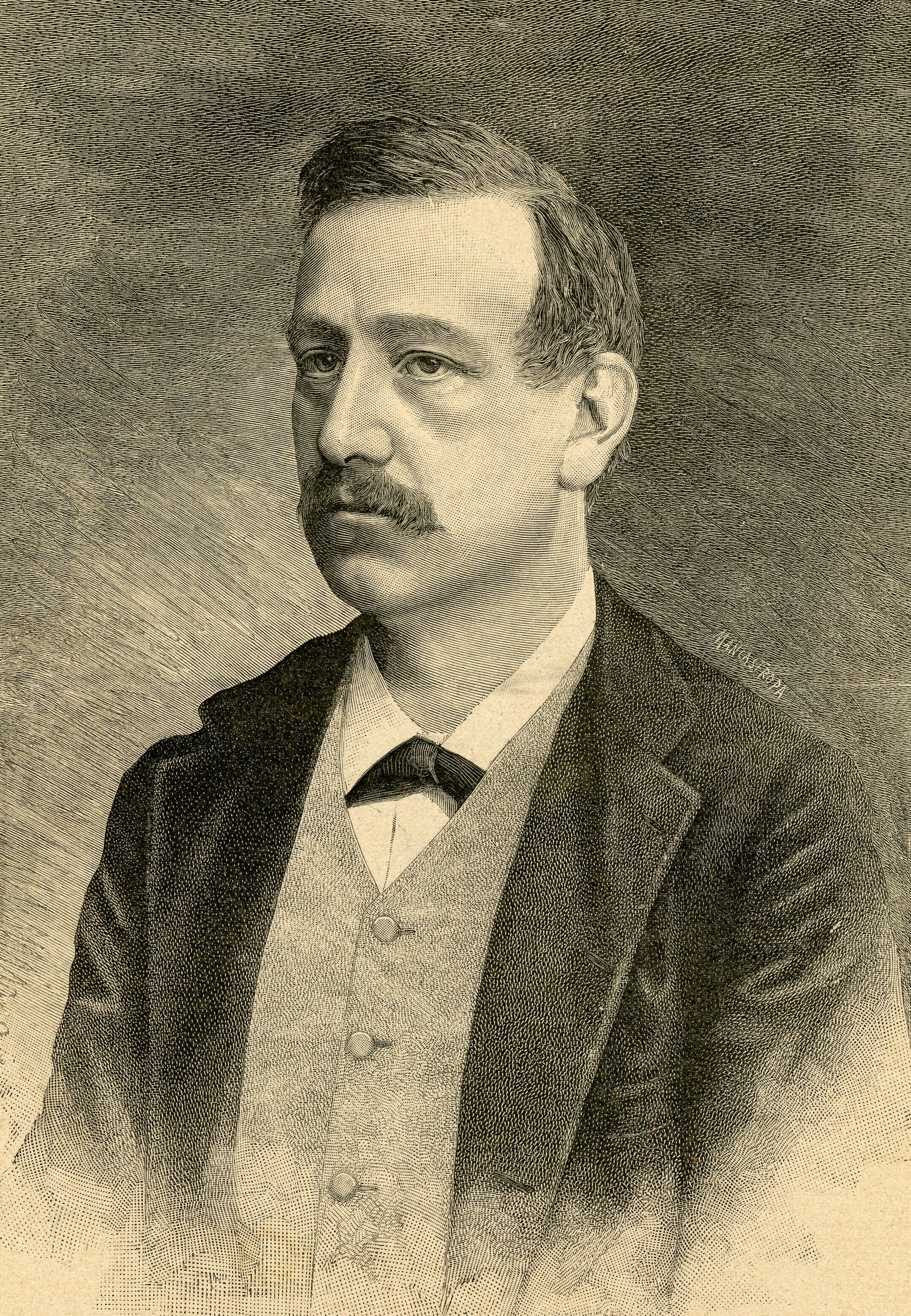

Governor of Italian Eritrea
- In office 16 December 1897 – 25 March 1907
- Preceded by: Antonio Baldissera
- Succeeded by: Giuseppe Salvago Raggi

Personal details
- Born: 30 July 1840 Florence, Grand Duchy of Tuscany
- Died: 24 April 1928 (aged 87) Monsummano Terme, Tuscany, Italy
- Party: Constitutional Democratic
- Spouse: Giacinta Marescotti

Ferdinando Martini (30 July 1840 – 24 April 1928) was an Italian writer and politician who served as the governor of Italian Eritrea from 1897 to 1907. He was a member of the Chamber of Deputies.

== Early life ==
Ferdinando Martini was born in Florence, Grand Duchy of Tuscany, on 30 July 1840, to Marianna and Vincenzo Martini. His father was the Secretary General of Finance for Tuscany. His mother died from cholera when he was 14, and his father died in 1862.

Martini performed poorly in school and did not attend university. The University of Padua gave him an honorary degree. He was a member of the Freemasons.

== Career ==
=== Literary ===
Martini won an award for his comedy I nuovi ricchi in 1863. Martini edited the dramatic works of his father in 1876. He founded Fanfulla della domenica in 1879, and Domenica letteraria in 1882.

The memoirs Giuseppe Giusti, which were written from 1845 to 1849, were published by Martini in 1890. In 1918, he published the diary of Count Luigi Passcrini de Rilli. Martini published his autobiography in 1922.

=== Political ===
In the 1874 election, Martini ran for a seat in the Chamber of Deputies for the Pescia, but lost in the runoff; the election in that district was later annulled. He won an 1875 by-election by 20 votes, but this was annulled again. He won the election by 16 votes on 30 January 1876, and received almost 90% of the vote in the general election later that year. He won in the 1880 election by three votes.

Martini joined the Constitutional Democratic Party in 1913. He lost in the 1919 election.

Martini was the Minister of Public Education from 1892 to 1893. In 1910, Martini was appointed as Italy's ambassador to Argentina. From 1915 to 1916, Martini was the Minister of the Colonies. Martini was appointed to the Senate of the Kingdom of Italy in 1923.

=== Eritrea ===
Martini supported Italy's colonial ventures in Africa as he believed that the plentiful lands were not being properly used by the indigenous people. However, when he became governor of Italian Eritrea, he pushed for it to be used for raw materials rather than settlement.

Before the outbreak of the First Italo-Ethiopian War, Martini warned the Italian government that they did not have enough soldiers to properly conduct the campaign. He later noted that the British were able to conduct their campaign against the Mahdist State as they had a large base in Egypt, which the Italians lacked for a campaign against Ethiopia.

On 30 November 1897, Martini was appointed as governor of Italian Eritrea. He was the first civilian governor of Italian Eritrea. He served as governor until 1907.

A significant number of the Italians who immigrated to the colony returned home, which the Italian government was paying for. Martini issued an order on 1 December 1898, which required immigrants to provide a certificate proving that they had the means to sustain themselves in the colony and that they would cover at least half of the cost to repatriate themselves to Italy. Italian workers were required to contribute 10% of their salary for a fund to cover their repatriation up until it reached 250 Italian lire.

== Personal life ==
Martini married Giacinta Marescotti in 1866. Martini died in Monsummano Terme on 25 April 1928. His manuscripts were given to the National Central Library.

== Political positions ==
Martini supported universal suffrage starting in 1881, and supported women's suffrage. He supported Italy joining World War I on the side of the Triple Entente. He supported the Manifesto of the Fascist Intellectuals.

== Literary works ==
- Chi sa il gioco non l'insegni (1871)
- Il peggio passo è quello dell'uscio' (1873)
- Fra un cigaro e l'altro (1876)
- Di palo in frasca (1891)
- Nell'Affrica Italiana, Impressioni e Ricord (1891)
- Al teatro (1895)
- Cose africane, da Saati ad Abba Carima, discorsi e scritti (1896)
- Sympathies. Studies and memories (1900)
- Pagine collezioni (1912)
- Relazione sulla Colonia Eritrea del regio Commissario civile (1902-1907) (1913)
- Confessioni e ricordi (1922)
- Diario Eritreo (1942)
- Diario 1914-1918 (1966)

== Works cited ==
=== Journals ===
- "Obituaries". Italica. 5 (2). University of Illinois Press: 51. 1928. doi:10.2307/475399. JSTOR 475399.
- Bellucci, Stefano; Zacearia, Massimo (2014). "Wage Labor and Mobility in Colonial Eritrea, 1880s to 1920s". International Labor and Working-Class History (86). Cambridge University Press: 89–106. doi:10.2307/43302767. JSTOR 43302767.
- Camilleri, Nicola (2020). "Colonial Subjects and Others: Racism and Inequality during Italian Rule in the Horn of Africa". Northeast African Studies. 20 (1). Michigan State University Press: 27–58.
- Mazzoni, Guido (1928). "Ferdinando Martini". Archivio Storico Italiano. 10 (7). Casa Editrice Leo S. Olschki: 333–337. doi:10.2307/26240695. JSTOR 26240695.
- Mohanty, Pramod; Andemichael, Aron (2010). "Colonialism and Land in Africa: A Case of Italian Land Policy in Eritrean Highlands". Proceedings of the Indian History Congress. 71. Indian History Congress: 950–958. doi:10.2307/44147563. JSTOR 44147563.
- Romandini, Massimo (1983). "Da Adua Al Governo Civile In Eritrea Nelle Considerazioni Di Ferdinando Martini". Africa. 38 (4). University of Pavia: 628–646. doi:10.2307/40759671. JSTOR 40759671.
- Romandini, Massimo (1980). "Ferdinando Martini E La Crisi Tigrina Del 1898-99". Africa. 35 (1). University of Pavia: 125–132. doi:10.2307/40759266. JSTOR 40759266.
- Solinas, Pier (1988). "Coscienza coloniale e affari indigeni. L'Africa italiana da Ferdinando Martini a Giacomo De Martino". La Ricerca Folklorica. 18. Grafo Spa: 41–47. doi:10.2307/1479270. JSTOR 1479270.
- Strowel, Marie-Pierre (1994). "Carlo Placci between Italy and Britain in the 1880s: His Friends, His Essays and the Role of Enrico Nencioni". Modern Language Review. 89 (1). Modern Humanities Research Association: 71–87. doi:10.2307/3733154. JSTOR 3733154.

=== Web ===
- "Martini, Ferdinando". Treccani. Archived from the original on 15 July 2025.
- "Martini, Ferdinando". Treccani. 2008. Archived from the original on 15 July 2025.

Political offices
Preceded by Antonio Baldissera	Governor of Eritrea; 1897–1907	Succeeded by Giuseppe Salvago Raggi
Preceded by Pietro Bertolini	Italian Minister of Colonies; 1914–1916	Succeeded by Gaspare Colosimo
