= List of buildings and structures in Eritrea =

A list of notable buildings and structures in Eritrea:

Name	Location	Type	Date	Notes/References
Administration Building of the Anseba Region	Keren	Government building	20th century	
Asmara International Airport	Asmara; 15.291853°N 38.910667°E	Airport	20th century	Also a base of the Eritrean Air Force.
Asmara Intercontinental Hotel	Asmara; 15.3129194°N 38.9057823°E	Hotel	20th century	Now the Asmara Palace Hotel.
Asmara Opera	Asmara; 15.3358°N 38.9352°E	Performance hall	1918	Enlarged in 1936.
Bank of Eritrea	Asmara; 15.338056°N 38.935556°E	Government building.	1914	Serves as the national bank of Eritrea.
Cicero Stadium	Asmara; 15.349272°N 38.921256°E	Multi-purpose stadium	1938	
Cinema Impero	Asmara; 15.336667°N 38.940278°E	Performance hall	1937	Built in the Italian art-deco style.
Commercial Bank of Eritrea, Keren	Keren; 15.780869°N 38.458361°E	Bank	20th century	
Denden Stadium	Asmara; 15.3435°N 38.925639°E	Multi-purpose stadium	1958	Later enlarged.
Enda Mariam Cathedral	Asmara; 15.3397306°N 38.9421477°E	Religious building	1922	A structure of the Eritrean Orthodox Tewahedo Church.
Fiat Tagliero Building	Asmara; 15.328333°N 38.925833°E	Filling station	1938	A service station built in the Futurist style by Giuseppe Pettazzi. Now unused.
Governor's Palace, Asmara	Asmara; 15.336111°N 38.941389°E	Government building	1930s	Built in the Italian Fascist art-deco style.
Great Mosque of Asmara	Asmara; 15.338889°N 38.941667°E	Religious building	1938	Also known as Al Kulafah Al Rashidan.
National Museum of Eritrea	Asmara; 15.333333°N 38.927222°E	Museum	1930s	Originally located in the former Governor's Palace.
President's Office	Asmara; 15.3362°N 38.9314°E	Government building	1897	Also served as a National Museum by Ethiopia in the 1950s
Church of Our Lady of the Rosary	Asmara; 15.336667°N 38.937778°E	Religious building	1922	Was principal church of the former Apostolic Vicariate of Asmara.
University of Asmara	Asmara; 15.3425°N 38.9275°E	Educational building	1958	Founded as the Catholic College of Santa Famiglia.
World Bank Building, Asmara	Asmara	Government building	20th century	Formerly an Italian villa.
