= Italian Eritreans =

Italian community in Eritrea

Italo-eritrei (Italian)
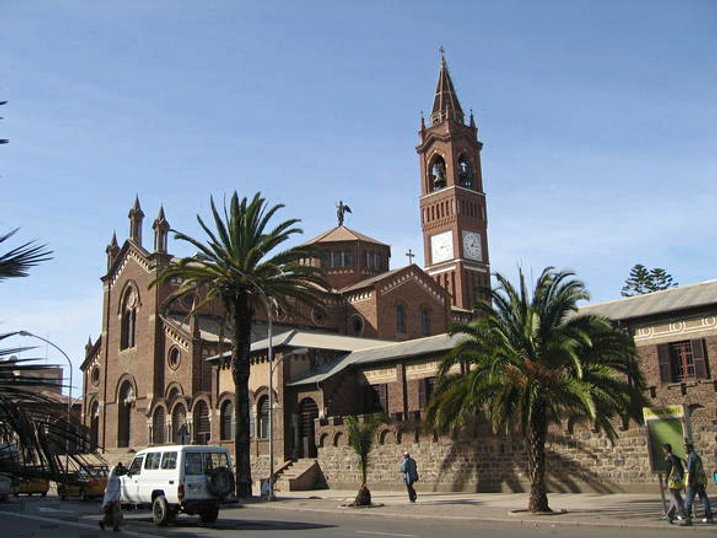
- Church of Our Lady of the Rosary, Asmara, built by the Italians in 1923 and now meeting place of the remaining Eritrean Italians

Total population
- 100,000 descendants in 2008; 1,100 in 2024 (Italian nationals).

Regions with significant populations
- Asmara, Massawa and Keren

Languages
- Italian, Tigrinya

Religion
- Christian, mostly Roman Catholic, minority of Eritrean Orthodox Tewahedo Church.

Related ethnic groups
- Italians, Italian Algerians, Italian Angolans, Italian Egyptians, Italian Ethiopians, Italian Libyans, Italian Moroccans, Italian Mozambicans, Italian Somalis, Italian South Africans, Italian Tunisians, Italian Zimbabweans

Italian Eritreans (or Eritrean Italians, Italian: Italo-eritrei) are Eritrean-born citizens who are fully or partially of Italian descent, whose ancestors were Italians who emigrated to Eritrea during the Italian diaspora, or Italian-born people in Eritrea.

== History ==
Their ancestry dates back from the beginning of the Italian colonization of Eritrea at the end of the 19th century, but only during 1930s they settled in large numbers. In the 1939 census of Eritrea there were more than 76,000 Eritrean Italians, most of them living in Asmara (53,000 out of the city's total of 93,000). Many Italian settlers got out of their colony after its conquest by the Allies in November 1941 and they were reduced to only 38,000 by 1946. This also includes a population of mixed Italian and Eritrean descent; most Italian Eritreans still living in Eritrea are from this mixed group.

Although many of the remaining Italians stayed during the decolonization process after World War II and are actually assimilated to the Eritrean society, a few are stateless today, as none of them were given citizenship unless through marriage or, more rarely, by having it conferred upon them by the State.

=== The Italian colony of Eritrea ===
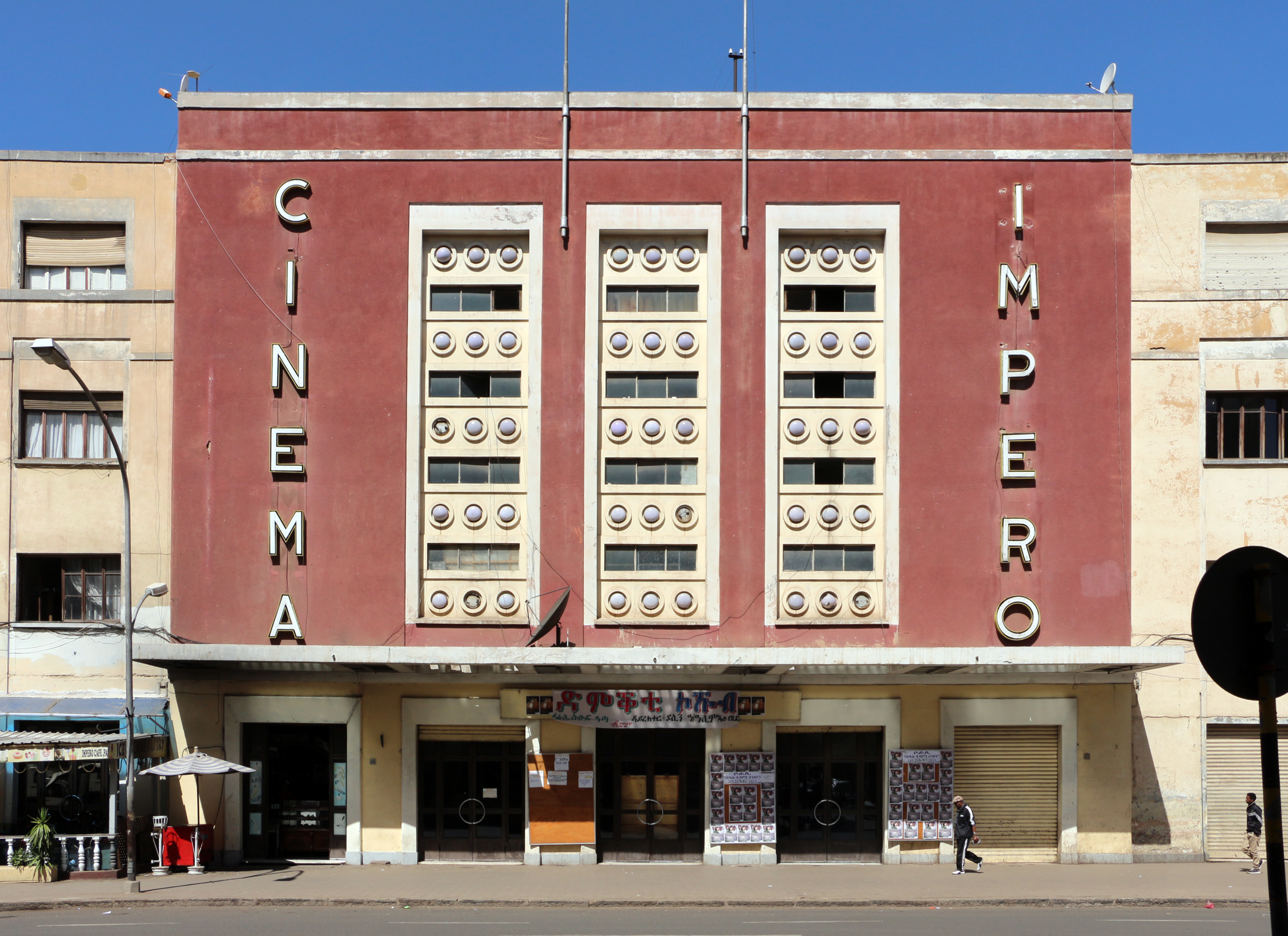
Asmara's Cinema Impero was built in 1937. It is widely considered a masterpiece of Italian Art-Deco architecture.

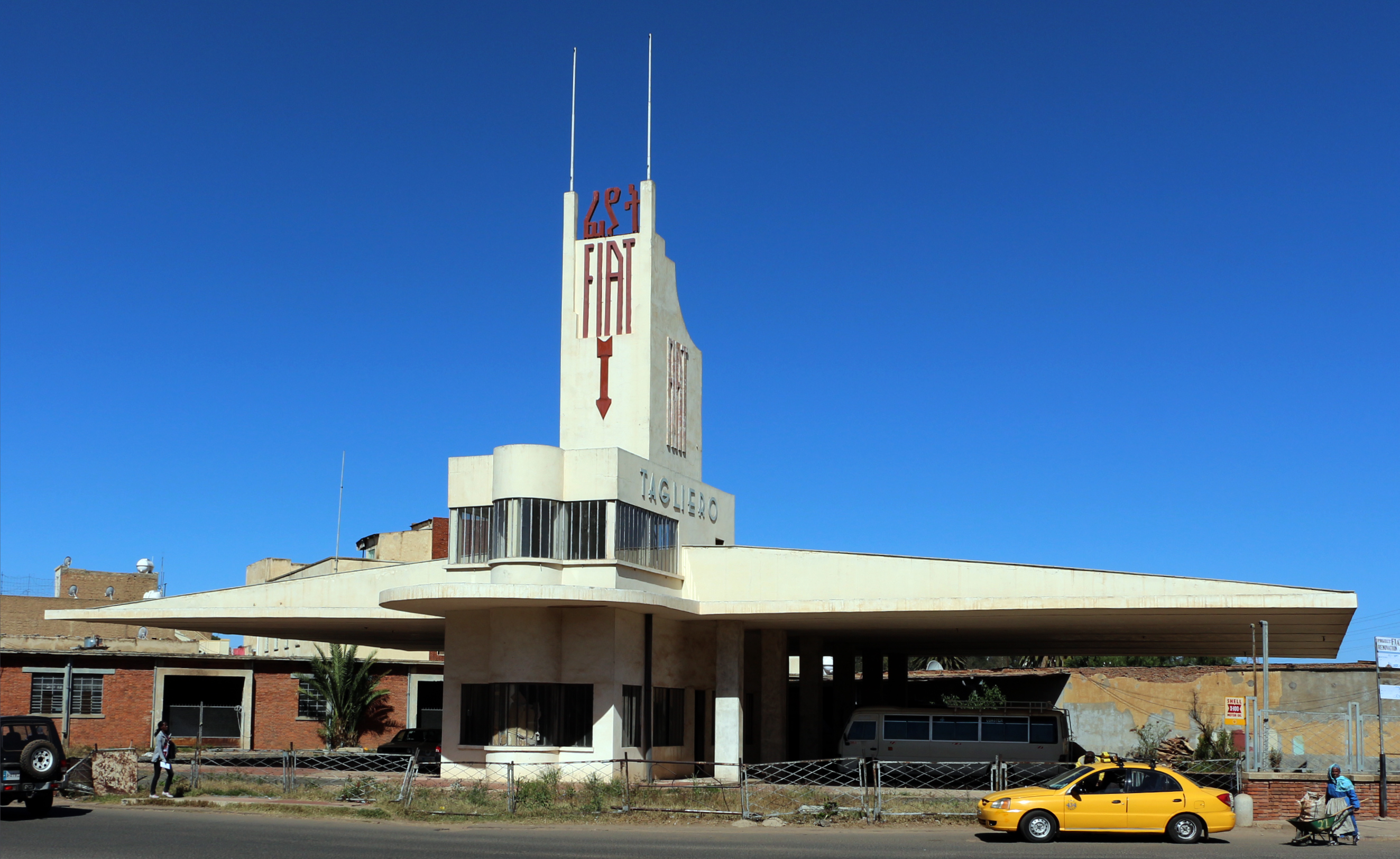
Asmara's Fiat Tagliero Building was built in 1938. It is a Futurist-style service station designed by the Italian engineer Giuseppe Pettazzi.

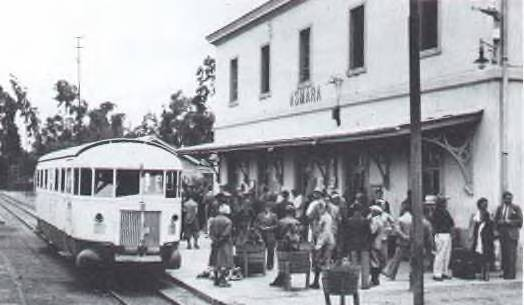
The railway station of Asmara in 1938, with passengers boarding a Littorina

From 1882 to 1941 Eritrea was ruled by the Kingdom of Italy. In those sixty years Eritrea was populated - mainly in the area of Asmara - by groups of Italian colonists, who moved there from the beginning of the 20th century.

The Italian Eritreans grew from 4,000 during World War I to nearly 100,000 at the beginning of World War II.

Italian administration of Eritrea brought some of their own methods in the medical and agricultural sectors of Eritrean society (i.e. other access to sanitary and hospital services in the urban areas).

Furthermore, the Italians employed many Eritreans in public service (in particular in the police and public works departments) and oversaw the provision of urban amenities in Asmara and Massawa. In a region marked by cultural, linguistic, and religious diversity, a succession of Italian governors maintained a notable degree of unity and public order. The Italians also built many major infrastructural projects in Eritrea, including the Asmara-Massawa Cableway and the Eritrean Railway.

Benito Mussolini's rise to power in Italy in 1922 brought profound changes to the colonial government in Eritrea. Mussolini established the Italian Empire in May 1936. The fascists imposed harsh rule that stressed the political and racial superiority of Italians. Eritreans were demoted to menial positions in the public sector in 1938.

Eritrea was chosen by the Italian government to be the industrial center of the Italian East Africa. The Italian government continued to implement agricultural reforms but primarily on farms owned by Italian colonists (exports of coffee boomed in the thirties). In the area of Asmara there were in 1940 more than 2000 small and medium-sized industrial companies, concentrated in the areas of construction, mechanics, textiles, electricity and food processing. Consequently, Eritrea's standard of living in 1939 was considered one of the best in Africa for both the Italian colonists and the Eritreans.

The Mussolini government regarded the colony as a strategic base for future aggrandizement and ruled accordingly, using Eritrea as a base to launch its 1935–1936 campaign to colonize Ethiopia. In 1939, nearly 40% of the male Eritreans able to fight were enrolled in the colonial Italian Army: the best Italian colonial troops during World War II were the Eritrean Ascari, as stated by Italian Marshall Rodolfo Graziani and legendary officer Amedeo Guillet.

Italian Eritrean population in Eritrea, from 1910 to 2008
Year	Italian Eritreans	Eritrea population
1910	1,000 (0.26%)	390,000
1935	3,100 (0.51%)	610,000
1939	76,000 (10.27%)	740,000
1946	38,000 (4.37%)	870,000
2008	800 (0.02%)	4,500,000

=== Asmara development ===
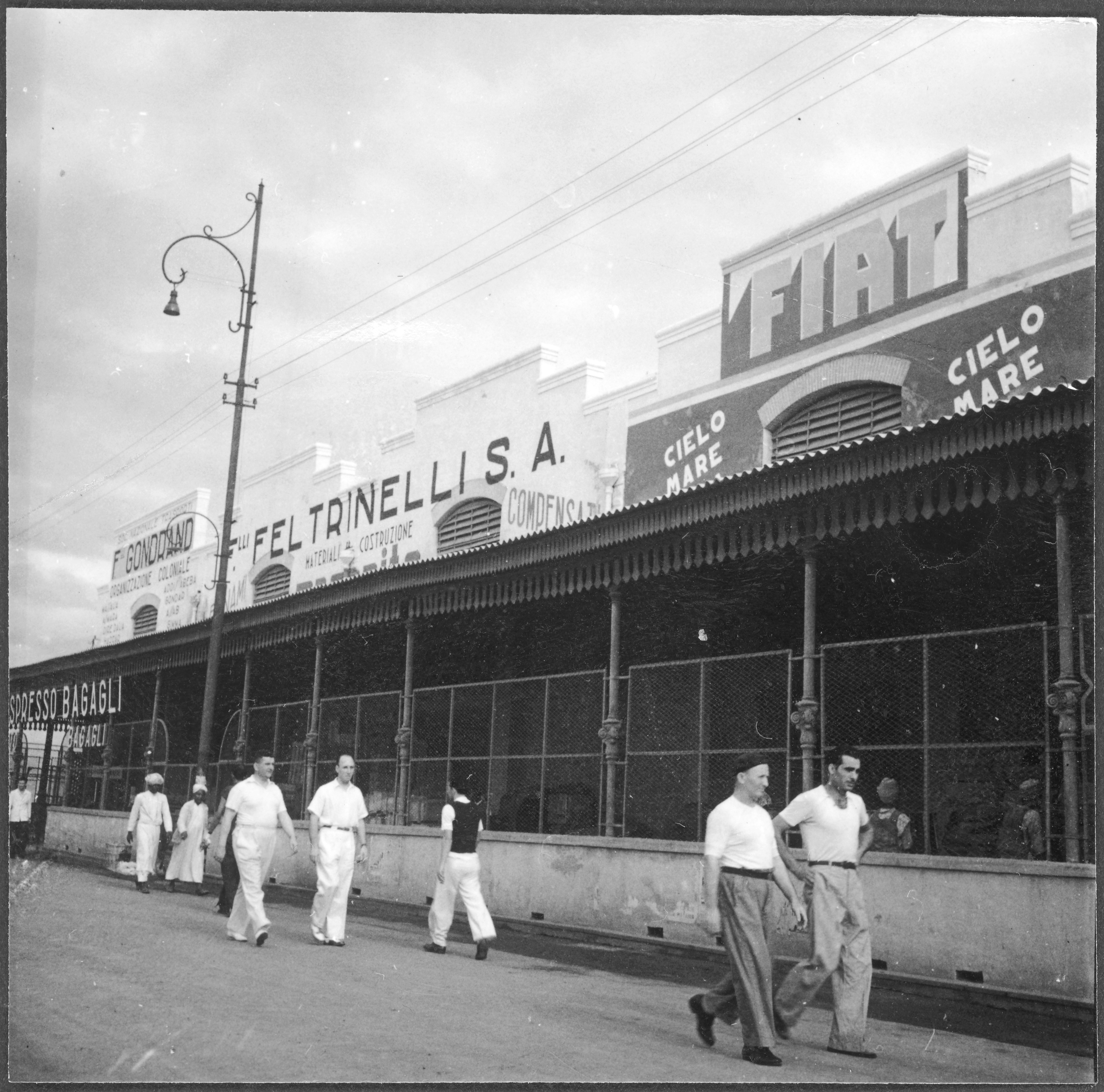
Italian settlers in Massawa

Asmara was populated by a numerous Italian community and the city acquired an Italian architectural look.

Today Asmara is worldwide known for its early 20th-century Italian buildings, including the Art Deco Cinema Impero, "Cubist" Africa Pension, eclectic Orthodox Cathedral and former Opera House, the futurist Fiat Tagliero Building, the neo-Romanesque Church of Our Lady of the Rosary, Asmara, and the neoclassical Governor's Palace. The city is littered with Italian colonial villas and mansions. Most of central Asmara was built between 1935 and 1941, so effectively the Italians designed and enabled the local Eritrean population to build almost an entire city, in just six years.

The city of Asmara had a population of 98,000, of which 53,000 were Italians according to the Italian census of 1939. This fact made Asmara the main "Italian town" of the Italian Empire in Africa. In all Eritrea the Italians were 75,000 in that year.

Numerous industrial investments were done by the Italians in the area of Asmara and Massawa, but the beginning of World War II put a halt to the Italian industrialization of Eritrea.

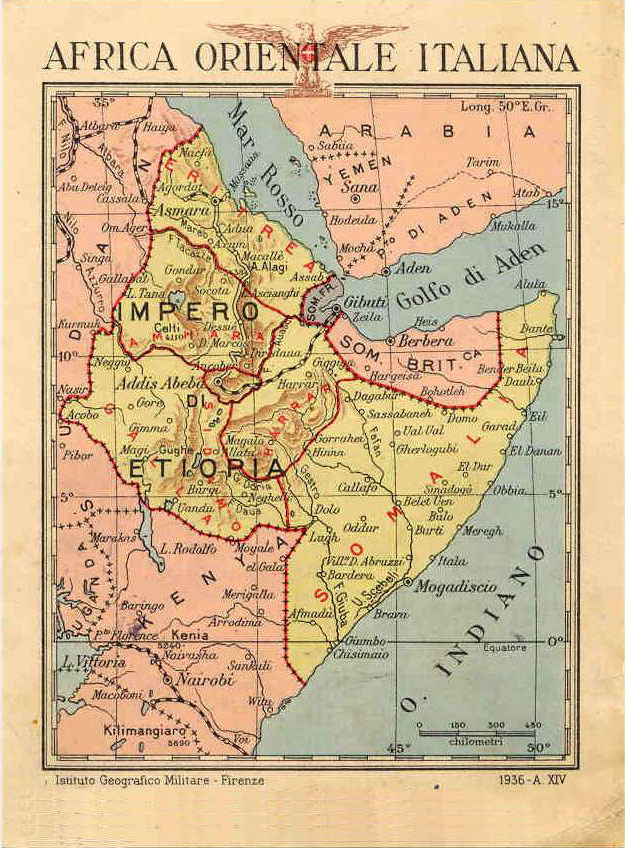
Map of the Africa Orientale Italiana: the biggest extension of Eritrea was reached during the Italian Empire (1936–1941), when northern parts of conquered Ethiopia were assigned to Eritrea by the Italians as a reward for the Eritrean "Ascari'" help in the conquest of Ethiopia

The following Italian guerrilla war against the Allies was supported by some Eritrean colonial troops until the Italian armistice in September 1943. Eritrea was placed under British military administration after the Italian surrender in World War II.

=== After World War II ===
Eritrea was placed under British military administration after the Italian surrender in the East African Campaign in World War II. The British initially maintained the Italian administration of Eritrea, but the country soon became involved in a violent struggle for independence (from the British in the late 1940s and, after 1952, from the Ethiopians, who annexed Eritrea in that year).

After the defeat of Italy, 70,000 Italian settlers remained in Eritrea. The British military administration arrested and deported substantial numbers of the settler population as they were implicated with the Italian fascist regime. Some settlers were involved in confrontations with Eritreans. The Italians in Eritrea started to move away from the country after the final defeat of the Kingdom of Italy by the Allies, and by the time of the British census of 1949 Asmara had only 17,183 Italian Eritreans of a total population of 127,579. Most Italian settlers left for Italy; others to the United States, Middle East and Australia.

During the final years of World War II, Vincenzo di Meglio had defended the Italians of Eritrea politically and successively promoted the independence of Eritrea. After the war he was named director of the Comitato Rappresentativo Italiani dell' Eritrea (CRIE). In 1947 he supported the creation of the "Associazione Italo-Eritrei" and the "Associazione Veterani Ascari" in order to ally with the Eritreans favorable to Italy in Eritrea.

He co-founded the Partito Nuova Eritrea Pro Italia (New Eritrea Pro-Italy Party) in September 1947 in Asmara as an Eritrean political party favorable to the Italian presence in Eritrea. It obtained more than 200,000 applications for membership in a single month, the majority of whom were former Italian soldiers and Eritrean Ascari. The organization was even backed by the government of Italy. The main objective of this party was Eritrean freedom, but they had a pre-condition that stated that before independence the country should be governed by Italy for at least 15 years (as would happen with Italian Somalia).

With the peace treaty of 1947, the new Italian Republic officially accepted the end of the colony. As a consequence the Italian community started to disappear, especially after the Ethiopian Empire took control of Eritrea in 1952. Some Italo-Eritrean were welcomed by the Ethiopian government, like the brothers Italo Vassalo and Luciano Vassalo, champions of football who won the 1962 African Cup of Nations, but since then the Eritrean Italians have diminished as a community and now are reduced to a few hundreds, mainly located in the capital Asmara. The most renowned of them is the professional cyclist Domenico Vaccaro, who won the last stage of the Tour of Eritrea in Asmara in April 2008.

== Language and religion ==
Most Italian Eritreans can speak Italian. The last remaining Italian-language school, the Scuola Italiana di Asmara, renowned in Eritrea for its sports activities, closed in 2020. Italian is still spoken in commerce in Eritrea.

Until 1975, there were in Asmara an Italian Lyceum, an Italian Technical Institute, an Italian Middle school and special university courses in Medicine held by Italian teachers.

Gino Corbella, an Italian consul in Asmara, estimated that the diffusion of the Italian language in Eritrea was supported even by the fact that in 1959, nearly 20,000 Eritreans were descendants of Italians who had illegitimate sons/daughters with Eritrean women during colonial times.

The assimilated Italian Eritreans of the new generations (in 2007 they numbered nearly 900 persons) speak Tigrinya and only a bit of Italian or speak Italian as second language.

Nearly all are Roman Catholic Christians of the Latin Rite, while some are converts to other denominations of Christianity.

== Prominent Italian Eritreans ==
- Ferdinando Martini, the first Governor of the Italian Eritrea.
- Luciano Violante, former President of the Italian chamber of Deputies.
- Bruno Lauzi, singer-songwriter.
- Italo Vassallo, footballer.
- Lara Saint Paul, designer.
- Marina Colasanti, writer.
- Remo Girone, actor.
- Melissa Chimenti, actress.
- Ines Pellegrini, actress.

== See also ==
- Asmara under Italy
- Asmara President's Office
- Cinema Impero
- Italian Eritrea
- Eritrean Ascari
- Fiat Tagliero Building
- Italian East Africa
- Italian Empire
- Tour of Eritrea
- Italian language in Eritrea
- Asmara circuit

== Bibliography ==
- Bandini, Franco. Gli italiani in Africa, storia delle guerre coloniali 1882-1943. Longanesi. Milano, 1971.
- Bereketeab, R. Eritrea: The making of a Nation. Uppsala University. Uppsala, 2000.
- Killinger, Charles. The History of Italy. Greenwood Press. 2002.
- Lowe, C.J. Italian Foreign Policy 1870–1940. Routledge. 2002.
- Negash, Tekeste. Italian colonialism in Eritrea 1882–1941 (Politics, Praxis and Impact). Uppsala University. Uppsala, 1987.
- Shillington, Kevin. Encyclopedia of African History. CRC Press. London, 2005. ISBN 1-57958-245-1
