= Simplified Italian of Libya =

Italian pidgin

- Pidgin italiano in Libia; Libyan Italian
- Native to: Italian Libya
- Region: Libya
- Ethnicity: Libyans, Italian Libyans
- Era: 20th century
- Language family: Italian-based pidgin

Language codes
- ISO 639-3: –
- IETF: crp-Li

Simplified Italian of Libya was an Italian pidgin in the colony of Libya, that survived until the late 20th century, mainly in the area of the capital Tripoli. It was a legacy of Italian colonial period when Libya was part of Italian North Africa. It was created in the early 1920s and lasted until the late 1990s.

== History ==
This Italian Pidgin of Libya (called sometimes "Libyan Italian") is a legacy of the Italian Empire.

Italian was the language of the Italians who settled in Libya. In 1940 nearly half the native Libyans were able to speak in Italian (and in Tripoli & Benghazi all of them) and many loanwords from Italian (nearly 800) were assimilated in the local Arab language. But since the 1920s started to be developed between the native Arab population a "Pidgin italian", with Arab and Italian words mixed (according to historian Tripodi).

Although it was greatly used by most of the Arab Libyans on the coast since colonial rule, the Pidgin Italian greatly declined under the rule of Muammar Gaddafi who expelled nearly all the Italian colonists population (and Italian-educated Libyans who were against the Gaddafi's rule). The Libyan dictator returned Arabic to be once again the sole official and common used language of the country.

Some academics think that there was fully spoken a kind of pidgin in northern Libya at the end of WW2: the Italian pidgin of Libya, spoken mainly in Tripoli and Benghazi. But with the disappearance of the Italians of Libya under Gheddafi, this pidgin is no longer in existence since the late 1980s/early 1990s.

== Characteristics ==
The Simplified Italian of Libya is similar in morphology and syntaxis to the Italian Eritrean, a pidgin developed in another colony of the kingdom of Italy: Italian Eritrea.

Like the Simplified Italian of Eritrea, the Libyan Italian "has basic SVO order; unmarked form is used for nonspecific; stare and ce (from Italian) as locatives".

Many Italian loanwords existed in this Pidgin mainly, but not exclusively, as a technical jargon. For example, machinery parts, workshop tools, electrical supplies, names of fish species ...etc.

Italian Loanwords
Italian Pidgin of Libya			Italian		
Word	IPA (Western)	IPA (Eastern)	Meaning	Word	Meaning
ṣālīṭa	[sˤɑːliːtˤa]		slope	salita	up slope
kinšēllu	[kənʃeːlːu]		metallic gate	cancello	gate
anguli	[aŋɡuli]		corner	angolo	corner
ṭānṭa, uṭānṭa	[tˤɑːntˤɑ], [utˤɑːntˤɑ]		truck	ottanta	eighty (a model of a truck of Italian make)
tēsta	[teːsta]		a hit with the forehead	testa	head
maršabēdi	[marʃabeːdi]		sidewalk	marciapiede	sidewalk
kāčču	[kɑːttʃu]		kick	calcio	kick
sbageţi, spageţi	[sbɑːɡeːtˤi, spɑːɡeːtˤi]			spaghetti	
lazānya	[lɑːzɑːnja]			lasagna	
rizoţu	[rizoːtˤu]			risotto	
feţuččini	[fetˤutˤ.ʃiːni]			fettuccine	

Libyan Italian seems to resemble the form and structure of "Creole" based forms of European languages (that loanworded during the Renaissance from medioeval Italian).

== See also ==
- Italian Eritrean
- Simplified Italian of Somalia
- Simplified Italian of Ethiopia
- Mediterranean Lingua Franca

== Bibliography ==
- Bandini, Franco. Gli italiani in Africa, storia delle guerre coloniali 1882-1943. Longanesi. Milano, 1971.
- Bender, Lionel. Pidgin and Creole languages. University of Hawaii Press. Hawaii, 1987. ISBN 9780824882150
- Hussein Ramadan, Abdu. “Italian loanwords in colloquial Libyan Arabic as spoken in the Tripoli region”. Tripoli, 2013 ( http://hdl.handle.net/10150/184333)
- Chapin Metz, Helen. Libya: A Country Study. Washington: GPO for the Library of Congress, 1987
- Tripodi, Paolo (1999). The Colonial Legacy in Somalia, Rome and Mogadishu from Colonial Administration to Operation Restore Hope. Palgrave Macmillan. ISBN 978-0333763513.
