= Cinema Impero =

Art Deco-style cinema in Asmara, Eritrea

Coordinates: 15°20′12″N 38°56′25″E

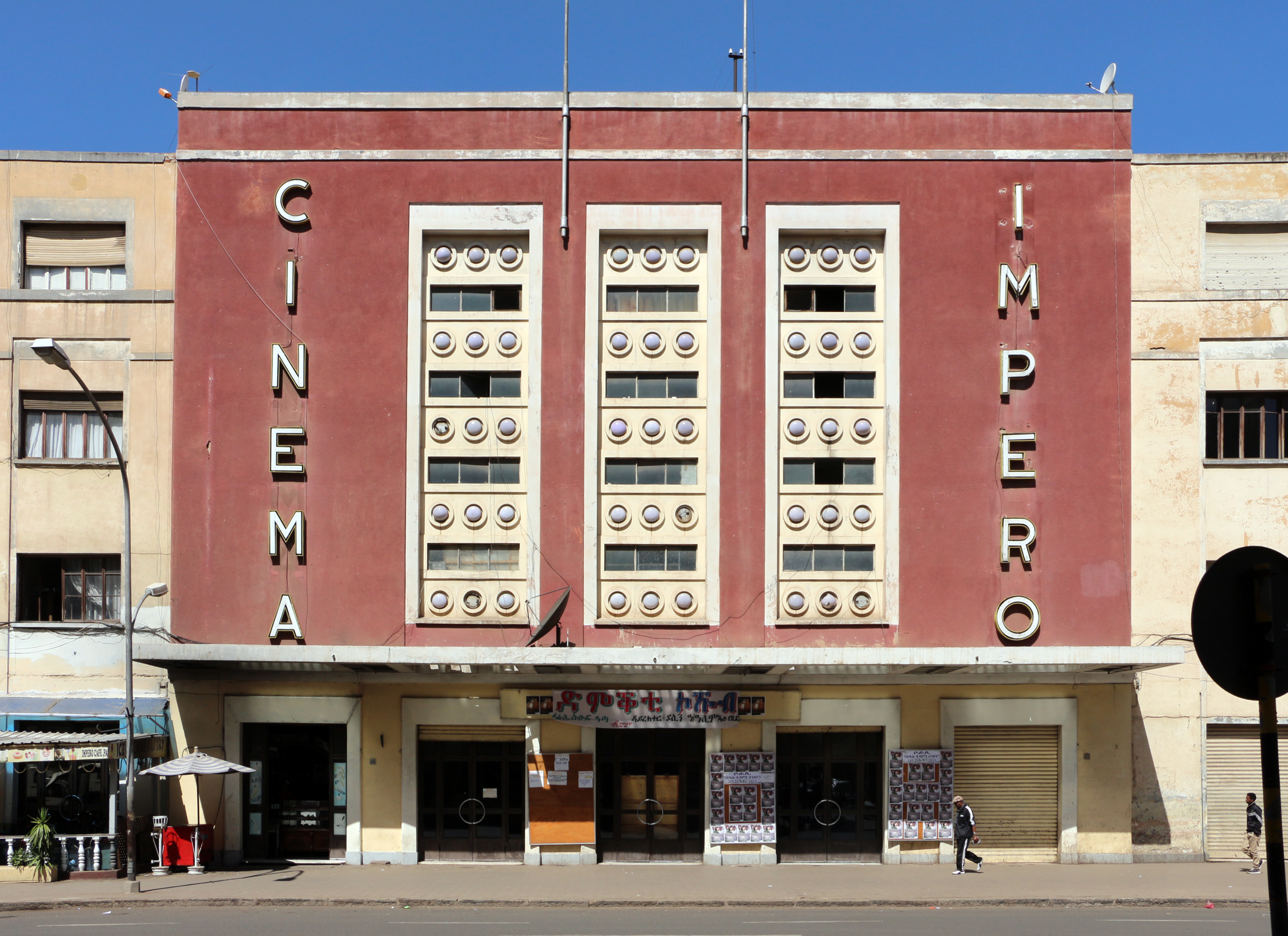
The Cinema Impero was constructed in Asmara in 1937. It is a famous example of the Art Deco style.

The Cinema Impero (lit. "Empire Cinema") is an Art Deco-style cinema in Asmara, the capital of Eritrea. It was built in 1937 by the colonial authorities in Italian Eritrea.

== History ==
Cinema Impero was the largest movie theater constructed in Asmara during the last period of the Italian colony of Eritrea. It was named after the conquest of Ethiopia by Benito Mussolini and his proclamation of the Italian Empire.

The building still houses a cinema today, and it is considered by the experts one of the world's finest examples of Art Déco style building.

Cinema Impero is still structurally sound after 70 years, escaping damage during the several conflicts that have affected the Horn of Africa over the past century.

It is a tourist attraction in modern Asmara – along with the famous Fiat Tagliero Building and some other Italian-period structures of colonial Eritrea (including the Presidential Palace and the City Hall) – that have made Asmara a World Heritage Site by the UNESCO in 2017.

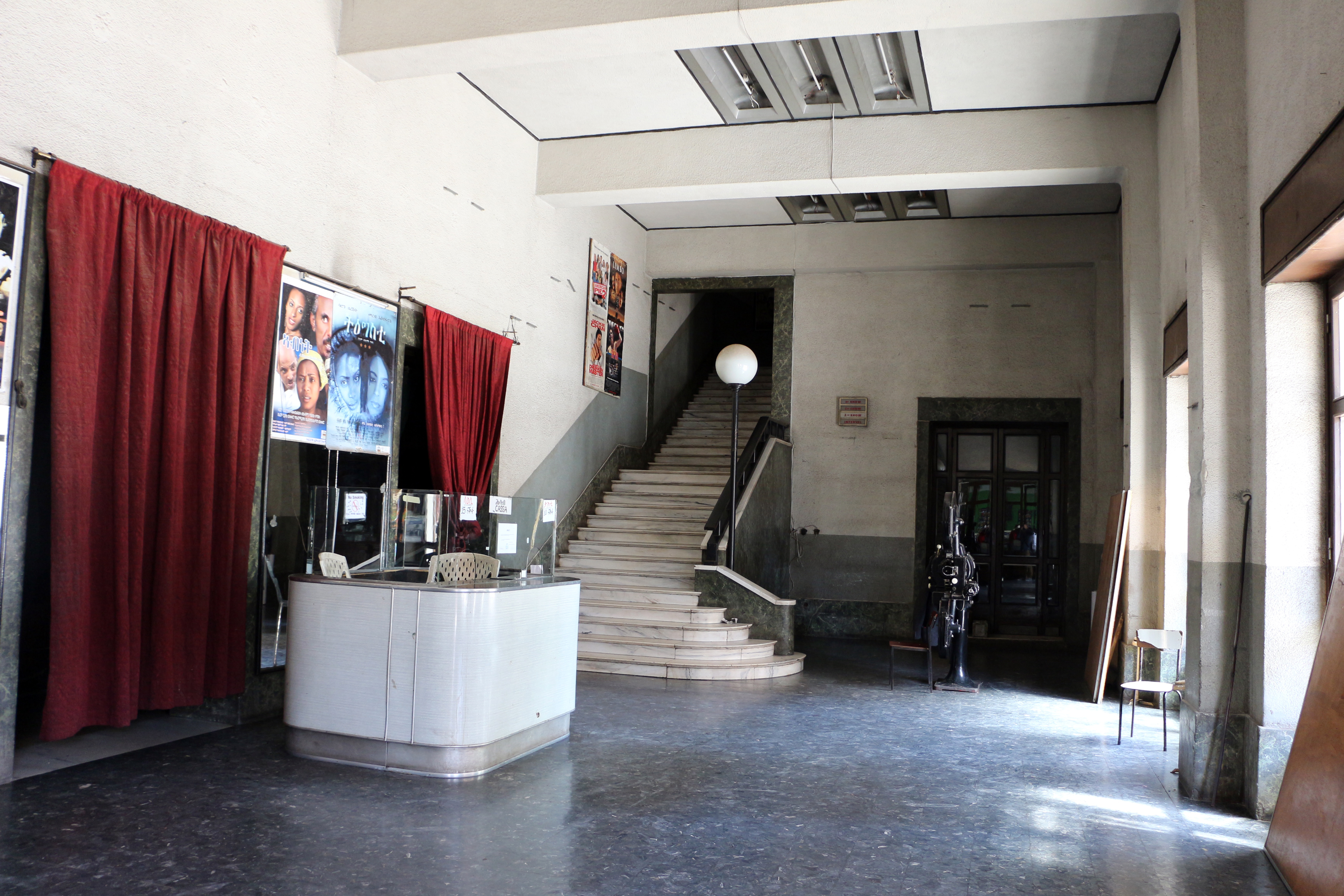
Interior

== Structure ==
The building structure has not been substantially altered since its construction, as designed by architect Mario Messina. Most of the equipment and the seats are all original. Forty-five round lights decorate the front with 'Cinema Impero' in illuminated letters, mounted vertically on the façade.

Several pairs of doors lead into the cinema. Each door has a large semi-circular handle forming a full circle with its partner when both are closed.

== See also ==
- Italian Eritreans
- Fiat Tagliero Building
- Asmara President's Office
- Governor's Palace, Asmara
