= Italian Eritrea =

1882–1936 Former Italian protectorate in modern Eritrea

Colony of Eritrea Eritrea (Italian)
- 1882–1936
- Flag Coat of arms
- Motto: Per l'onore d'Italia "For the honour of Italy"
- Anthem: Marcia Reale d'Ordinanza "Royal March of Ordinance" Marcia Reale
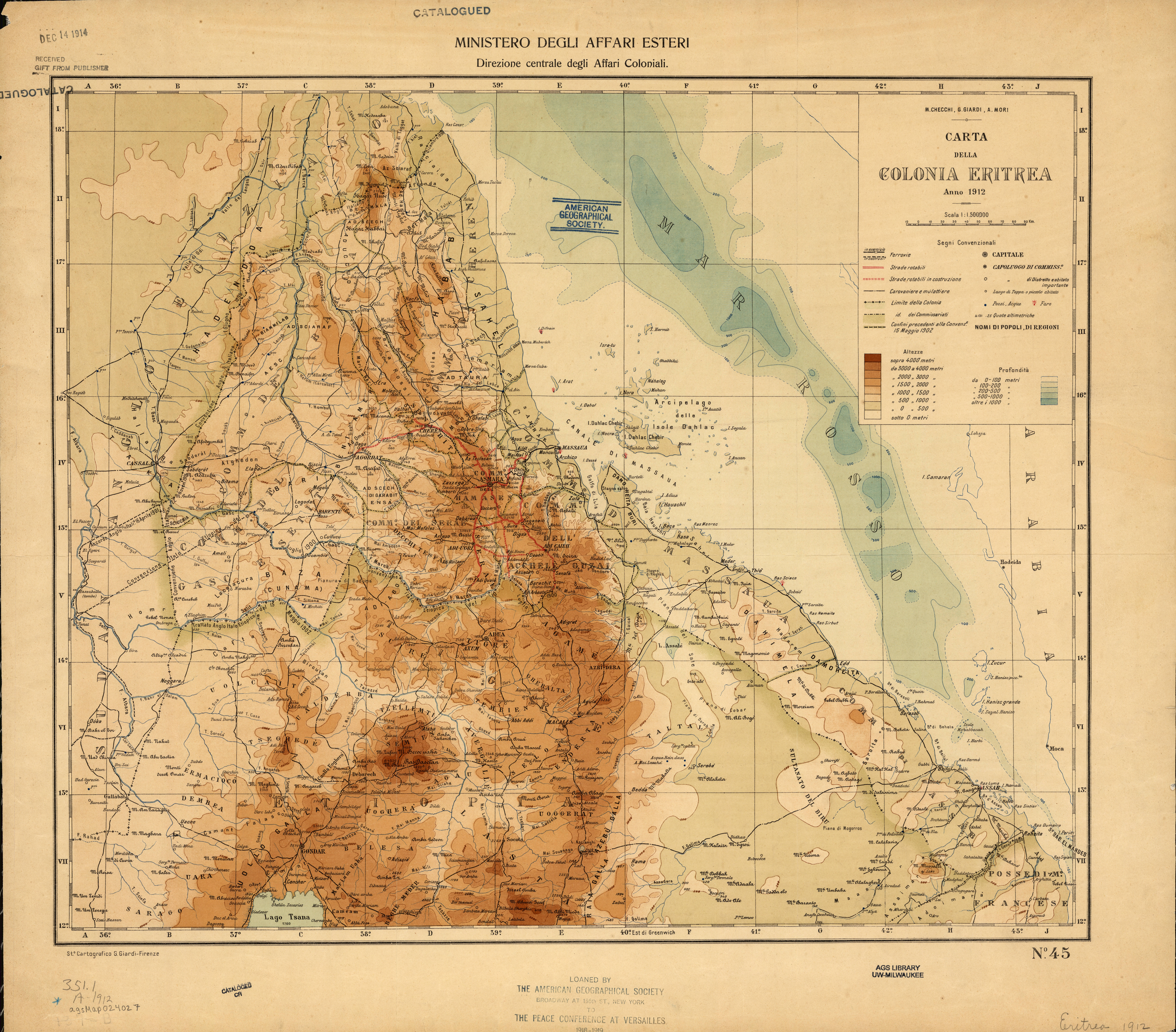
- Eritrea in 1912
- Status: Colony of Italy
- Capital: Asmara
- Common languages: Italian (official); Italian Eritrean, Tigrinya, Tigre, Kunama, Nara, Saho, Bilen, Hejazi
- Religion: Catholicism; Oriental Orthodoxy; Islam
- King
  - 1882–1900: Umberto I
  - 1900–1936: Victor Emmanuel III
- Governor
  - 1890 (first): Baldassarre Orero
  - 1935–1936 (last): Pietro Badoglio
- Historical era: New Imperialism
  - Purchase of Assab: 15 November 1869
  - Government control: 5 July 1882
  - Expansion into Eritrea: 5 February 1885
  - Treaty of Wuchale: 2 May 1889
  - Colony of Eritrea: 1 January 1890
  - Part of Italian East Africa: 1 June 1936
  - British occupation: 19 May 1941
  - Relinquished by Italy: 10 February 1947
  - End of British occupation: 15 September 1952
- Currency: Eritrean tallero (1890–1921); Italian lira (1921–1936)
Preceded by	Succeeded by
Ethiopian Empire; Khedivate of Egypt	Italian East Africa
- Today part of: Eritrea

Italian Eritrea (Italian: Colonia Eritrea, "Colony of Eritrea") was a colony of the Kingdom of Italy in the territory of present-day Eritrea. The first Italian establishment in the area was the purchase of Assab by the Rubattino Shipping Company in 1869, which came under government control in 1882. Occupation of Massawa in 1885 and the subsequent expansion of territory would gradually engulf the region and in 1889 the Ethiopian Empire recognized the Italian possession in the Treaty of Wuchale. In 1890 the Colony of Eritrea was officially founded.

In 1936 the region was integrated into Italian East Africa as the Eritrea Governorate. This would last until Italy's loss of the region in 1941, during the East African campaign of World War II. Italian Eritrea then came under British military administration, which in 1951 fell under United Nations supervision. In September 1952 it became an autonomous part of Ethiopia, until its independence in 1991.

== History ==
=== Background ===
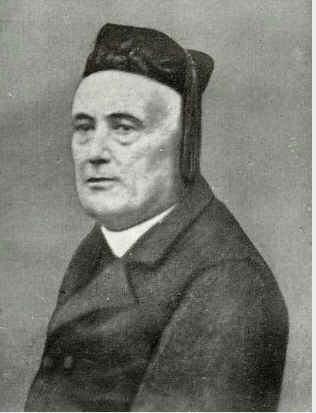
Giuseppe Sapeto, c. 1870

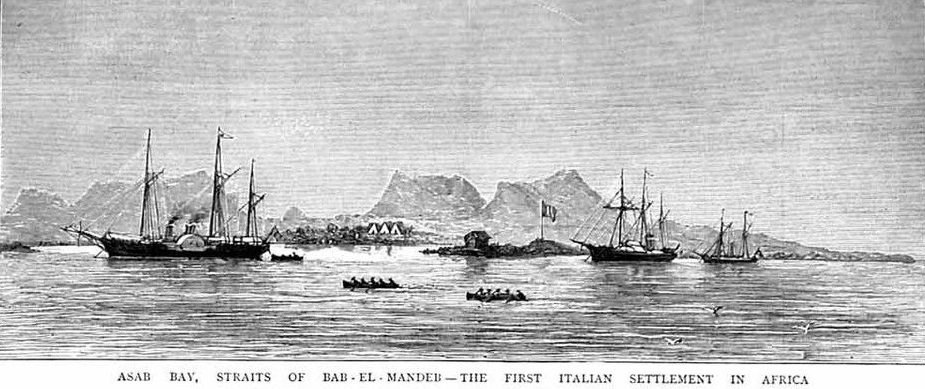
Italian settlement at Assab, 1880

The leading figure of the early history of Italian enterprises in the Red Sea was Giuseppe Sapeto. When a young monk, preparing himself in Cairo for missionary work, he had been dispatched in 1837 into Abyssinia. Afterward, he became an active advocate of European penetration, initially encouraging the French to establish themselves in the area. After 1866, following the political unification of Italy, he sought to develop Italian influence instead. As the Suez Canal neared completion, he began to visualize the establishment of a coaling station and port of call for Italian steamships in the Red Sea. Sapeto won over the Italian minister for foreign affairs, and King Victor Emmanuel II, to whom he explained his ideas.

In the autumn of 1869 he, together with Admiral Acton, was sent by the government to the Red Sea to choose a suitable port and arrange for its sale. This he did by paying a small deposit to the Danakil chiefs at Assab Bay in return for their promise to sell their territory to him on his return. Meanwhile, the government had been in touch with Raffaele Rubattino, whose company was planning to establish a steamship line through the newly opened Suez Canal and the Red Sea to India. It was agreed that the company would buy the territory in its own name and with its own funds, but should undertake to use it in the national interest. Sapeto returned to the Red Sea on behalf of the company, completed the purchase and bought more land to the south.

By March 1870, an Italian shipping company had thus become claimant to territory at the northern end of Assab Bay, a deserted but spacious bay about half-way between Annesley Bay to the north and Obock to the South. However, the area, — which had been long dominated by the Ottoman Empire and Egypt— was not settled by the Italians until 1880. Two years later, Italy formally took possession of the nascent colony from its commercial owners.

Most of the western coast of the Red Sea was then formally claimed by the Khedivate of Egypt (under the notional rule of the Ottoman Empire, who held the eastern coast) but the region was thrown into chaos by major Egyptian defeats in the Egyptian–Ethiopian War and by the success of the Mahdi's uprising in the Sudan. In 1884, the British Hewett Treaty promised the Bogos—the highlands of modern Eritrea—and free access to the Massawan coast to Emperor Yohannes IV in exchange for his help evacuating garrisons from the Sudan;

=== Formation of the colony ===
In the vacuum left by the Egyptian withdrawal, though, British diplomats were concerned about the rapid expansion of French Somaliland, France's colony along the Gulf of Tadjoura. Ignoring their treaty with Ethiopia, they openly encouraged Italy to expand north into Massawa, which was taken without a shot by a 1,000 men expedition led by Colonel Tancredi Saletta on 5 February 1882. Located on a coral island surrounded by lucrative pearl-fishing grounds, the superior port was fortified and made the capital of the Italian governor. Assab, meanwhile, continued to find service as a coaling station. As they were not a party to the Hewett Treaty, the Italians began restricting access to arms shipments and imposing customs duties on Ethiopian goods immediately.

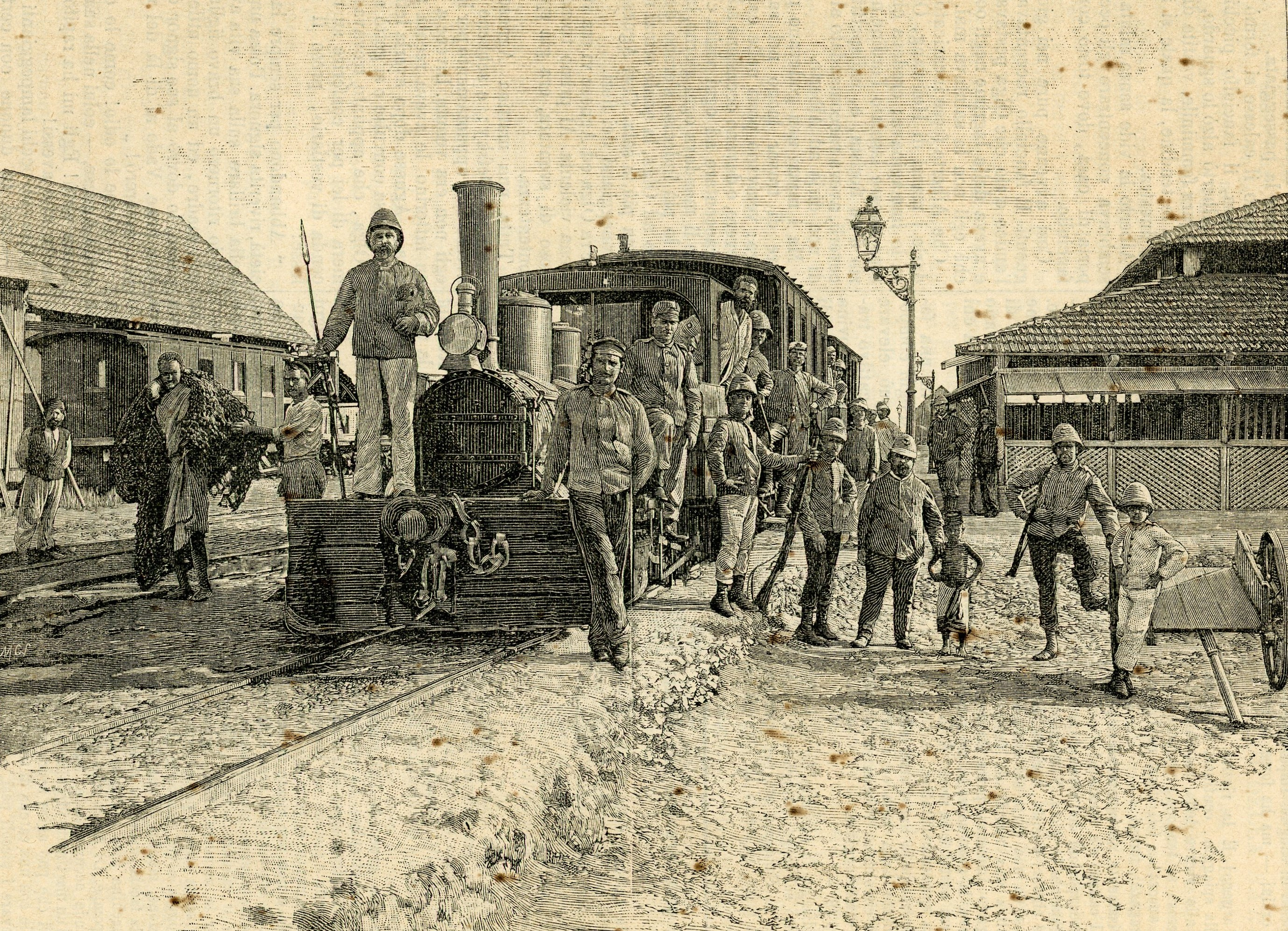
Massawa railway station, from L’illustrazione popolare, 1890

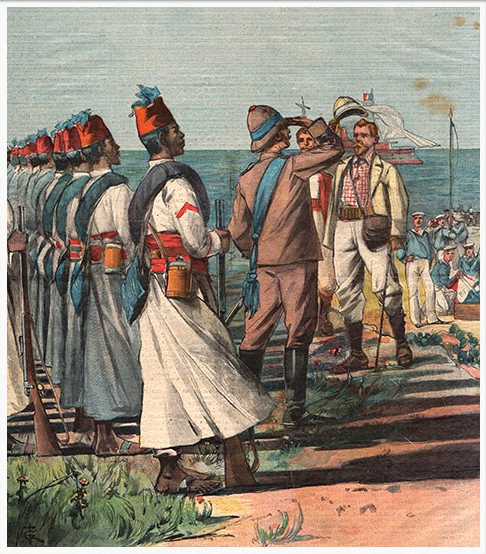
Eritrean Ascaris, colonial troops of the Italian Army, in a 1898 wood engraving

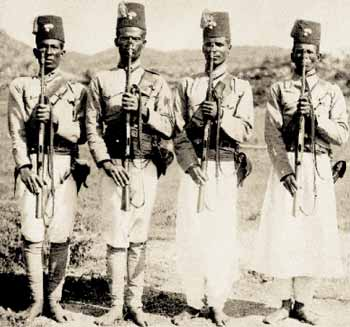
Eritrean Zaptié, native gendarmerie units of the Italian colonies, 1920s

In the disorder that followed the 1889 death of Yohannes IV, Gen. Oreste Baratieri occupied the highlands along the Eritrean coast including the town of Asmara. The next year, Eritrea was officially declared an Italian colony in the royal decree of 1 January 1890, n. 6592, with its capital in Massawa. Its first governor was General Baldassarre Orero, replaced a few months later by General Antonio Gandolfi, a trusted friend of Francesco Crispi. The colony was named Eritrea (which came from the ancient Greek name of the Red Sea) by plenipotentiary minister Carlo Dossi, replacing the previous intended name of "New Ethiopia".

In the Treaty of Wuchale (It. Uccialli) signed the same year, King Menelik of Shewa—a southern Ethiopian kingdom—recognized the Italian occupation of his rivals' lands of Bogos, Hamasien, Akele Guzay, and Serae in exchange for guarantees of financial assistance and continuing access to European arms and ammunition. His subsequent victory over his rival kings and enthronement as Emperor Menelik II (r. 1889–1913) made the treaty formally binding upon the entire country.

Once established, however, Menelik took a dim view towards Italian involvement with local leaders in his northern province of Tigray; while the Italians, for their part, felt bound to involvement given the regular Tigrayan raiding of tribes within their colony's protectorate and the Tigrayan leaders themselves continued to claim the provinces now held by Italy. Negotiations with the French over a railway brought things to a head: the Italian—but not Amharic—version of the Treaty of Wuchale had prohibited Ethiopia with foreign negotiations except through Italy, effectively making the realm an Italian protectorate. Secure both domestically and militarily, Menelik denounced the treaty in whole and the ensuing war, culminating in Italy's disastrous defeat at Adwa, ended their hopes of annexing Ethiopia for a time.

=== Italian colonial development ===
The first non-military governor of Eritrea was Ferdinando Martini (1897-1907), a staunch supporter of the Italian state's need for colonies. He was tasked with re-establishing peaceful relations with Ethiopia, improving relations between Italians and the indigenous populations, and creating a body of officials to administer the colony. In 1897, Martini declared Asmara the capital of the colony. A few modern buildings such as the Commissariato, a small jail, the troop commanders' villa, a club for Italian officers, and several houses and roads were built before 1900. However, Martini also imposed strict racial segregation and denied natives access to education. Education to the natives was provided by the Swedish Evangelical Mission and the Order of Friars Minor Capuchin.

The Italian authorities initially failed to properly exploit the territory due to the lack of resources and as a result, the prime minister, Antonio Starabba, Marchese di Rudinì attempted to sell Eritrea to Belgium on the grounds that Eritrea was too expensive to hold onto, but was overruled by king Umberto I who insisted that Eritrea must stay Italian. However, the project of making the colony a transit hub for trade turned out to be more successful. During the late twentieth century Assab would become Ethiopia's main port, but it was long overshadowed by nearby Djibouti, whose railway (completed to Dire Dawa in 1902) permitted it to quickly supplant traditional caravan-based routes to Assab and Zeila. Massawa remained the primary port for most of northern Ethiopia, but its relatively high customs dues, dependence on caravans, and political antagonism limited the volume on its trade with Ethiopia.

Seeking to develop their own lands, the Italian government launched the first development projects in the new colony in the late 1880s. The Eritrean Railway was completed to Saati in 1888 and reached Asmara in the highlands in 1911. The Asmara–Massawa Cableway was the longest line in the world during its time. Italian administration of Eritrea also brought improvements in the medical and agricultural sectors of Eritrean society. Despite an imposition of racial laws, all urban Eritreans had access to modern sanitation and hospital services.

Nicknamed Colonia Primogenita ("First-born Colony") in contrast to the newer and less-developed territories of Italian Somaliland and Libya, Eritrea boasted a larger native Italian settlement than the other lands. The first few dozen families were sponsored by the Italian government around the start of the 20th century and settled around Asmara and Massawa.

The Italian-Eritrean community then grew from around 4,000 during World War I to nearly 100,000 at the beginning of World War II. While tolerating Islamic adherence, the Italians endorsed a huge expansion of Catholicism in Eritrea and constructed many churches in the highlands around Asmara and Keren, centered on the Church of Our Lady of the Rosary in the capital.

By the early 1940s, Catholicism was the declared religion of around 28% of the colony's population, while Christianity was the religion of more than half the Eritreans.

=== Fascist era ===
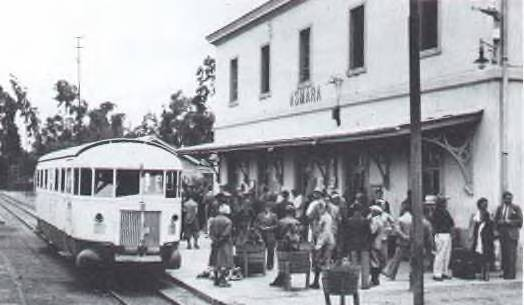
The railway station of Asmara in 1938, with passengers boarding a Littorina

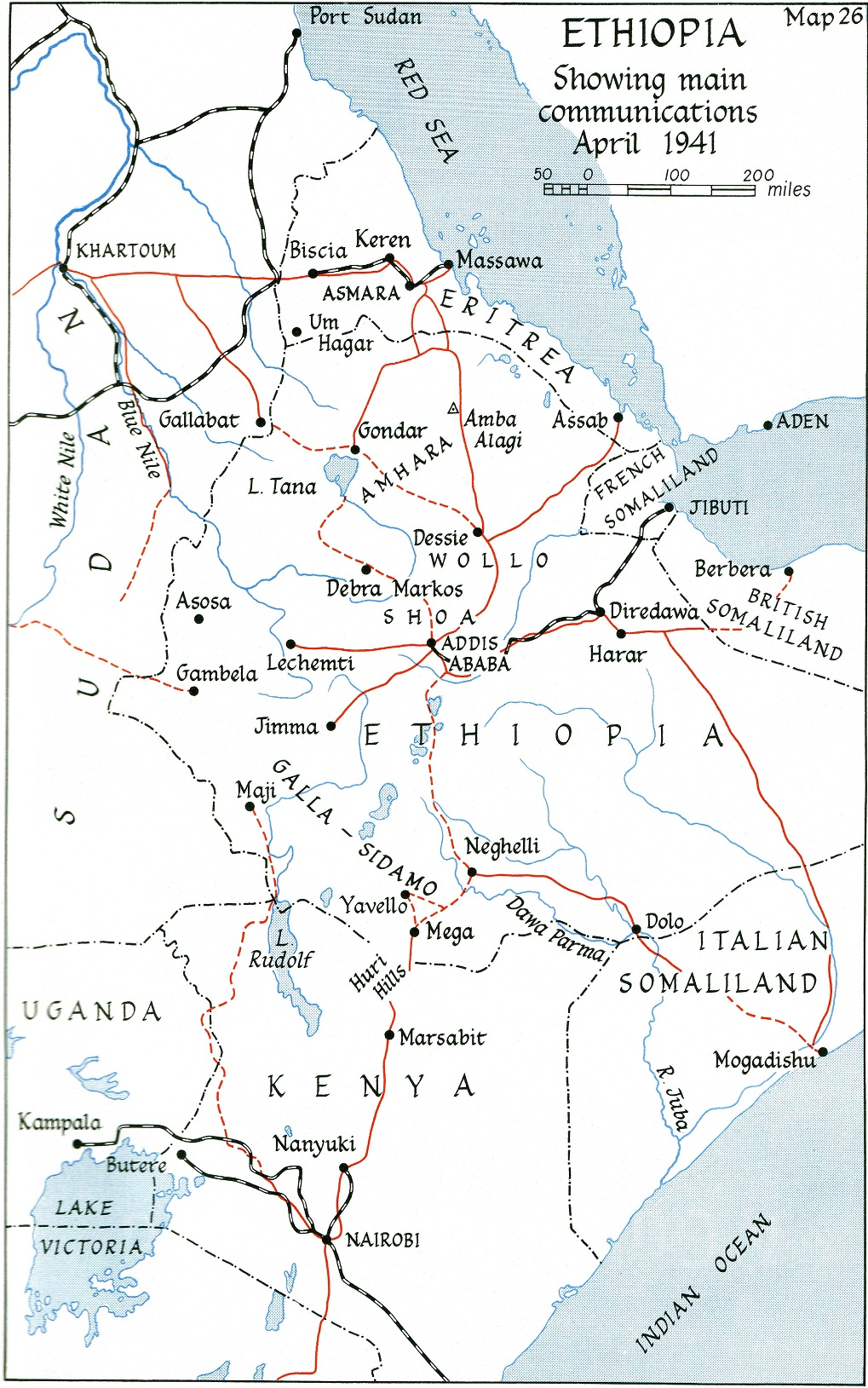
Map showing in red the new roads (like the "Imperial road", and those in construction in 1941) created by the Italians in Eritrea and AOI

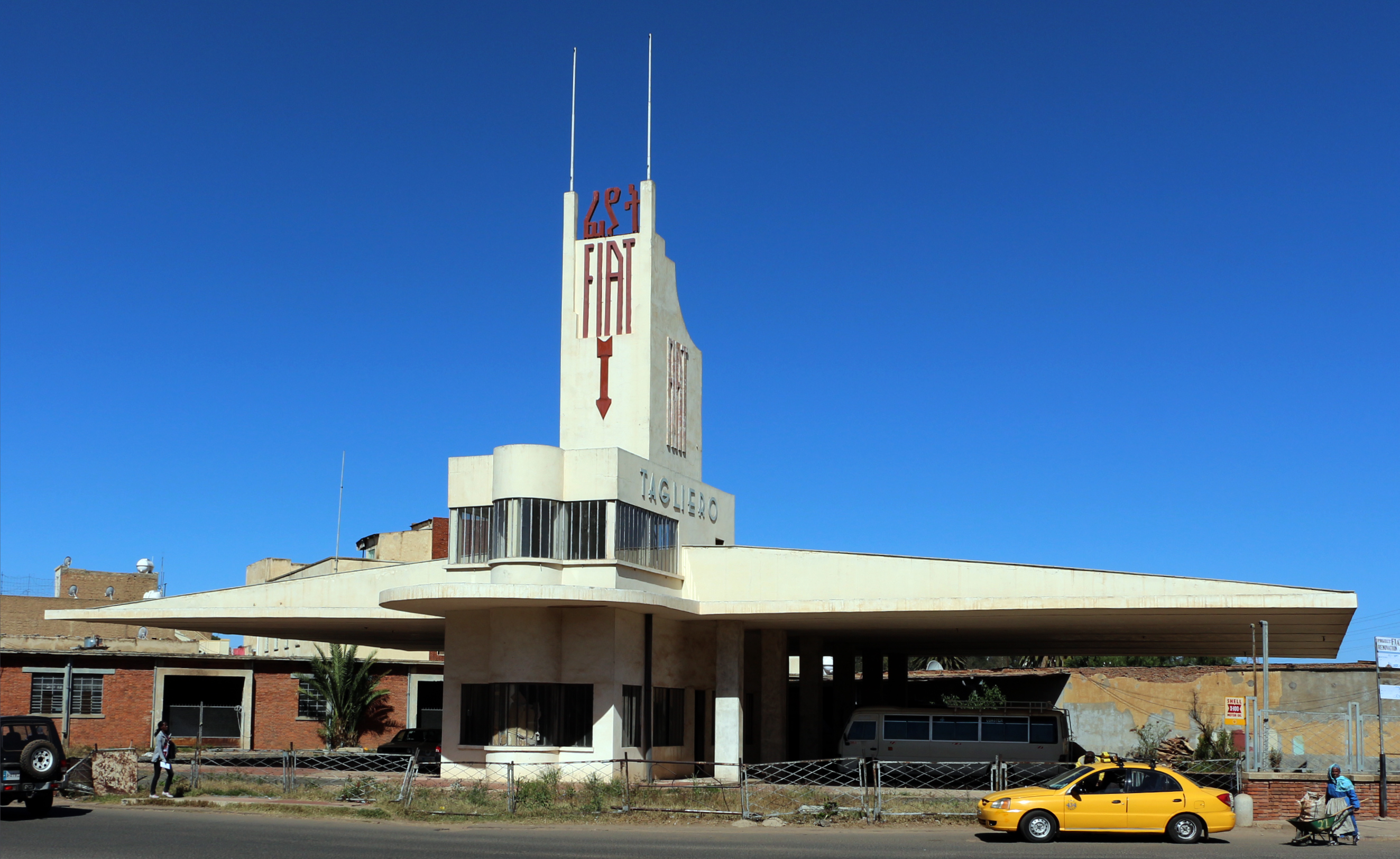
Fiat Tagliero Building, Gas Station in Art deco style of Italian Asmara

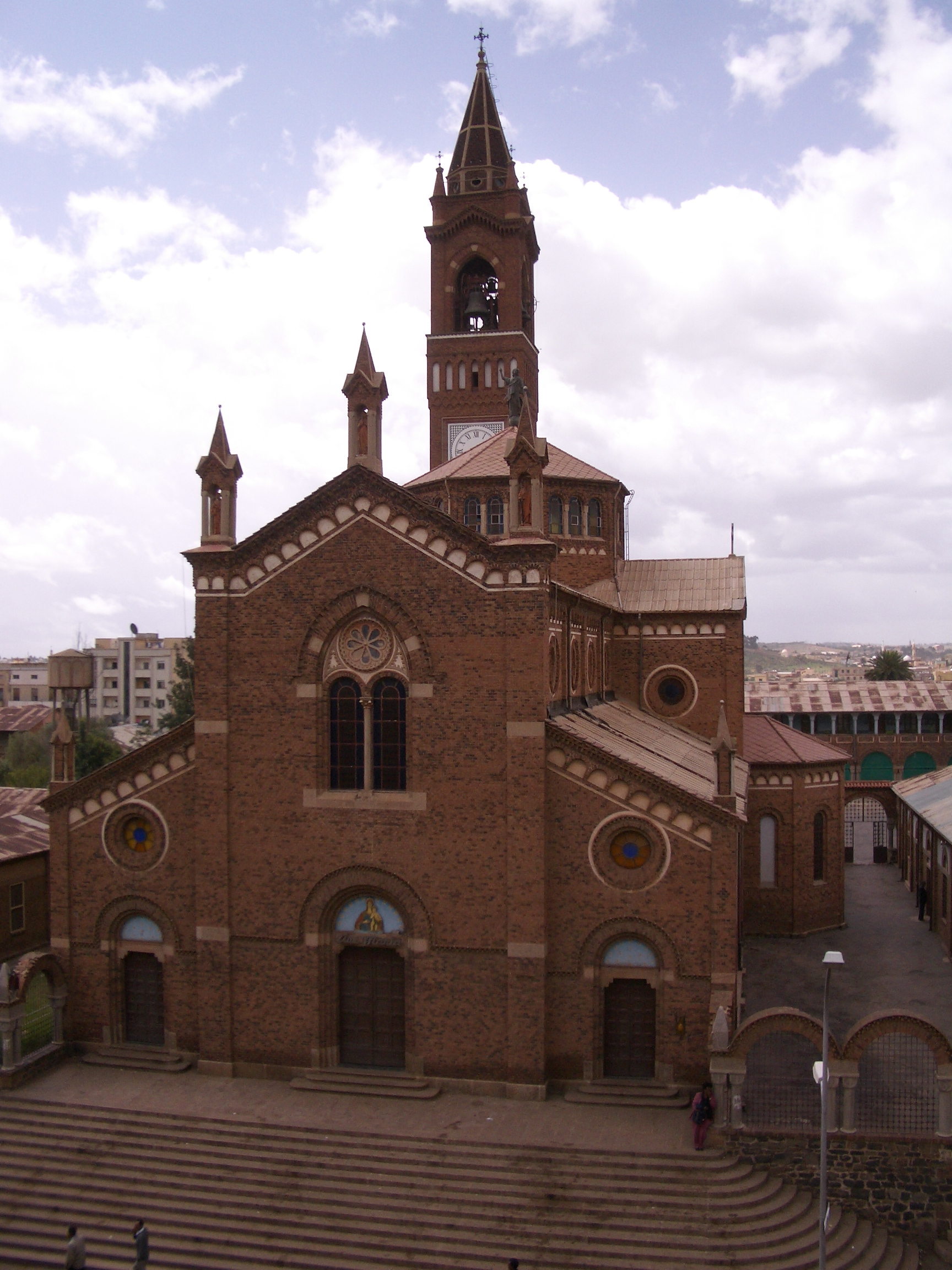
Church of Our Lady of the Rosary in Asmara, built in 1923

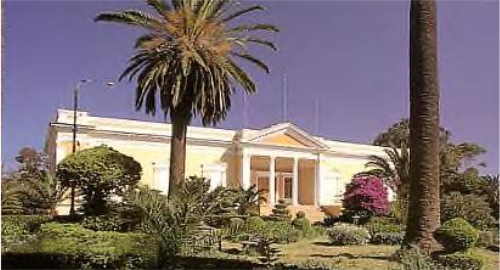
Governor's Palace, built in 1940 (current Presidential Palace)

Benito Mussolini's rise to power in Italy in 1922 brought profound changes to the colonial government in Eritrea. After il Duce declared the birth of Italian Empire in May 1936, Italian Eritrea (enlarged with northern Ethiopia's regions) and Italian Somaliland were merged with the just conquered Ethiopia in the new Italian East Africa (Africa Orientale Italiana) administrative territory. This Fascist period was characterized by imperial expansion in the name of a "new Roman Empire".

Eritrea was chosen by the Italian government to be the industrial center of Italian East Africa:

After the establishment of new transportation and communication methods in the country, the Italians also started to set up new factories, which in turn made due contribution in enhancing trade activities. The newly opened factories produced buttons, cooking oil, and pasta, construction materials, packing meat, tobacco, hide and other household commodities. In the year 1939, there were around 2,198 factories and most of the employees were Eritrean citizens, some even moved from the villages to work in the factories. The establishment of industries also made an increase in the number of both Italians and Eritreans residing in the cities. The number of Italians residing in the country increased from 4,600 to 75,000 in five years; and with the involvement of Eritreans in the industries, trade and fruit plantation was expanded across the nation, while some of the plantations were owned by Eritreans.

The capital of Eritrea experienced a huge increase in population: in 1935 there were only 4,000 Italians and 12,000 Eritreans; in 1938 there were 48,000 Italians and 36,000 Eritreans. Historian Gian Luca Podesta wrote that practically Asmara has become an Italian city ("in pratica Asmara era diventata una citta' italiana").

The Italian government continued to implement agricultural reforms but primarily on farms owned by Italian colonists (exports of coffee boomed in the 1930s). In 1940, in the area of Asmara, there were more than 2,000 small and medium-sized industrial companies, which were concentrated in the areas of construction, mechanics, textiles, food processing and electricity. Consequently, the standard of living in Eritrea in 1939 was considered among the best on the continent for both the local Eritreans and the Italian settlers.

Mussolini's government considered the colony as a strategic base for future aggrandizement and ruled accordingly, using Eritrea as a base to launch its 1935–1936 campaign to conquer and colonize Ethiopia. Even in World War II the Italians used Eritrea to attack Sudan and occupy the Kassala area. Indeed, the best Italian colonial troops were the Eritrean Ascari, as stated by Italian Marshall Rodolfo Graziani and legendary officer Amedeo Guillet. Furthermore, after World War I, service with the Ascari become the main source of paid employment for the indigenous male population of Italian Eritrea. During the expansion required by the Italian invasion of Ethiopia in 1936, 40% of eligible Eritreans were enrolled in these colonial troops.

According to the Italian census of 1939 the city of Asmara had a population of 98,000, of which 53,000 (54.0%) were Italians. This fact made Asmara the main "Italian town" of the Italian Empire in Africa. Furthermore, because of the Italian architecture of the city, Asmara was called Piccola Roma (Little Rome). The total number of Italians in all of Eritrea was 75,000 in that year.

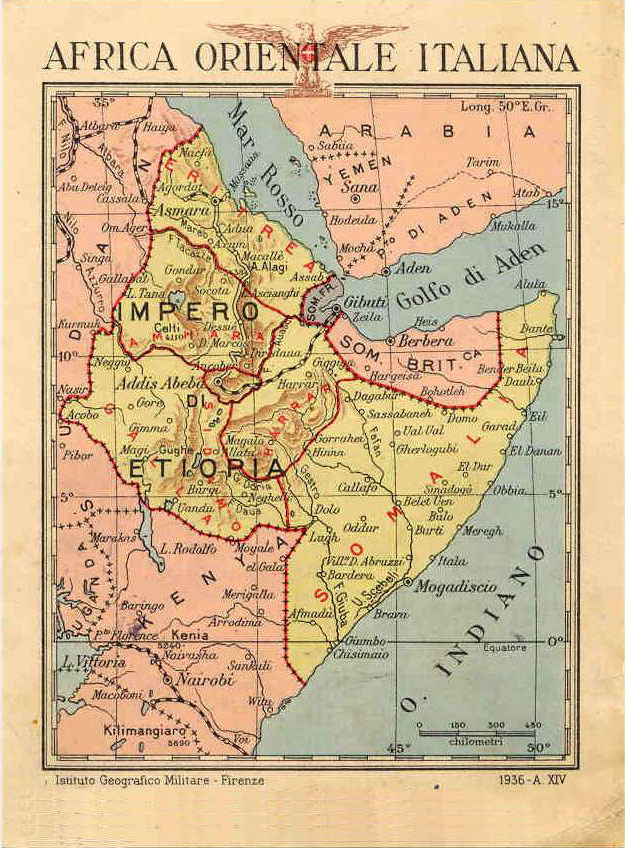
Eritrea was enlarged in 1936-1941 with Tigray territory from Ethiopia

Asmara was known to be an exceptionally modern city, not only because of its architecture, but Asmara also had more traffic lights than Rome did when the city was being built. The city incorporates many features of a planned city. Indeed, Asmara was an early example of an ideal modern city created by architects, an idea which was introduced into many cities across the world, such as Brasília, but which was not altogether popular. Features include designated city zoning and planning, wide treed boulevards, political areas and districts and space and scope for development. Asmara was not built for the Eritreans however; the Italians built it primarily for themselves and made the city a typical Italian city with even its own car race (called the Asmara circuit).

The city has been regarded as "New Rome" due to its quintessential Italian touch, not only for the architecture but also for the wide streets, piazzas and coffee bars. While the boulevards are lined with palms and indigenous shiba'kha trees, there are numerable pizzerias and coffee bars, serving cappuccinos and lattes, as well as ice cream parlours.

Many industrial investments were endorsed by the Italians in the area of Asmara and Massawa, but the beginning of World War II stopped the blossoming industrialization of Eritrea.

=== The end of the colony ===
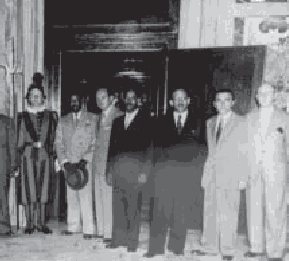
Vincenzo di Meglio (second from right) at the 1949 Conference for Eritrean independence in the Vatican

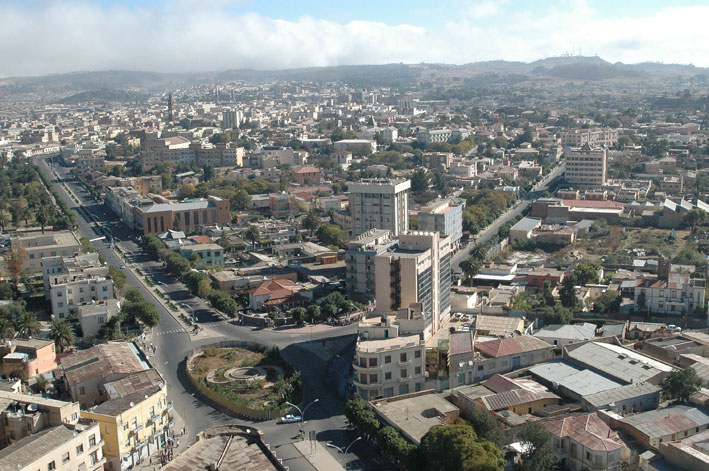
Modern downtown Asmara, called Piccola Roma, featuring Italian-style buildings

When the Allies Eritrea in January 1941, most of the infrastructure and the industrial areas were extremely damaged and the remaining ones (like the Asmara-Massawa Cableway) were successively removed and sent to India and Kenya as war reparations.

The subsequent Italian guerrilla war was supported by many Eritrean colonial troops (like the hero of Eritrean independence, Hamid Idris Awate) until the Italian armistice in September 1943. Eritrea was placed under British military administration after the Italian surrender in World War II. After the defeat of Italy, there were a lot of former Italian settlers in Eritrea who went back to Italy.

The British initially maintained the Italian administration of Eritrea, but the country soon became involved in a violent process of independence (from the British in the late 1940s and after 1952 from the Ethiopians, who annexed Eritrea in that year).

During the final years of World War II some people like Vincenzo DiMeglio defended politically the presence of Italians in Eritrea and successively promoted the independence of Eritrea. He went to Rome to participate in a conference for the independence of Eritrea, promoted by the Vatican.

After the war DiMeglio was named director of the Comitato Rappresentativo Italiani dell' Eritrea (CRIE). In 1947 he supported the creation of the Associazione Italo-Eritrei and the Associazione Veterani Ascari, in order to ally with the Eritreans favorable to Italy in Eritrea.

As a result of these creations, he cofounded the Partito Nuova Eritrea Pro Italia (Party of Shara Italy) in September 1947 as an Eritrean political party favorable to the Italian presence in Eritrea. It obtained more than 200,000 applications for membership in a single month, the majority of whom were former Italian soldiers and Eritrean Ascari. The organization was even backed by the government of Italy. The main objective of this party was Eritrean freedom, but they had a pre-condition that stated that before independence the country should be governed by Italy for at least 15 years.

With the peace treaty of 1947, the new Italian Republic officially accepted the end of the colony. As a consequence the Italian community started to disappear, especially after the Ethiopian Empire took control of Eritrea in 1952.

== Currency ==
Both the Maria Theresa thaler and the Ethiopian birr initially circulated in Italian Eritrea and Italian Somalia. Since 1890, the Eritrean tallero was minted in Rome, divided into 5 lire, which joined the previous coins without finding favor with the local population, such as the italicum thaler minted in 1918. With the annexation to the Italian East Africa, the official currency for all the colonies of the Horn of Africa became the Italian East African lira.

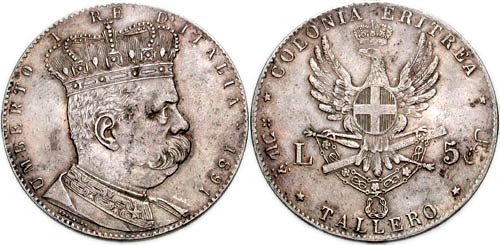
Coin used in the colony since 1890, with the effigy of King Umberto I

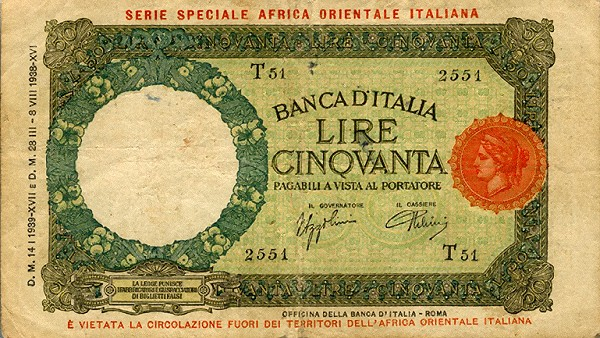
50 LIRE – Lupa romana. Italian East African lira.

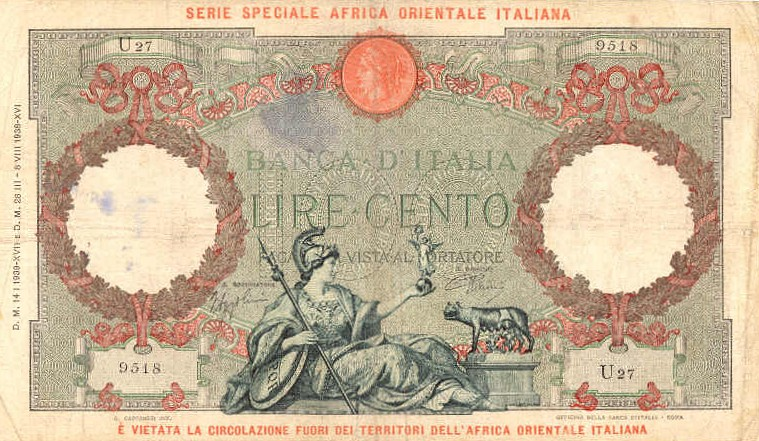
100 LIRE – LIRE CENTO – BANCA D'ITALIA – Aquila. Italian East African lira.

== See also ==
- Italian Eritreans
- Italian Colonial Empire
- Eritrea Governorate
- Italian Asmara
- Cinema Impero
- Asmara President's Office
- Fiat Tagliero Building
- Vincenzo Di Meglio
- Italian Massawa
- Eritrean Ascari
- Roman Catholicism in Eritrea
- Linea dell'Impero
- Asmara circuit
