= Italian Eritrean =

Pidgin language used during the Italian colonization of Eritrea

Italian Pidgin in Eritrea
- Pidgin italiano in Eritrea; Simplified Italian of Eritrea (Italian Eritrean)
- Native to: Italian Eritrea
- Region: Eritrea
- Ethnicity: Eritreans, Italian Eritreans
- Era: 19th to late-20th centuries
- Language family: Italian-based pidgin

Language codes
- ISO 639-3: None (mis)
- Glottolog: None
- IETF: crp-ER

Italian Pidgin in Eritrea (or Italian Eritrean, as is often called) also known as Asmara Pidgin Italian or Simplified Italian of Ethiopia (SIE) was a pidgin language used in Italian Eritrea and Eritrea Governorate when Eritrea was a colony of Italy (and until the 1970s in the Asmara region).

== History ==
This pidgin (sometimes also called "Simplified Pidgin Italian of Eritrea") started to be created at the end of the 19th century and was fully developed in the 1930s. It had similarities with the Mediterranean Lingua Franca.

Lingua Franca also seems to have affected other languages. Italian Pidgin in Eritrea, for instance, displayed some remarkable similarities with it, in particular the use of Italian participles as past or perfective markers. It seems reasonable to assume that these similarities have been transmitted through Italian "foreigner talk" stereotypes.

In 1940 nearly all the local population of Asmara (the capital of Eritrea) spoke the Eritrean Pidgin Italian when communicating with the Italian colonists.

Until the late 1970s this pidgin was still in use by some native Eritreans, but currently it is considered extinguished (even if a few old Eritreans still understand it in Asmara).

About the Italian Eritrean Habte-Mariam wrote that: “[…] at the initial stage of their contact […] It seems likely that the Italians simplified the grammar of the language they used with underlings at this stage, but they did not borrow vocabulary and grammatical forms from Amharic and Tigrinya, since it does not show up in the 'simplified Italian' used today”. Habte wrote that it was used not only between native Eritreans and Italians, but also between different tribes in Ethiopia and Eritrea.

The linguists G. Gilbert & Lionel Bender called this pidgin a "Simplified Italian of Eritrea" and wrote that:

"Simplified Italian of Eritrea" is definitely a pidgin; it is described by Habte as a “relatively variable form of Italian” (1976:179). Habte’s account of its sociolinguistic setting (1976: 170-4) and what we know of recent Eritrean history make it quite clear that it is not likely to become a creole, and in fact seems likely to die out within the next generation or two.

For them the Simplified Italian of Eritrea "has basic SVO order; unmarked form is used for nonspecific; stare and ce (from Italian) as locatives".

== Examples ==
The lexicon and syntaxes of the Italian Eritrean Pidgin was described by Saul Hoffmann in Il lascito linguistico italiano.

Examples:

- luy andato lospεdale; in Italian: È andato all’ospedale (in English: he has gone to the hospital)
- o bεrduto soldi ki tu dato bεr me; in Italian: ho perso i soldi che mi hai dato (in English: I have lost the money you gave me)
- iyo non ce/aβere makkina; in Italian: non ho la macchina (in English: I don't have the car)

== Current situation of Italian ==
Italian is still widely spoken and understood and remains a principal language in commerce and education in Eritrea; until 2020, the capital city Asmara still had an Italian-language school since the colonial decades. People born in Italy and who have children born in Italian Eritrea (who speak Italian and have formed communities in Eritrea) maintain associations of Italo-Eritreans in Italy.

The Italian language that affirms in Eritrea during the twentieth century instead presents itself as a single whole, but remaining different from the languages spoken in the rest of the peninsula; it sounds like a regional variant and yet it can not be traced back to any of the Italian regions. It possesses typically northern Italian features such as the use of the s intervocalic sound, in words like casa, rosa, cosa, but perhaps the most distinctive trait I have observed in many Italian speakers born in Eritrea, or of bilingual Italian-Tigrine Eritreans, it is the articulation of sounds that tends to be guttural in the same way as the language spoken in Eritrea, the "Tigrinya". It is as if all the sounds moved from the front to the back of the palate; the effect on the mother tongue listener is surprising given that in Italy nobody speaks in this way. This phenomenon can be ascribed to the Tigrinya linguistic substratum for cases of bilingualism; in the case instead of the Italians born and raised in Eritrea - who do not speak Tigrinya - we can perhaps trace the ancient Eritrean nurses, probably bilingual, with whom Italian children spent a lot of time and from which they probably learned to pronounce the sounds in Italian. Another characteristic element is the elision of the final vowel to the first plural person of verbs such as 'essere' and 'avere': "siam pronti, abbiam fretta". It is still used today in some linguistic areas of Northern Italy even if at the ear of the third millennium it sounds vaguely nineteenth-century, not to mention literary; it was probably imposed in the initial phase of colonization and remained unchanged through the decades.

— Giampaolo Montesanto

== Language characteristics ==
While phonology and intonation are affected by native Eritrean languages, including Tigrinya and Arabic, Eritrean Pidgin Italian is based on standard European form. The Italian lexicon in Eritrea has some loanwords of Tigrinya and Arabic origin (the latter especially includes Islamic terms). On the other hand, the Italian languages has given to the Tigrinya language many hundreds of loanwords.

The following are a few of these loanwords:

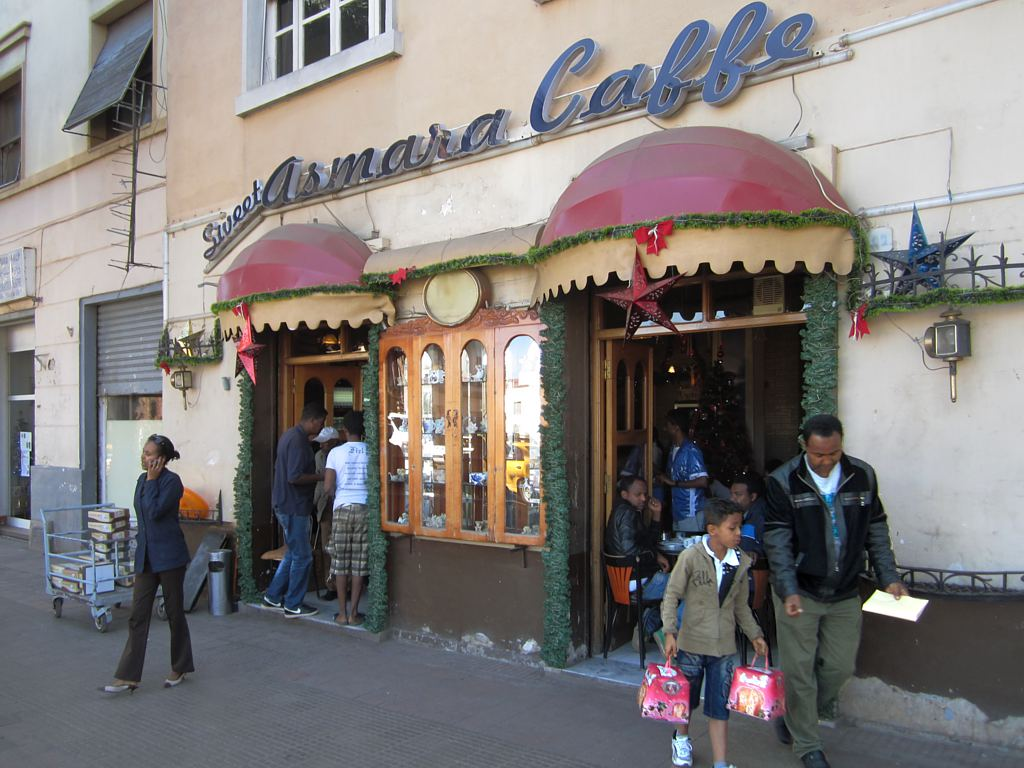
The "Asmara Caffe" on Harnet Avenue of Asmara is famous for Italian-style cappuccino and pastries. It has the italian word "caffe", that means 'coffee'

Eritrean - Italian (English)

- asheto - aceto (vinegar)
- arransci - arancia (orange)
- bishcoti - biscotti (biscuit/cookie)
- bani - pane (bread)
- cancello - cancello (gate)
- dolsce - dolce (cake)
- forchetta - forchetta (fork)
- macchina - macchina (car)
- malmalata - marmellata (marmalade/jam)
- salata - insalata (salad)
- gazeta - giornale (newspaper)
- borta - porta (door)
- calsi - calze (socks)
- benzin - benzina (petrol/gasoline)
- balaso - palazzo (building)
- barberi - barbiere (barber)
- falegnamo - falegname (carpenter)
- escala - scala (stairs)
- coborta - coperta (blanket)

== See also ==
- Simplified Italian of Somalia
- Simplified Italian of Libya
- Simplified Italian of Ethiopia
- Mediterranean Lingua Franca
- Italian language in Somalia

== Bibliography ==
- Bandini, Franco. Gli italiani in Africa, storia delle guerre coloniali 1882-1943. Longanesi. Milano, 1971.
- Bender, Lionel. Pidgin and Creole languages. University of Hawaii Press. Hawaii, 1987. ISBN 9780824882150
- Habte-Maryam Marcos. Italian Language in Ethiopia and Eritrea, edited by M. Lionel Bender et al., 170-80. Oxford University Press. London, 1976
- Montesano, Giampaolo. La lingua italiana in Eritrea. CICCRE III editor. Asmara, 2014
- Palermo, Massimo (2015). Linguistica italiana. Il Mulino. ISBN 978-8815258847.
- Parkvall, Michael. Foreword to A Glossary of Lingua Franca. Corre ed. Milwaukee, 2005
