= Italian Somaliland rupia =

Currency of Italian Somaliland from 1909 to 1925

Four bese
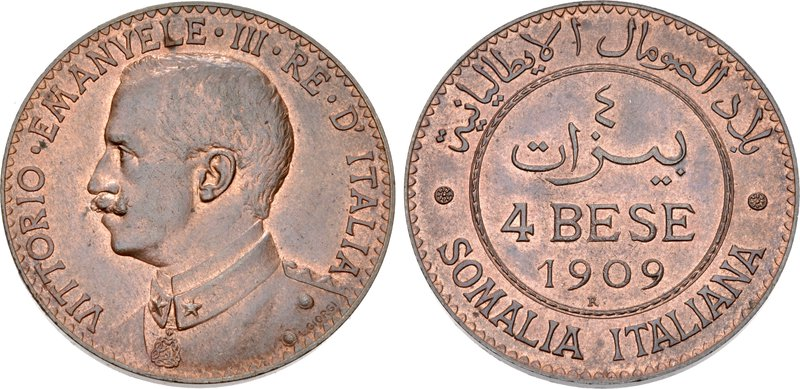
First side of the image: Vittorio Emanuele III; below L. GIORGI
Second side of the image: Denomination and date in four lines.
Æ; Rome mint, 1909

The Somali rupia (plural: rupie) was the currency in Italian Somaliland from 1909 to 1925. It was subdivided into 100 bese.

== History ==
The Somali rupia was introduced between 1909 and 1910. First, bronze coins denominated in besa were introduced, followed by silver coins denominated in rupia in 1910. The rupia replaced several currencies, including the Maria Theresa thaler and the Indian rupee, to which it was equal. The rupia was replaced by the Italian Somaliland lira during a transition period between 1 July 1925, and 30 June 1926, at a rate of 8 lire = 1 rupia.

Since the rupia's replacement, several currencies have circulated in what was Italian Somaliland, including the Italian East African lira, the East African shilling, the Italian Somaliland somalo and the Somali shilling.

== Coins ==
In 1909, bronze coins were introduced in denominations of 1 besa, 2 and 4 bese. These were followed, in 1910, by silver 1/4, 1/2 and 1 rupia. The silver coins were struck to the same specifications as those of the Indian rupee. Silver coins were struck until 1921, with bronze continuing until 1924.

== Banknotes ==
The first currency specific to Italian Somaliland was issued between 1893 and 1896 by V. Filonardi & Company, a private trading company run by Vincenzo Filonardi, Italy's former consul at Zanzibar. Filonardi's 5-rupia notes were promissory notes not intended to replace the currencies then circulating in Italian Somaliland, including the Indian rupee and the Maria Theresa thaler. Official banknotes were introduced in 1920 by the Banca d'Italia. These were cash certificates (buoni di cassa) in denominations of 1, 5 and 10 rupie. 10 and 20 rupie were printed but not issued.

Preceded by: Indian rupee Ratio: at par	Currency of Italian Somaliland; 1909 – 1925; Concurrent with: Indian rupee and Maria Theresa thaler	Succeeded by: Italian Somaliland lira Ratio: 8 lire = 1 rupia
Preceded by: Maria Theresa Thaler; Ratio: 1 rupia = 32/75 thaler	Currency of Italian Somaliland; 1909 – 1925; Concurrent with: Indian rupee and Maria Theresa thaler	Succeeded by: Italian Somaliland lira Ratio: 8 lire = 1 rupia
