= Italian Somaliland lira =

Currency of Italian Somaliland

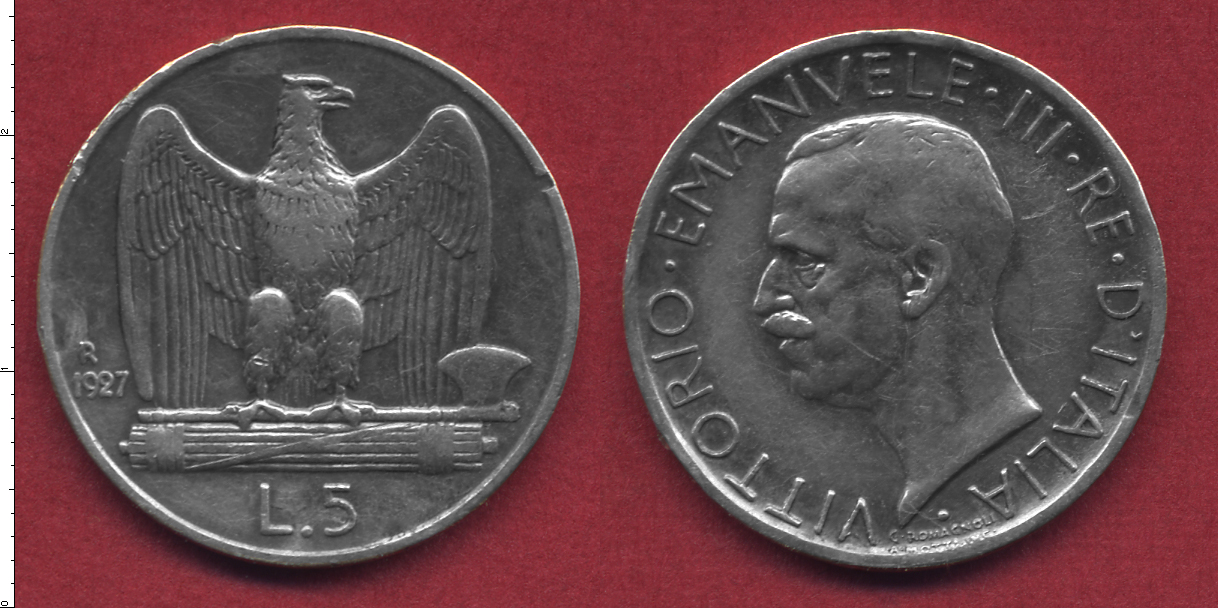
The "Italian Somaliland Lira" was a special version of the Italian "5 Lire coin" of 1927 (shown above), with the same image of King Vittorio Emanuele III

The Italian Somaliland lira also called the Somali lira (Italian: lira somala), was a special version of the Italian lira minted in Italian Somaliland between 1925 and 1926.

== Data ==
The Italian government decided to introduce the Italian lira into the colony. Decree No.1143 of 18 June 1925 authorized the introduction of the lira as legal tender, replacing the Italian rupee. (However, the Indian rupee continued to circulate as non-legal tender.) In order to introduce the lira, a period of exchange commenced on 1 July 1925 and ended on 30 June 1926. During this period, the Bank of Italy at Mogadishu exchanged the rupees for lire at a rate of eight lire per rupee. The lira proved to be an acceptable and reliable currency for the colony, but there developed an opinion in Italy, that it might be wiser to have a separate currency for its colonies (including Eritrea & Somalia), which would be linked to the lira, rather than allowing the Italian lira to circulate in its colonies. Peter Symes

The "Italian Somali Lira" replaced the Italian Somaliland rupia at a rate of 8 lire = 1 rupia. Only coins of £5 and £10 were issued, which circulated alongside Italian coins and banknotes. From 1938, banknotes for the Italian East African lira also circulated. The coin circulation officially lasted until 1941.

== Coins ==
In 1925, silver coins in denominations of 5 and 10 lire were issued.

They were slightly larger than the 5 and 10 lire coins introduced in Italy the following year. The issue was approved by the Royal Decree of 18 June 1925, n. 1143, contextually put out over the former "Somalia Rupia". To the reverse there was the Arms of Somalia era: lion passant and three six-pointed stars. The Coat of Arms, between two branches, was crowned. Legends were only in Italian.

Coins
Value	Straight	Reverse	first minting	off the course
5 lire	Vittorio Emanuele III di Savoia with king crown. Under him the word MOTTI, the image creator Attilio Motti.	Coat of Arms of "Somalia italiana": lion with 3 stars crown. Around the words SOMALIA ITALIANA.	1925	1926
10 lire	Vittorio Emanuele III di Savoia with king crown. Under him the word MOTTI, the image creator Attilio Motti.	Coat of Arms of "Somalia italiana": lion with 3 stars crown. Around the words SOMALIA ITALIANA.	1925	1926

== Bibliography ==
- Krause, Chester L.; Clifford Mishler (1991). Standard Catalog of World Coins: 1801–1991 (18th ed.). Krause Publications. ISBN 0873411501.
- Mauri, Arnaldo (1967). Il mercato del credito in Etiopia, Giuffrè ed. Milano, 1967.

Preceded by: Italian Somaliland rupia Ratio: 8 lire = 1 rupia	Currency of Italian Somaliland together with ordinary Italian lira 1925 – 1926; Concurrent with: Italian lira	Succeeded by: Italian lira Ratio: at par
