= Eritrean tallero =

Currency of Eritrea from 1890 to 1921

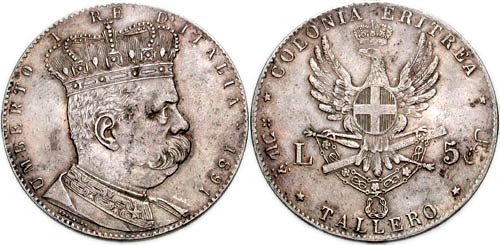
Coins of One Tallero from 1891

The tallero was the currency of Eritrea between 1890 and 1921. It was worth five lire and was subdivided into ten decimi (sing. decimo).

== Description ==
Five lire coins, engraved by Filippo Speranza, feature King Umberto I of Italy with the lettering UMBERTO I RE D'ITALIA · 1896 on the obverse, and an eagle with a shield on the reverse. They weigh 28.1250 g with an actual silver weight of 0.7234 oz of .800 fineness, and have a 40 mm diameter with a thickness of 3.1 mm.

From 1885, banknotes denominated in lire were issued by the Italian colonial authorities. In 1890, the silver tallero, patterned after the Maria Theresa thaler, was introduced (together with 50 centesimi, 1 and 2 lire coins). The last tallero were minted in 1918. In 1921, the tallero was abandoned and Italian currency circulated alone until banknotes were issued in lire in 1938.
