= Baldassarre Orero =

Kingdom of Italy politician

Alessandro Baldassarre Orero

Commander of Massawa
- In office 20 December 1889 – 1 January 1890
- Preceded by: Antonio Baldissera
- Succeeded by: Himself (as Commander of Eritrea)

Commander of Eritrea
- In office 1 January 1890 – June 1890
- Preceded by: Himself (as Commander of Massawa)
- Succeeded by: Antonio Gandolfi

Personal details
- Born: 1841; Novara, Kingdom of Sardinia
- Died: 1914; Novara, Kingdom of Italy
- Education: Military academy
- Profession: Soldier

Alessandro Baldassarre Orero (Novara, 1 June 1841 – Novara, 11 November 1914) was an Italian general who served, among other roles, as governor of Italian Eritrea.

== Biography ==
Born in Novara in 1841, Alessandro Baldassarre Orero (better known by his middle name) began his military career during the Second Italian War of Independence, distinguishing himself in the 1860 campaign during the siege of Borgo Pio and of Gaeta. In 1866, he earned the Cross of Savoy after the battle of Pozzolano.

Promoted to the rank of major general in 1887, he decided to undertake military activities in the Italian colonies in Africa, being called from November 4, 1889 to replace General Antonio Baldissera in the command of the Italian troops in Eritrea with the title of "Superior Commander of the Troops of Massawa". During his administration, which took effect from December 20 of that same 1889, the Italian colonies in the area were now mature enough to be united under the name of Eritrea and as such Orero himself found himself from January 1, 1890 in the role of Military Commander of Eritrea, remaining in office until June 30 of that same year.

He died in Novara in 1914.

== Honours ==
Knight of the Military Order of Savoy - ribbon for ordinary uniform

Knight of the Military Order of Savoy

Mauritian Medal of Merit for 50 Years of Military Career - ribbon for ordinary uniform

Mauritian Medal of Merit for 50 Years of Military Career

Commemorative Medal of the Campaigns of the Wars of Independence - ribbon for ordinary uniform

Commemorative Medal of the Campaigns of the Wars of Independence

Commemorative Medal of the Unification of Italy - ribbon for ordinary uniform

Commemorative Medal of the Unification of Italy

== Bibliography ==
- F. Bandini, The Italians in Africa: History of the Colonial Wars. (1882-1943), Longanesi, 1971
