= Antonio Gandolfi =

Italian soldier and politician

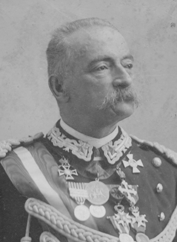
Antonio Gandolfi

Antonio Gandolfi (February 20, 1835 – March 20, 1902) was an Italian soldier and politician. He was the 2nd Italian Governor of Eritrea. He was a recipient of the Silver Medal of Military Valor.

In June 1890 Francesco Crispi, president of the Council, appointed him Governor of Eritrea.

Preceded by Baldassarre Orero	Italian Governor of Eritrea; 1890–1892	Succeeded by Oreste Baratieri
