= Simplified Italian of Somalia =

19th and 20th century Italian-based pidgin

- Pidgin italiano in Somalia; Somali-Italian
- Native to: Italian Somaliland
- Region: Somalia
- Ethnicity: Somalis, Italian Somalis
- Era: 19th to late-20th centuries
- Language family: Italian-based pidgin

Language codes
- ISO 639-3: –
- IETF: crp-SO

Simplified Italian of Somalia is an Italian-based Pidgin that developed in Italian Somaliland during the Italian Colonial Period. The Pidgin was very similar to Italian Eritrean Pidgin and used mostly in the capital region of Mogadishu as well as other Italianized towns such as Genale or Villabruzi

The Italian language began to spread throughout Somalia during the Colonial period which lasted from 1889 until 1960. Italian was enforced upon the indigenous population as a part of Italy's colonial ambition. It quickly picked up by the local inhabitants and started to become a part of daily life. There were even several newspapers and radio channels in the Italian language.

However, the Standard Italian used by the government and crown of Italy differed from the variety used by the inhabitants of Somalia due to the original linguistic differences between Italian and local languages, as well as the geographic isolation of the new pidgin from the Italian Peninsula. This pidgin was used by nearly 2/3 of the native population in 1940, according to historian Epifanio Ajello.

Many Somali-Italian words were orthographically altered to accommodate Somali phonetics. Below is an example of some Italian words translated into Italo-Somali demonstrating this phenomenon. Note the doubling of vowels, usage of consonants such as W and J not used in standard Italian and transformation of feminine ending words into masculine ending.

Examples of vocabulary of Italian words translated into Italo-Somali
Italian word	Italo-Somali equivalent
Pasta	Baasto
Giugno	Juunyo
Visita	Wiisito

== See also ==
- Italian Eritrean
- Italian Somalia
