= Mediterranean Lingua Franca =

11th–19th c. language of the Mediterranean basin

- sabir
- Region: Mediterranean basin
- Extinct: 19th century
- Language family: primarily Romance-based pidgin: Mediterranean Lingua Franca
- Dialects: Sabir; Lingua Franca

Language codes
- ISO 639-3: pml
- Glottolog: ling1242
- Linguasphere: 51-AAB-c

The Mediterranean depicted in the Catalan Atlas (1375)

The Mediterranean Lingua Franca, or Sabir, was a contact language, or languages, that were used as a lingua franca in the Mediterranean basin from the 11th to the 19th centuries. April McMahon describes Sabir as a "fifteenth century proto-pidgin" and "a relic of the original Lingua Franca, a medieval language used by Mediterranean traders and by the Crusaders." Operstein and McMahon categorize Sabir and "Lingua Franca" as separate but related languages.

== Etymology ==
Lingua franca meant literally "Frankish language" in Late Latin, and it originally referred specifically to the language that was used around the Eastern Mediterranean Sea as the main language of commerce. However, the term "Franks" was actually applied to all Western Europeans during the late Byzantine Period. Later, the meaning of lingua franca expanded to mean any bridge language. Its other name in the Mediterranean area was Sabir, a term cognate of saber ("to know") in most Iberian languages and of Italian and Latin sapere and French savoir.

== Origins ==
Based mostly on Northern Italy's languages (mainly Venetian and Genoese) and secondarily on Occitano-Romance languages (Catalan and Occitan) in the western Mediterranean area at first, Lingua Franca later came to have more Spanish and Portuguese elements, especially on the Barbary Coast (now referred to as the Maghreb). Lingua Franca also borrowed from Tamazight, Turkish, French, Greek and Arabic.

The grammar of the language used aspects from many of its lexifiers. The infinitive was used for all verb forms and the lexicon was primarily Italo-Romance, with a Spanish interface. As in Arabic, vowel space was reduced. Further, Venetian influences can be seen in the dropping of certain vowels and intervocalic stops.

== History ==
This mixed language was used widely for commerce and diplomacy and was also current among slaves of the bagnio, Barbary pirates and European renegades in precolonial Algiers. Historically, the first to use it were the Genoese and Venetian trading colonies in the eastern Mediterranean after the year 1000.

As the use of Lingua Franca spread in the Mediterranean, dialectal fragmentation emerged, the main difference being more use of Italian and Provençal vocabulary in the Middle East, while Ibero-Romance lexical material dominated in the Maghreb. After France became the dominant power in the latter area in the 19th century, Algerian Lingua Franca was heavily gallicised (to the extent that locals are reported having believed that they spoke French when conversing in Lingua Franca with the Frenchmen, who in turn thought they were speaking Arabic), and this version of the language was spoken into the nineteen hundreds.... Algerian French was indeed a dialect of French, although Lingua Franca certainly had had an influence on it.... Lingua Franca also seems to have affected other languages. Eritrean Pidgin Italian, for instance, displayed some remarkable similarities with it, in particular the use of Italian participles as past or perfective markers. It seems reasonable to assume that these similarities have been transmitted through Italian foreigner talk stereotypes.

The similarities contribute to discussions of the classification of Lingua Franca as a language. Although its official classification is that of a pidgin, some scholars adamantly oppose that classification and believe it would be better viewed as an interlanguage of Italian.

Hugo Schuchardt (1842–1927) was the first scholar to investigate the Lingua Franca systematically. According to the monogenetic theory of the origin of pidgins that he developed, Lingua Franca was known by Mediterranean sailors including the Portuguese. When the Portuguese started exploring the seas of Africa, America, Asia and Oceania, they tried to communicate with the natives by mixing a Portuguese-influenced version of Lingua Franca with the local languages. When English or French ships came to compete with the Portuguese, the crews tried to learn the "broken Portuguese". A process of relexification caused the Lingua Franca and Portuguese lexicon to be substituted by the languages of the peoples in contact.

The theory is one way of explaining the similarities between most of the European-based pidgins and creole languages, such as Tok Pisin, Papiamento, Sranan Tongo, Krio and Chinese Pidgin English. Those languages use forms similar to or derived from sabir for 'to know' and piquenho for "children".

Lingua Franca left traces in present Algerian slang and Polari. There are traces even in geographical names, such as Cape Guardafui, which literally means "Cape Look and Escape" in Lingua Franca and ancient Italian.

== Phonology ==
Consonants
		Labial	Alveolar	Post-alv./ Palatal	Velar
Nasal		m	n	ɲ	
Plosive	voiceless	p	t		k
Plosive	voiced	b	d		g
Affricate	voiceless		t͡s	t͡ʃ	
Affricate	voiced			d͡ʒ	
Fricative	voiceless	f	s	ʃ	
Fricative	voiced	v	z		
Approximant	median			j	w
Approximant	Lateral		l	ʎ	
Trill			r		

Vowels
	Front	Central	Back
Close	i		u
Mid	e		o
Open		a	

== Morphology ==
Pronouns
	Singular	Plural
1st person	mi	noi
2nd person	ti	voi
3rd person	ellou (m) ella (f)	elli

== Vocabulary ==
Because it was a pidgin, Mediterranean Lingua Franca had a very small vocabulary. This and the fact the language is not well attested means only a few hundred words in the language have been recorded to the present-day.

== Sample text ==
Sabir	English
Benda ti istran plegrin benda marqueta maidin. Benda benda stringa da da agugeta colorada dali moro namorada y Ala ti da bon matin. Por Ala te rrecomenda dar maidin marqueta benda con bestio tuto lespenda xomaro estar bon rroçin. Peregrin taybo cristian si querer andar Jordan pilla per tis jornis pan que no trobar pan ne vin	Benda, [oh] you foreign pilgrim – benda, marqueta, maidin [names of coins] One benda, one benda, I give a lace, a colored lace. Give it to your Arab girlfriend and Allah give you a good morning. By Allah I recommend you to spend a maidin, a marqueta, a benda [to hire] a beast complete with provisions: a donkey is an excellent steed. Good Christian pilgrim, if you wish to go to the Jordan, take bread for your journey for you will find neither bread nor wine

== See also ==
- African Romance
- Mozarabic language
- Lingua Franca Nova

== Bibliography ==
- Brown, Joshua. 2022. "On the Existence of a Mediterranean Lingua Franca and the Persistence of Language Myths". Language Dynamics in the Early Modern Period (edited by Karen Bennett and Angelo Cattaneo). London: Routledge, pp. 169–189. ISBN 9780367552145.
- Brown, Joshua. 2024. "Digital approaches to multilingual text analysis: the Dictionnaire de la langue franque and its morphology as hybrid data in the past". Multilingual Digital Humanities (edited by Lorella Viola and Paul Spence). Digital Research in the Arts and Humanities. London: Routledge, pp.213–229.
- Dakhlia, Jocelyne, Lingua Franca – Histoire d'une langue métisse en Méditerranée, Actes Sud, 2008, ISBN 2-7427-8077-7.
- John A. Holm, Pidgins and Creoles, Cambridge University Press, 1989, ISBN 0-521-35940-6, p. 607.
- Henry Romanos Kahane, The Lingua Franca in the Levant: Turkish Nautical Terms of Italian and Greek Origin, University of Illinois, 1958.
- Hugo Schuchardt, "The Lingua Franca". Pidgin and Creole languages: selected essays by Hugo Schuchardt (edited and translated by Glenn G. Gilbert), Cambridge University Press, 1980. ISBN 0-521-22789-5.
- Nolan, Joanna. 2020. The Elusive Case of Lingua Franca. Switzerland: Palgrave Macmillan.
- Drusteler, Eric R. 2012. "Speaking in Tongues: Language and communication in the Early Modern Mediterranean." Past and Present 217: 4–77. doi:10.1093/pastj/gts023.
- Hitchcock, Louise A., and Aren M. Maeir. 2016. "A Pirate's Life for me: The Maritime culture of the Sea Peoples." Palestine Exploration Quarterly 148(4):245–264.
- Lang, George. 1992. "The Literary Settings of Lingua Franca (1300–1830)." Neophilologus 76(1): 64–76. doi:10.1007/BF00316757.
- Operstein, Natalie. 2018. "Inflection in Lingua Franca: from Haedo's Topographia to the Dictionnaire de la langue franque." Morphology 28: 145–185. doi:10.1007/s11525-018-9320-8.
