= Italian East African lira =

Currency of Italian East Africa

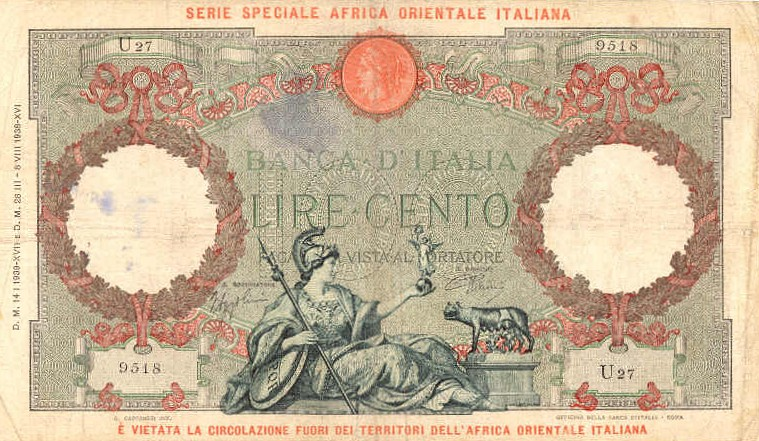
Banknote of 100 lira AOI from 1938

The Italian East African lira was a special banknote circulating in Italian East Africa (Italian: Africa Orientale Italiana, AOI) between 1938 and 1941.

== Data ==
When Fascist Italy imposed the Italian lira in occupied Ethiopian Empire in 1936, it decided upon a rate of 3 lire = 1 thaler. Ethiopians were obliged by law to change their coins and banknotes but considering that the thaler was a silver coin with a value 28 times higher than the lira, they began to hide them to retain the metal value. The Italian government declared this practice illegal, but in 1938 issued a new banknotes "lira AOI" at a better rate of 4.5 lire = 1 thaler for citizens who would willingly exchange their silver coins at the Bank of Italy.

Very few people accepted this and in 1939 they were offered a second possibility at a rate 5 lire = 1 thaler. In Italian Somaliland, the lira was already circulating. In occupied Ethiopia, the lira replaced the Ethiopian thaler (issued by the National Bank of Ethiopia) whilst in Italian Eritrea it replaced the Eritrean tallero, a silver coin minted in Italy. It also briefly replaced the East African shilling in British Somaliland under Italian occupation between 1940 and 1941, when the Italian East African lira was offered at a rate 13 lire = 1 thaler.

The Italian East African lira was seen as a possible bribery, and it was immediately replaced by the East African shilling in 1941, when the United Kingdom gained control of Italy's colonies, at the rate of 1 shilling = 24 lire. The banknotes retired by the British government were later used by the British Army when it occupied Italy between 1943 and 1945, producing with the AM-lira a high inflation in the country.

== Banknotes ==
In 1938, banknotes were issued for use in Italian East Africa in denominations of 50, 100, 500 and 1000 lire. The designs were the same as those used on Italian notes but the colours of the notes were different and they bore an overprint with the words "Serie Speciale Africa Orientale Italiana". A relic of the lira was the use even in the 1960s of the expression "Lix Lira" (=six lira) for 25 cents.

== Bibliography ==
- Mauri, Arnaldo (1967). Il mercato del credito in Etiopia, Giuffrè, Milano 1967. [in Italian]
- Tuccimei, Ercole (1999). La Banca d'Italia in Africa, Presentazione di Arnaldo Mauri, Laterza, Bari, ISBN 88-420-5686-3 [in Italian]

Preceded by: Eritrean thaler Location: Italian Eritrea; Ratio: 1:5	Currency of Italian East Africa together with the Italian lira (Italian Somaliland, Eritrea, Ethiopia); 1938 – 1941	Succeeded by: East African shilling Reason: captured by United Kingdom; Ratio: 1 shilling = 24 lira
Preceded by: Maria Theresa thaler Location: Ethiopia; Ratio: 1:5	Currency of Italian East Africa together with the Italian lira (Italian Somaliland, Eritrea, Ethiopia); 1938 – 1941	Succeeded by: East African shilling Reason: captured by United Kingdom; Ratio: 1 shilling = 24 lira
Preceded by: East African shilling Reason: captured by Italy	Currency of British Somaliland together with the Italian lira 1940 – 1941	Succeeded by: East African shilling Reason: captured by United Kingdom; Ratio: 1 shilling = 24 lira
Preceded by: Italian lira Reason: British occupation	Currency of Italy together with the Italian lira 1943 – 1945	Succeeded by: Italian lira Ratio: at par
