= Fiat Tagliero Building =

Futurist style service station in Asmara, Eritrea

Coordinates: 15°19′42″N 38°55′33″E

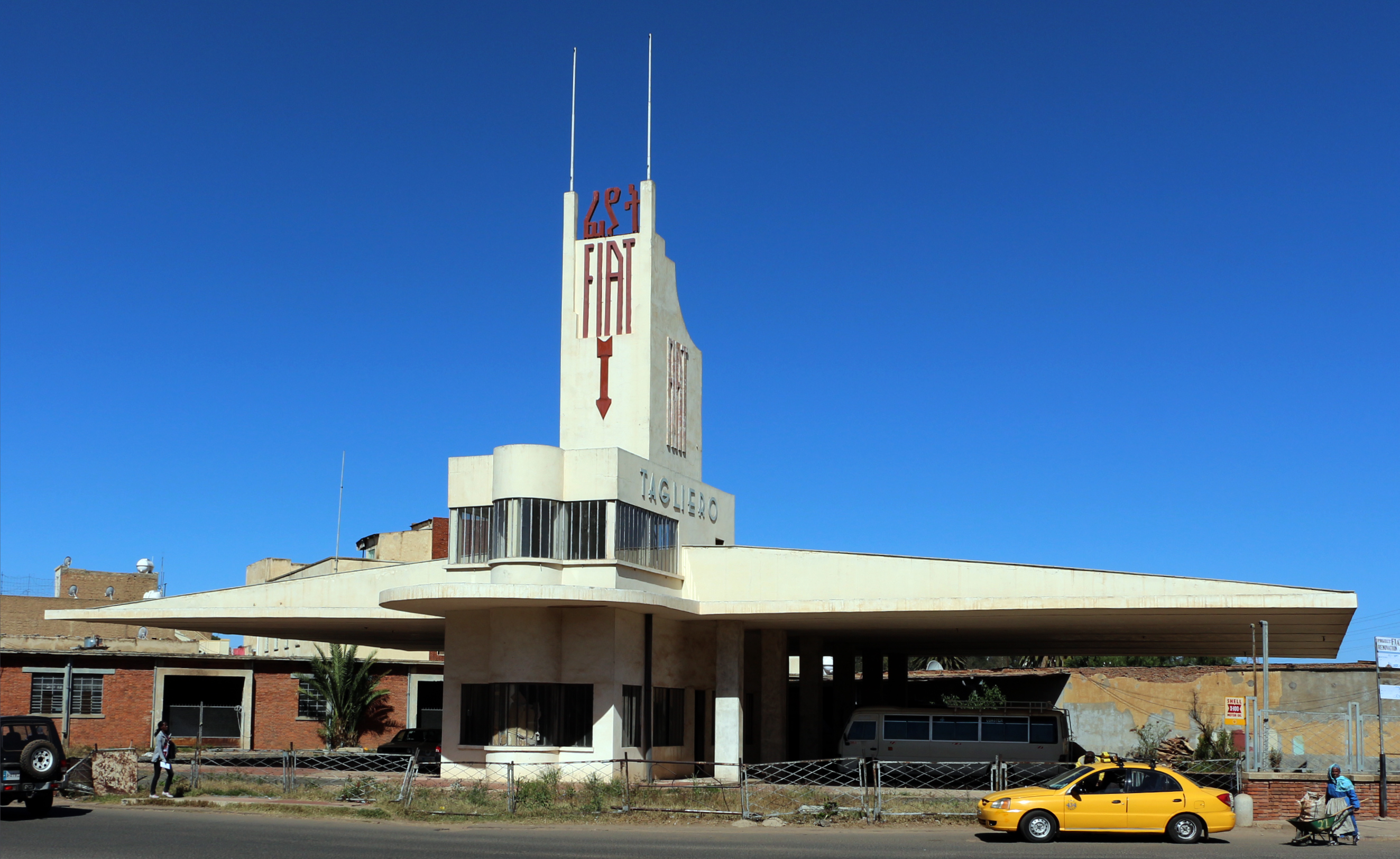
Fiat Tagliero Building

The Fiat Tagliero Building is a Futurist-style filling station in Asmara, Eritrea. It was completed in 1938 and designed by the Italian engineer Giuseppe Pettazzi.

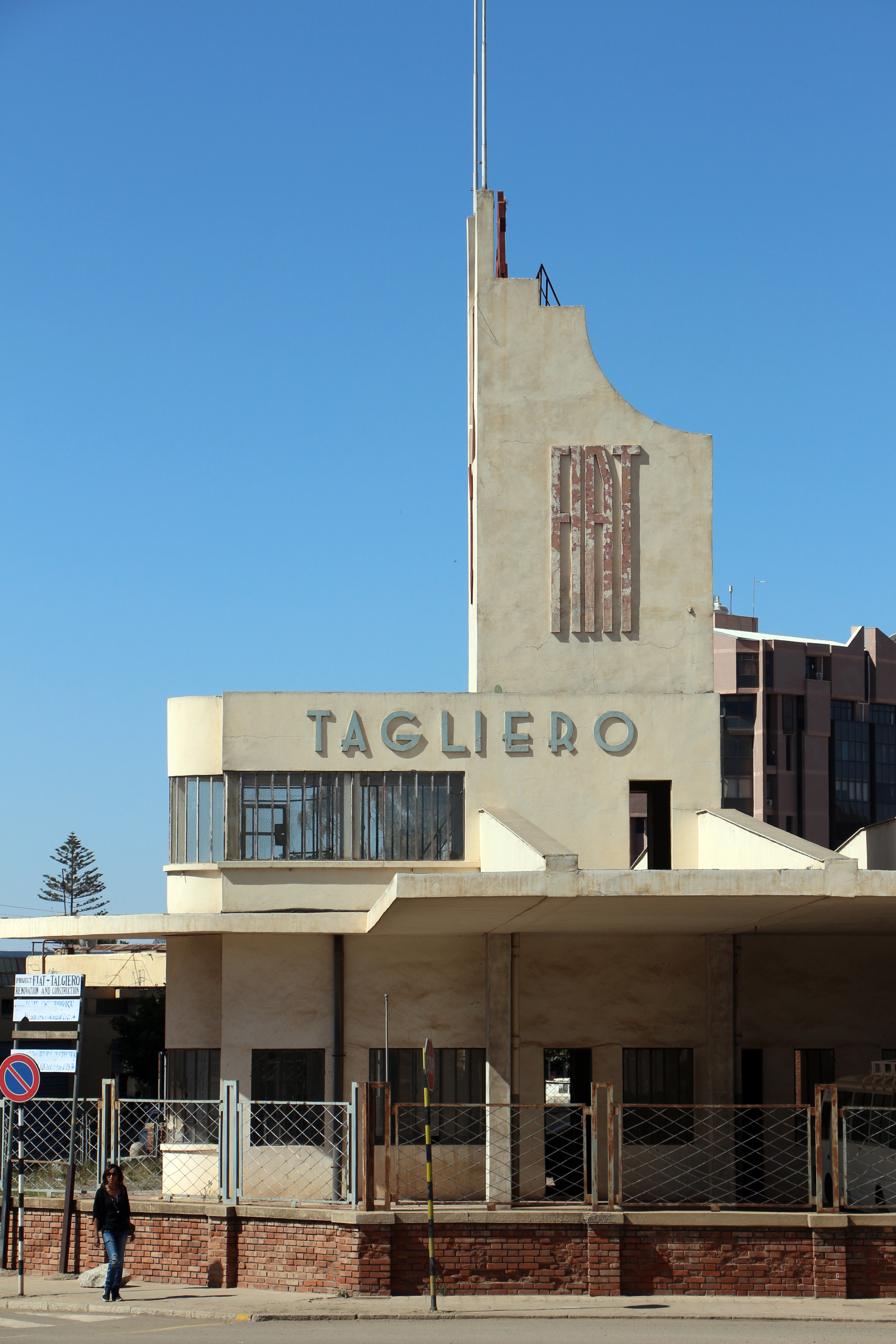
Side view

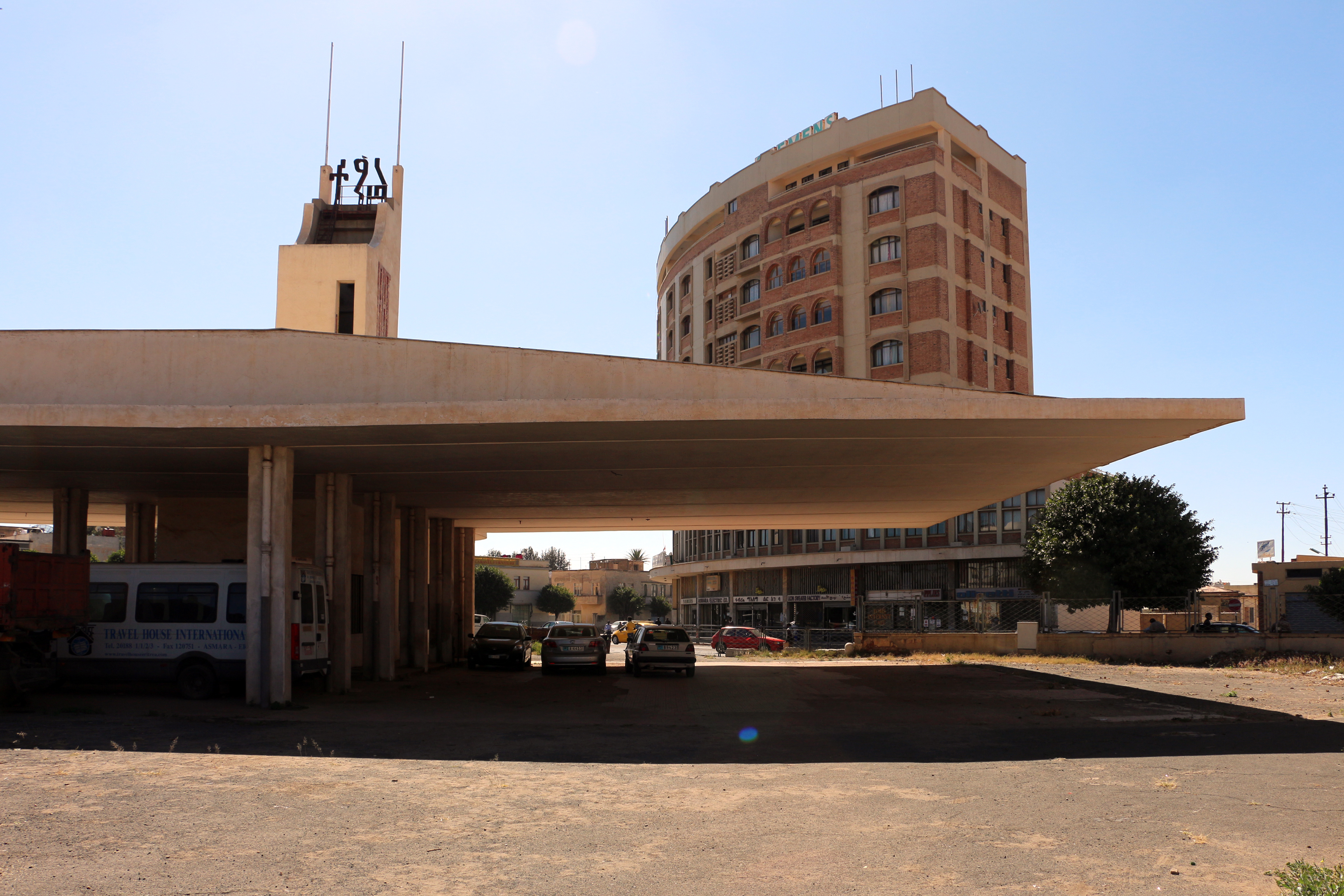
Back view

== Historical background ==
Conceived as a simple fuel station owned by Dr. Tagliero (the Fiat concessionary in Asmara), the building was designed by Engr. Pettazzi as a futuristic structure that resembled an aeroplane incorporating a central tower with office space, cashiers desk and shop — and supporting a pair of huge 15m cantilevered, reinforced concrete wings.

During construction, local authorities required each wing to be supported by pillars, and original plans, found in 2001, depicted the supports. Pettazzi maintained the supports were unnecessary and reportedly settled the argument by threatening to kill the contractor if the supports were not removed. In the end the supports were removed and the wings held.

During World War II the Fiat Tagliero was partially hit by British bombing, but survived without huge damage: the wings proved to be very well built and did not collapse.

When Italian architect Giuseppe Pettazzi inaugurated Eritrea’s plane-shaped Fiat Tagliero service station in 1938, he stunned onlookers by pulling out a gun. There, the story behind Africa’s finest piece of Futurist architecture goes hazy. In one version, Pettazzi stood defiantly on one of his 18m concrete “wings”—used as decorative shades for cars entering the garage—and threatened to kill himself should the structure collapse as wooden supports were pulled away. In another, the excitable architect held the gun to the head of a disbelieving builder, who had hesitated to pull away the struts for fear the long slabs would tumble down. Either way, the wings stayed up, nobody was shot, and Pettazzi’s design skills were vindicated. Seven decades on, this extraordinary piece of Italian art deco, which resembles a plane at take-off, is still standing in Asmara, the central capital of this former Italian colony. The Fiat Tagliero, named for the car firm and the old gas station’s owner, is one of 400 buildings that make the remote Eritrean capital one of the world’s most fascinating centres for Art Deco and other architectural styles.

— Andrew Cauthorne

The building, used until recently as a Shell fuel station, remains structurally sound and has not been damaged during numerous conflicts affecting the Horn of Africa during the second half of the twentieth century. Restored in 2003, the service station is "Category I" listed in Eritrea, meaning no part of the building may be altered: it is one of the most important Art Deco buildings that gave to the city of Asmara the UNESCO approval to be a World Heritage Site in July 2017.

== See also ==
- Asmara: a Modernist City of Africa (UNESCO World Heritage)
- Giuseppe Pettazzi
- Italian Eritrea
- Cinema Impero, another famous "Art Deco" building in Asmara
