= Governor's Palace, Asmara =

City hall of Asmara, Eritrea

Coordinates: 15°20′10″N 38°56′29″E

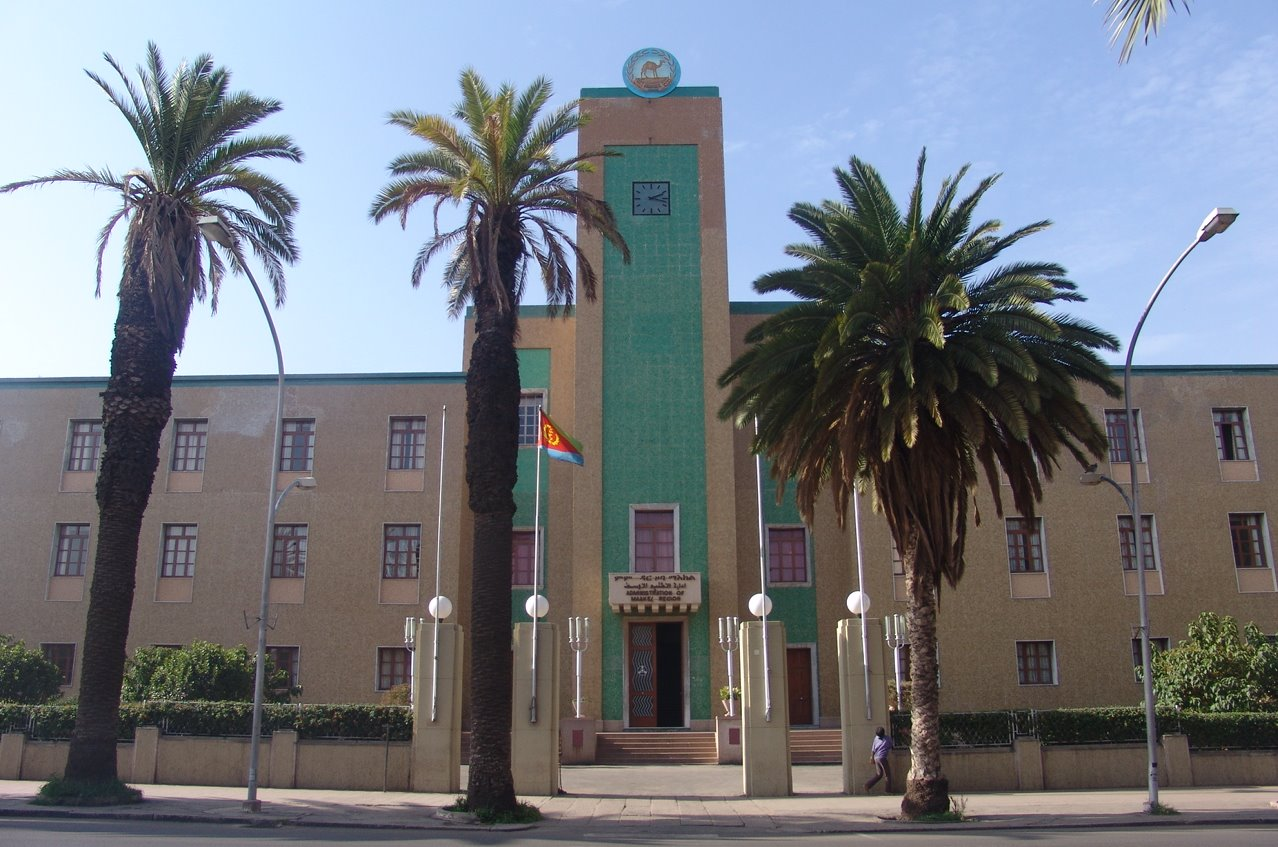
Governor's Palace or City Hall of Asmara

The Governor's Palace is the city hall of Asmara, Eritrea. It was built during the colonial period in the city centre, in an Italian Art Deco style.

== Overview ==
The former Italian government's palace was built in 1897 by Ferdinando Martini, the first Italian governor of Eritrea (now it is the Asmara President's Office). The Gibi, as it is known, was converted into the Museum of Asmara during the Ethiopian administration, when the Governor's Palace was moved to its present building.

The current city hall was built during the 1930s in typical Fascist style (called Littorio), with a central tower at the entrance adorned with "Fasci" (destroyed in March 1941, when the city was conquered by the British). It is located next to the Court House and the Ministry of Justice of the Republic of Eritrea, in the central section of Asmara that has been named a World Heritage Site by the UNESCO in 2017.

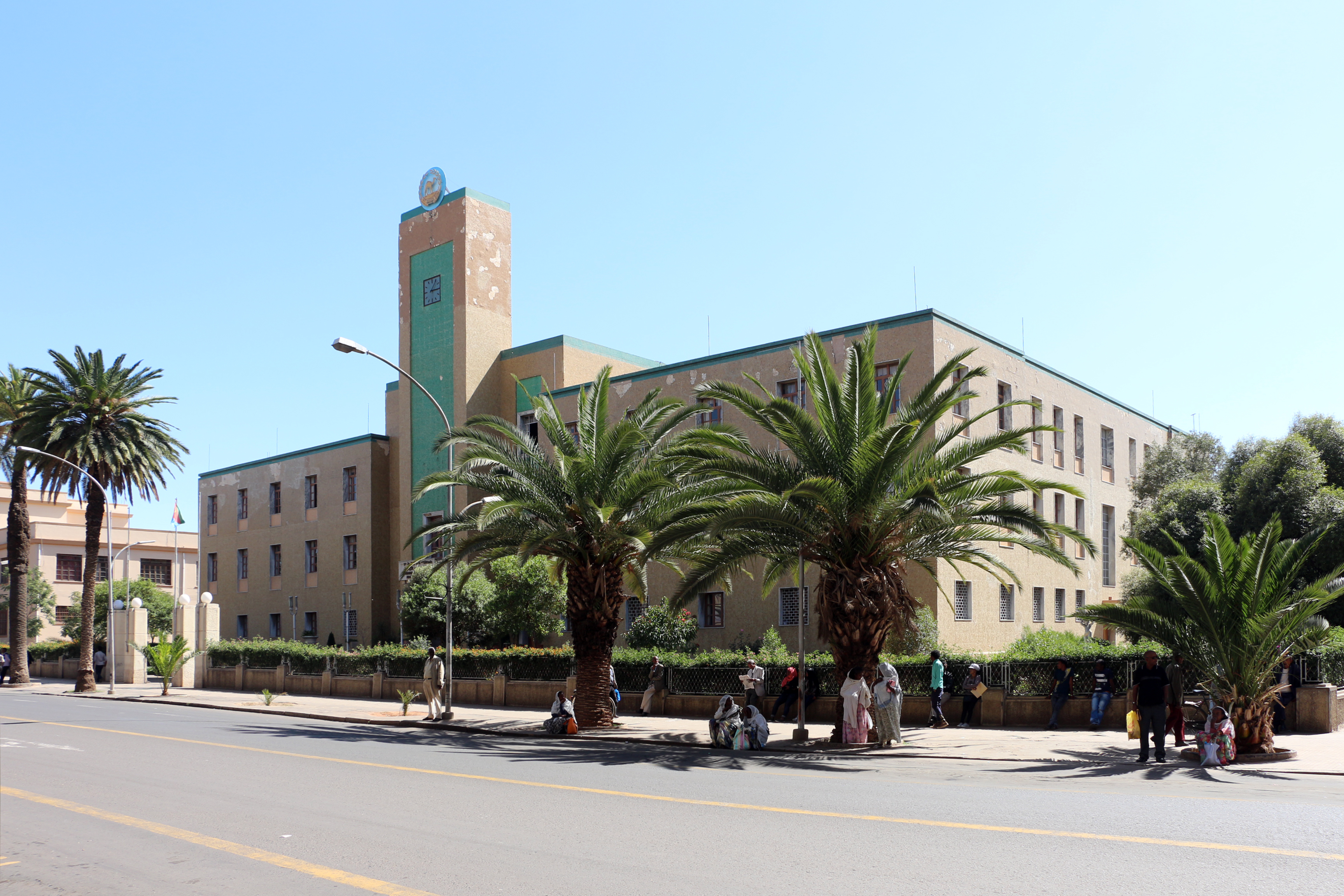
The Asmara City Hall, as appeared on the city's last revenue stamps of 1960.

The Asmara City Hall appeared on Asmara's last revenue stamps, which were issued in 1960.

== Bibliography ==
- Edward Denison, Guang Yu Ren, Naigzy Gebremedhin and Guang Yu Ren. Asmara: Africa's secret modernist city New York, 2003 (ISBN 1-85894-209-8)
- Antoinette Jeanson, Paul-Antoine Martin. Asmara, la petite Rome africaine. Paris, 2015 (ISBN 978-2-343-05684-5)

== See also ==
- Asmara
- Italian Eritrea
