= Giuseppe Pettazzi =

Italian Art Deco and Futurist civil engineer

- Born: Giuseppe Petazzi; 3 May 1907
- Died: 8 October 2001 (aged 94)

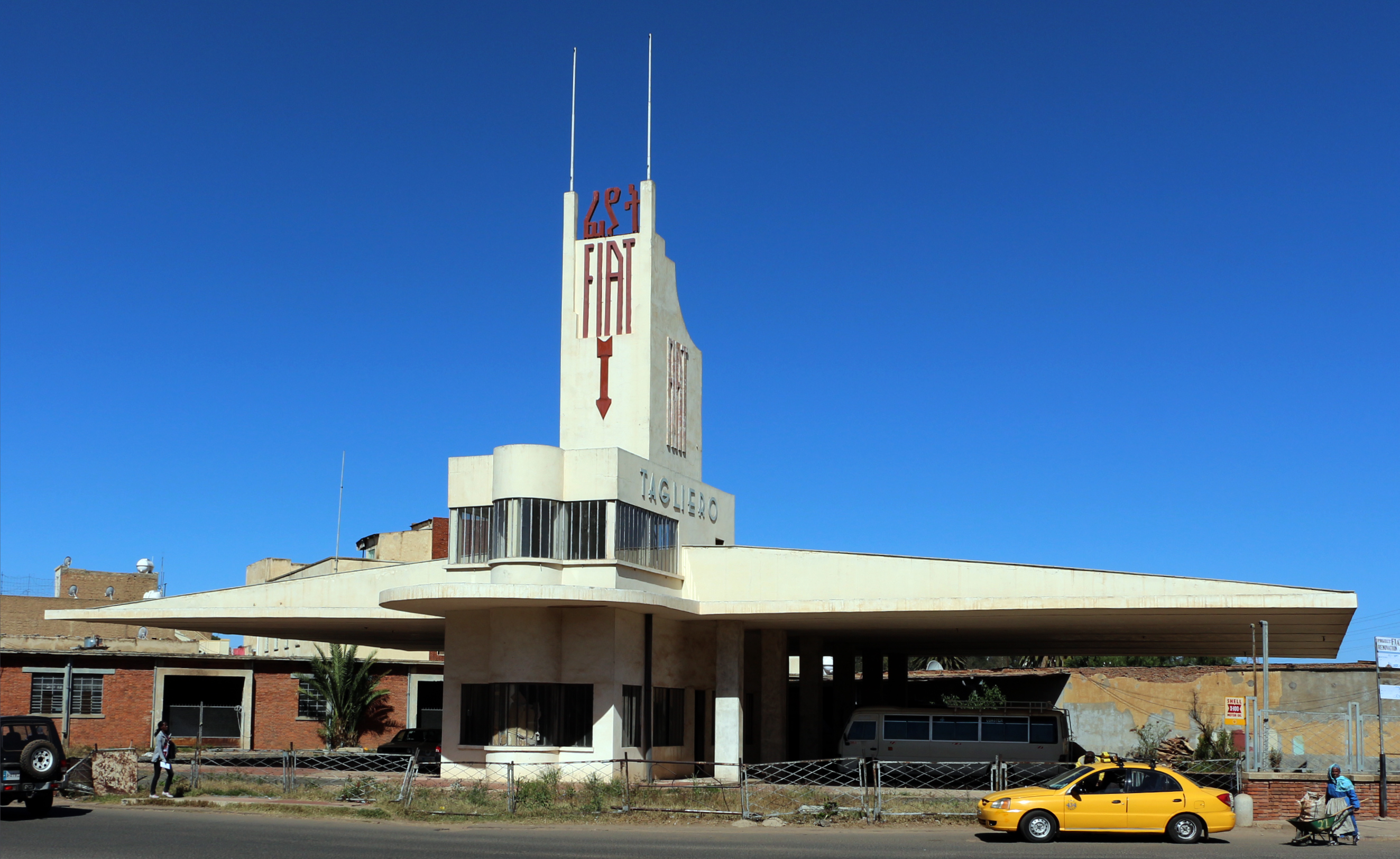
The Fiat Tagliero Building in Asmara

Giuseppe Pettazzi (3 May 1907 - 8 October 2001) was an Italian Art Deco and Futurist civil engineer of the 1930s.

He built many buildings in Eritrea during Italian colonial rule. They included the Fiat Tagliero Building in Asmara, described as "probably the world's most beautiful petrol station, and also one of the world's supreme examples of Futurism". Modelled after an airplane, when it was opened in 1938, workers refused to remove the props for the building's ambitious "wings", and it is claimed Pettazzi forced them to do so at gunpoint.
