= New Eritrea Party =

Political party in Eritrea

- President: Omar Mohammed Baduri
- Founded: September 29, 1947
- Dissolved: 1952
- Ideology: Italophilia and Independentism

The New Eritrea Party (in Tigrinya language: Mahber Hadas Ertra) was a political party in Eritrea. It was founded, as the New Eritrea Pro-Italy Party (Partito nuova Eritrea pro-Italia), on September 29, 1947 by members of the Eritrea War Veterans Association and the Italo-Eritrean Association. The party advocated Italian trusteeship over Eritrea in preparation for full Eritrean national independence.

Omar Mohammed Baduri was the president of the party, Blatta Mohamed Abdella Ali the vice president.

The party was one of four Eritrean political parties that were invited to attend the April–May 1949 session of the United Nations General Assembly on the Eritrean question. Two representatives of the party travelled to New York City, Mohammed Abdulla and Mohammed Tatok. At the United Nations, Mohammed Abdulla affirmed the position of the party in supporting Italian trusteeship in preparation for independence. However, during their stay in New York the representatives of the different pro-independence parties forged close bonds and began to articulate common positions regarding how to achieve independence.

In May 1949 the party changed its name to 'New Eritrea Party'. At the same time it reformulated its agenda, supporting immediate independence. The party sought to build an alliance with the Moslem League. In June 1949 the party became a member of the Independence Bloc. The Independence Bloc called for immediate independence of Eritrea within its 1936 borders.

The party failed to win any seats in the 1952 election to the Eritrean assembly.
