= President's Office, Asmara =

State House

Coordinates: 15.3362°N 38.9314°E

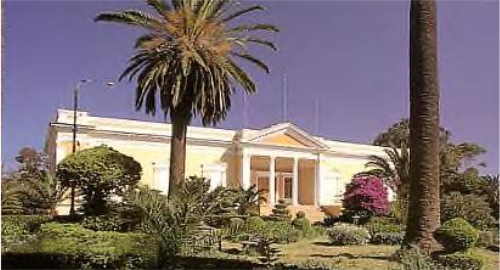
The State House in Asmara, was built in 1897.

The Asmara State House is an Eritrean government building.

== History ==
The former Italian governmental palace was built in 1897 by Ferdinando Martini, the first Italian governor of Eritrea. The Italian government wanted to create an impressive building, from which the Italian governors could show the dedication of the Kingdom of Italy to the "Colonia primogenita" (first daughter-colony) as Eritrea was called. The building was in Asmara, which had just been made capital of Eritrea.

The President of Eritrea Isaias Afewerki uses the State House for hosting Heads of States, holding diplomatic meetings, cabinet minister meetings and other government ceremonies and events.

== Structure ==
Its design adopted an Italian neoclassical style.

Governor Martini wanted a structure with colonnades at the entrance in neoclassical style, surrounded by a park with lush vegetation. In his opinion the building would be the biggest and most beautiful in Asmara.

The interior was decorated with Italian marble and furniture brought from Italy and France. The main hall was decorated with typical Renaissance stairs. The main doors were crafted with wood from the Brazilian amazon.

== See also ==
- Asmara
- Italian Eritrea
- Italian Empire
