= Eritrea (1952–1962) =

Component of the Federation of Ethiopia and Eritrea

Coordinates: 9°1.8′N 38°44.4′E

- 1952–1962
- Flag Coat of arms

- Location of autonomous Eritrea within the Federation of Ethiopia and Eritrea
- Status: Autonomous region
- Capital: Asmara
- Common languages: Amharic; Tigrinya; Arabic
- Emperor of Ethiopia
  - 1952–1962: Haile Selassie
- Emperor's Representative
  - 1952–1959: Andargachew Messai
  - 1959–1962: Abiye Abebe
- Chief Executive of Eritrea
  - 1952–1955: Tedla Bairu
  - 1955 (acting): Araya Wassie
  - 1955–1962: Asfaha Woldemikael
- Legislature: Legislative Assembly of Eritrea
- Historical era: Cold War
  - Federation: 15 September 1952
  - Eritrean War of Independence: 1 September 1961
  - Withdrawal of autonomy: 15 November 1962
- Currency: Ethiopian birr
- ISO 3166 code: ER
Preceded by	Succeeded by
British Military Administration (Eritrea)	Province of Eritrea
- Today part of: Eritrea

Between 1952 and 1962, Eritrea was an autonomous component of the Federation of Ethiopia and Eritrea.

== Background ==
Eritrea came under Italian administration in 1882 and was absorbed into Italian East Africa in 1936. Eritrea was occupied by British forces during World War II in 1941. Following the conclusion of hostilities in 1945, Eritrea remained under British administration until 1952, when it was federated with the Ethiopia before being annexed by the Ethiopian Empire in 1962 as Eritrea Province.

== Governance ==
Under the terms of UN General Assembly Resolution 390A of 2 December 1950, Eritrea and Ethiopia were linked through a loose federal structure under the sovereignty of the Emperor. Eritrea had its own administrative, legislative and judicial organs, its own flag and emblem, and control over its domestic affairs, including police, local administration, and taxation.

=== Emperor's Representative ===
#	Name	Assumed office	Left office
1	Andargachew Messai	15 September 1952	December 1959
2	Abiye Abebe	December 1959	14 Nov 1962

=== Chief Executive / Chief Administrator ===
#	Name	Assumed office	Left office	Notes
1	Tedla Bairu	15 September 1952	29 July 1955	
2	Araya Wassie	29 July 1955	8 August 1955	Acting
3	Asfaha Woldemikael	8 August 1955	14 November 1962	As "Chief Administrator" from 20 May 1960

=== Legislative Assembly ===
==== Elected in 1952 ====
Party	Seats
Unionist Party	32
Democratic Front	18
Muslim League of the Western Province	15
Independent Muslim League of Massawa	1
Nationalist Party	1
Independents	1
Total	68
Source: Omer

==== Elected in 1956 ====
Party	Seats
Unionist Party	32
Anti-unionists and others	36
Total	68
