= Asfaha Woldemikael =

Eritrean and Ethiopian politician

Bitwoded Asfaha Woldemikael
- ኣስፍሃ ወልደሚካኤል

2nd Chief Executive of Eritrea
- In office 8 August 1955 – 15 November 1962
- Monarch: Haile Selassie
- Preceded by: Tedla Bairu
- Succeeded by: Office abolished

Vice Imperial Representative of the Federation of Ethiopia and Eritrea
- In office 1955 – 15 November 1962
- Monarch: Haile Selassie
- Representative: Andargachew Messai
- Preceded by: Office established
- Succeeded by: Office abolished

Personal details
- Born: 1914 Akrur, Akele Guzai, Italian Eritrea (now Eritrea)
- Died: 2002 (aged 87–88)
- Occupation: Politician, interpreter

Asfaha Woldemikael (Tigrinya: ኣስፍሃ ወልደሚካኤል, romanized: Asfaha Wolde-Mika'el; 1914 – 2002) was an Eritrean and Ethiopian politician and interpreter who was the Chief Executive of Eritrea from 1955 to 1962. He supported the annexation of Eritrea to the Ethiopian Empire.

== Biography ==
Asfaha Woldemikael was born in 1914 in Akrur, Akele Guzai, then a part of Italian Eritrea. He attended primary school in Segeneiti. He worked for the Italian colonial government as an interpreter from 1932 to 1941.

In 1941, Asfaha joined the Ministry of Foreign Affairs of the Ethiopian Empire. He was the president of the Association for Uniting Eritrea with Ethiopia. In 1952, following the establishment of the Federation of Ethiopia and Eritrea, he was appointed as Eritrea's imperial vice representative under Andargachew Messai.

On 23 July 1955, Ethiopian emperor Haile Selassie forced Tedla Bairu, the Chief Executive of Eritrea, to resign after he suspended habeas corpus to combat shifta activity. Asfaha was elected by the Eritrean Assembly to succeed Tedla in a 48–17 vote. Asfaha assumed office on 8 August 1955. As chief executive, Asfaha moved Eritrea towards full annexation into Ethiopia. His position was secured following the 1956 Eritrean parliamentary election after he packed the Eritrean Assembly with pro-annexation candidates.

Shortly after coming to power, Asfaha banned the use of Arabic by federal institutions in Eritrea and mandated the use of Amharic. The Muslim Mosques Committee of Asmara denounced this action as violating article 38 of the constitution guaranteeing the use of Arabic in Eritrea. In April 1958, Asfaha banned all Eritrean political parties and federal allowed security forces to arrest and imprison anyone for up to ten days without charges. That same year, he suppressed and a general strike. Under Asfaha, the Eritrean Assembly ceased flying the Eritrean flag after 24 December 1958. On 14 November 1962, Asfaha read a speech in Asmara that declared the dissolution of the federation and announced Eritrea's full annexation into Ethiopia. This went into full effect the following day. Asfaha was chief executive until the federation's dissolution.

Asfaha was the Minister of Justice of Ethiopia during the 1970s.

Asfaha was Catholic.

== See also ==
- List of colonial governors of Eritrea

Political offices
New office	Vice Imperial Representative of the Federation of Ethiopia and Eritrea; 1952–1962	Office abolished
Preceded by Tedla Bairu	Chief Executive of Eritrea; 1955–1962	Office abolished
