= Federation of Ethiopia and Eritrea =

Federation between Eritrea to the Ethiopian Empire from 1952 to 1962

Coordinates: 9°1.8′N 38°44.4′E

Federation of Ethiopia and Eritrea የኢትዮጵያ-ኤርትራ ፌዴሬሽን (Amharic) الاتحاد الإثيوبي الإريتري (Arabic) ፈደረሽን ኤርትርያ ኢትዮጵያ (Tigrinya)
- 1952–1962
- Flag of Ethiopia and Eritrea
- Anthem: Ityopp'ya Hoy; Ethiopia, Be Happy
- Coat of arms of Ethiopia (left) and Eritrea (right)

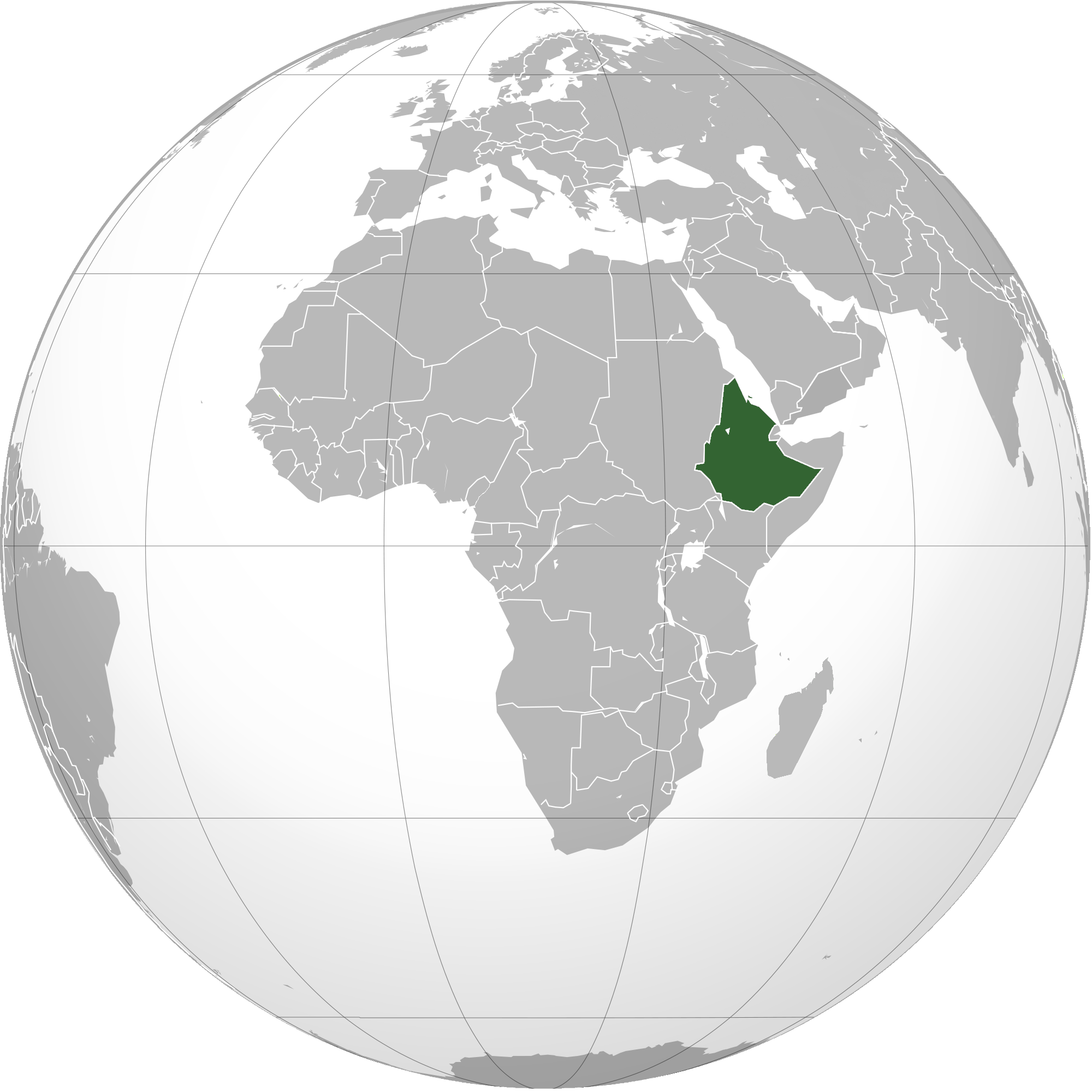
- Location of the Federation of Ethiopia and Eritrea
- Status: Federation
- Capital: Addis Ababa
- Common languages: Amharic; Tigrinya; Arabic
- Emperor of Ethiopia
  - 1952–1962: Haile Selassie
- Emperor's Representative
  - 1952–1959: Andargachew Messai
  - 1959–1962: Abiye Abebe
- Chief Executive of Eritrea
  - 1952–1955: Tedla Bairu
  - 1955 (acting): Araya Wassie
  - 1955–1962: Asfaha Woldemikael
- Legislature: Imperial Federal Council
- Historical era: Cold War
  - Federation: 15 September 1952
  - Eritrean War of Independence: 1 September 1961
  - Withdrawal of autonomy: 15 November 1962
- Currency: Ethiopian birr
Preceded by	Succeeded by
British Military Administration (Eritrea); Ethiopian Empire	Province of Eritrea; Ethiopian Empire
- Today part of: Ethiopia; Eritrea

The Federation of Ethiopia and Eritrea was a federation between the former Italian colony of Eritrea and the Ethiopian Empire between 1952 and 1962. It was established as a result of the renunciation of Italy’s rights and titles to territorial possessions in Africa, inclusive of all its established territories or colonies made effective by the Treaty of Paris of 1947. The fate of Eritrea was contingent on numerous political, social, and economic ideals of Eritreans that ranged from leftists favoring independence, conservatives favoring Ethiopian crown rule, and Eritreans who favored a political union of the two sides of the spectrum. In an attempt to provide Eritrea with ultimate autonomy under an Eritrean curated constitution and governmental elections, UN Resolution 390 (A) was devised to implement such welfare to the individuals it was to be imposed upon.

== History ==
Eritrea was placed under the decree of the British Military Administration (BMA) in April 1941 which was soon to be called the British Administration in 1949 - continuing until the discharge of the federation on 15 September 1952, concurrent with the signing of the Termination of Powers Proclamation. Following the implementation of the Treaty of Peace with Italy which came into effect on 15 September 1947, the Four Power Commission of Investigation were tasked with making internal inquiries in Eritrea to determine the most effective method of governance following the disbandment with its Italian colonizers. The commission was devised of the major powers of the time, namely the United Kingdom, the Soviet Union, the United States, and France, in which if a single conclusion could not be made within the constraints of a year, the matter was to be referred elsewhere. The General Assembly formulated a United Nations Commission for Eritrea for further consideration in November 1949. Using the consultation and advice of international governments regarding the status of Eritrea, the report was presented at the Fifth Session of the United Nations, of which the General Assembly favored the resolution set by the Burma and South African schools of thought in accordance to a federation between Ethiopia and Eritrea. Following this session, a draft of the Eritrean constitution based on democratic pretensions was to be drafted and studied and adopted by the Eritrean Assembly as well as the Federal Act to be included as a sort of federal constitution. The final stage of implementation was to obtain the ratification of the Emperor of Ethiopia of both the constitution and Federal Act. The Commissioner, Mr. Eduardo Anze Matienzo, reported back to the General Assembly in its Seventh Session in December 1952, receiving a unanimous popular vote.

=== The Bevin–Sforza Plan ===
When the Four Power Commission failed to reach agreement, the question of Eritrea's future passed to the United Nations General Assembly, where the Italian Foreign Minister Count Sforza negotiated a compromise with the British Foreign Secretary Ernest Bevin during the Assembly's third session, held in Paris in late 1948 and continued at Lake Success in early 1949. The resulting "Bevin–Sforza Plan," submitted as a British resolution, proposed a UN trusteeship over Libya divided between British-administered Cyrenaica and Italian-administered Tripolitania, continued Italian trusteeship over Somaliland, and the partition of Eritrea, with the east united to Ethiopia and the west annexed to the Anglo-Egyptian Sudan.

The proposed annexation of western Eritrea to Sudan was rejected by a UN political committee, while a modified version uniting only eastern Eritrea with Ethiopia was initially carried by 37 votes to 11. When the remaining elements of the plan came to a final vote in the General Assembly plenary, however, several Latin American delegations reversed their earlier support after the defeat of Italy's claims over Tripolitania and Cyrenaica, and the measure fell short of the required two-thirds majority, leaving Eritrea's status unresolved. Italy subsequently shifted to advocating Eritrean "independence" as a fallback position, paving the way for a further United Nations Commission of Enquiry.

=== United Nations Commission of Enquiry ===
In November 1949, the General Assembly's Fourth Session appointed a five-member Commission of Enquiry, composed of Burma, Guatemala, Norway, Pakistan and South Africa, to visit Eritrea and consult its inhabitants on the territory's future. The delegates met at Lake Success on 10 January 1950 to plan their programme before travelling to Eritrea. A correspondent for The Times, quoted in a contemporary account, reported that the Commission's tours of the highlands found support for union with Ethiopia running as high as 95 percent among the Christian population, and that the Italian-backed Independence Bloc was losing members as parts of the Muslim League and other parties shifted toward conditional union.

The Commission could not agree on a single recommendation. Burma, South Africa and Norway jointly reported on conditions in Eritrea but split on policy: Burma and South Africa proposed that Eritrea become a self-governing unit federated with Ethiopia under the Ethiopian Crown, with the federal government holding authority over defence, external affairs, finance and communications. Norway, in a separate opinion, argued for outright reunion rather than federation, on the grounds that the two territories were economically interdependent and that federation would leave Eritrea's status unsettled. Guatemala and Pakistan, in a minority report, recommended a ten-year United Nations trusteeship over Eritrea followed by independence.

On 2 December 1950 the General Assembly voted 46 to 10, with 4 abstentions, to adopt Resolution 390 A (V), endorsing the federal solution proposed by Burma and South Africa. Anze Matienzo, the Bolivian delegate to the United Nations, was appointed United Nations Commissioner for Eritrea to oversee the transition.

=== Political parties' uprisings ===
From 1941 until 1952, the British Administration acted as an intermediate governing appointment as the political interest and socioeconomic well-being of the Eritrean people was being assessed to form a more autonomous predication. The emergence of political parties was initiated with Haile Selassie’s return to the Ethiopian throne in May of 1941, where to immediate effect he set out on the acquisition of Eritrea and Somaliland into the Ethiopian state. This political perspective was synonymous with the organization known as 'Mahbar Feqri Hagar Eretra’ (Society for the Love of the Land of Eritrea) which would then become the Unionist Party in 1944. Most Eritreans during this time did not favor the alignment of the Ethiopian crown and Eritrea. The emanation of the Unionist Party was challenged two years later with the materialization of the Moslem League in 1946 which incurred enormous following from the mostly-Muslim western part of the country, and a small portion from the Christian Highlands. A segmentation from the Moslem League was erected in 1947 and came to be known as the National Moslem Party of Massawa. Following was another predominantly Muslim organization known as the New Eritrean Pro-Italy Party maintaining a large Italian community supporting the ideology that if Rome desired to reacquire Eritrea, Italy would assist in obtaining its independence. A predominantly Christian party was also incurred in February 1948 known as the Eritrean Liberal Progressive Party, opposing any union with Ethiopia. On 25 July 1949, the Independence Bloc was devised and consisted of all major parties except the Unionist. Political parties continued to branch off from their original predecessors to represent more refined interests and many secluded to form singular parties representing the dominant political aspiration. Affiliation with political parties was no more strictly determinate on religious alliance as it was with geographical locale. However, parties often shared common interests, such as regional - highland versus lowland - and faith - Muslim versus Christian. Most of the parties sustained an anti-union sentiment which was met with intimidation and interference by the Ethiopian crown.

Tensions between the British Administration and the Unionist movement turned violent in 1946. On 28 July, a Unionist demonstration in Massawa was broken up by police, with participants later sentenced to as much as three years' imprisonment. A month later, on 28 August 1946, following a dispute in Asmara's native quarter, troops of the Sudan Defence Force left their barracks with machine guns and armoured cars and fired on the Eritrean civilian population for nearly three hours, killing fifty-nine Eritreans and wounding thirty-three; ten Italians were also hit, one fatally. Ten Sudanese soldiers were later convicted of murder, with sentences of up to fifteen years' penal servitude, though the findings of a British court of inquiry were never disclosed and compensation to victims' families was refused by the British government; Emperor Haile Selassie donated £2,000 to a relief committee for the victims.

== Eritrean federation with Ethiopia ==
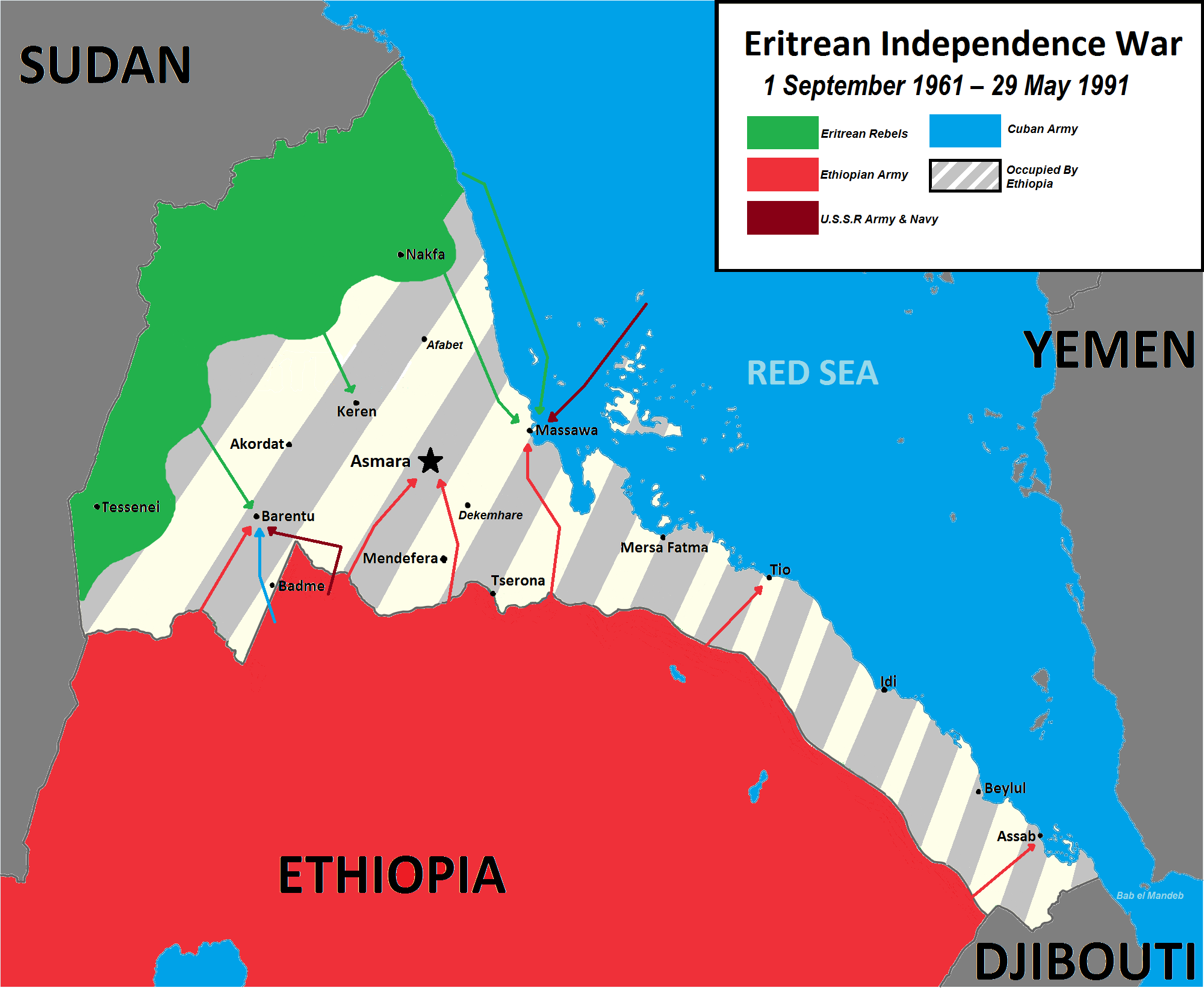
Map of Eritrea in 1970s situation

After being a colony of Italy since 1882, Eritrea was placed under British military administration in 1941 during the East African Campaign. In 1947, Italy renounced all rights to Eritrea under a peace treaty. In December 1950, the UN General Assembly passed Resolution 390 A (V), making Eritrea an autonomous unit federated with Ethiopia under the Ethiopian Crown. Eritrea formally became a constituent state of the federation of Ethiopia and Eritrea on 15 September 1952.

Elections for the Eritrean Assembly were held in March 1952. Voting was by secret ballot in Asmara and Massawa, but elsewhere the British Administration used an indirect system, drawing constituency boundaries without Eritrean participation. The apportionment of seats drew complaints from Unionist districts: Hamasien received seven seats compared with twelve each for Serae and Akele Guzai and twenty-four for the Western Province. Women were excluded from the franchise; the Eritrean Constitution as ratified likewise limited voting rights to male citizens aged twenty-one and over.

The Unionist Party won the largest number of seats, 32, followed by the Independence Front with 18 and the Muslim League of the Western Province with 15, with one seat each going to the National Party of Massawa and the Independent Moslem League. On 29 April 1952 the Assembly elected Unionist leader Tedla Bairou as its President by a vote of 49 to 11.

The Assembly debated the Commissioner's draft constitution beginning 12 May 1952, adopted Tigrinya and Arabic as official languages, and passed the final text unanimously on 10 July 1952. Emperor Haile Selassie ratified the Federal Act and the Eritrean Constitution at the Menelik Palace in Addis Ababa on 11 September 1952. Formal transfer of power took place on 15 September 1952, when the Chief British Administrator, Duncan C. Cumming, lowered the Union Jack in Asmara before a large crowd. The British Administration subsequently charged the Ethiopian government more than £900,000 for stores and equipment left in the territory.

From its inception, the federation was undermined by the Eritrean government, which was controlled by the Unionist Party. The party had campaigned for complete union with Ethiopia and worked against the federal arrangement throughout its existence. The first Chief Executive, Tedla Bairu, governed without consulting his cabinet or the Eritrean Assembly and repeatedly violated constitutional provisions. His successor, Asfaha Woldemikael, elected in August 1955, simultaneously held the role of vice-representative of the Emperor, making any meaningful separation of Eritrean and Ethiopian authority nominal in practice. By 1958 the constitution had effectively ceased to function. On 15 November 1962, the Eritrean Assembly voted unanimously to dissolve the federation and incorporate Eritrea into the Ethiopian Empire as a province.

The Eritrean Liberation Front (ELF) was established in Cairo in July 1960 by Eritrean exiles, drawn largely from the political tradition of the Moslem League. Hamid Idris Awate began armed resistance on 1 September 1961, marking the start of the Eritrean War of Independence. By the mid-1960s, the Ethiopian government had deployed its Second Division against the ELF, marking a significant escalation of the conflict.
