= Ibrahim Sultan =

Ibrahim Sultan can refer to:

- Ibrahim Sultan ibn Shahrukh (died 1435), a Timurid prince who governed Fars
- Ibrahim Sultan Ali (1909–1987), an Eritrean independence activist
