= Woldeab Woldemariam =

Eritrean academic, educator, journalist and nationalist politician (1905–1995)

Personal details
- Born: April 27, 1905 , Italian Eritrea
- Died: May 15, 1995 (age 90) Asmara, Eritrea

Woldeab Woldemariam (ወልደአብ ወልደማርያም), also spelled Weldeab Weldemariam, (April 27, 1905 – May 15, 1995) was an Eritrean revolutionary and political figure of origin who was one of the original proponents of the Eritrean Independence movement and an uncompromising advocate of freedom considered by many Eritreans as fathers of Eritrea nationalism. He worked closely with Ibrahim Sultan Ali after the Federation with Ethiopia to secure Eritrean Independence.

Woldemariam (also known by his nickname as WelWel) was a teacher, journalist, radical revolutionary, a great debater and an uncompromising advocate of freedom. His commitment to individual freedom, democracy and justice was as unshakable as his commitment to the unity of Eritrea and the dignity of its people. The clarity of his thinking, which was expressed in his newspaper articles of the 19 xx1943, is now available to a new generation, compiled in a book (Mirutsat Anqetsat Ato Woldeab, 1944–1991). The book was edited by Tikabo Aresi'e and published in 1995.

He was a devout Christian of the Protestant congregation.

== Teaching ==
In 1931 he was assigned by his then employer, the Swedish Evangelical Mission (SEM) school, to teach in a village called Suzana. This was his first exposure to the Kunama people. He was a teacher in this school through 1935 until he was moved to Asmara.

In Asmara he was promoted to direct the entire SEM school system, which he continued to do until 1942. During this time he popularized the use of Tigrinya and published two textbooks which would remain standard texts for over twenty years.

== Political career ==
In 1942 he left the SEM and at the behest of the British Military Administration, became an editor for the Tigrinya language newspaper. After a trip to Addis Ababa, he became a chief opponent of unification with Ethiopia. Chief among his fears of uniting Eritrea with Ethiopia beside his love of his Eritrean people and country was the corruption and poverty that he saw when he visited Addis Ababa. In 1946 he brought together Christian and Muslim nationalists to advocate for the independence of Eritrea from Ethiopia.

Between 1947 and 1953 he was subjected to seven assassination attempts. After the federation with Ethiopia by the United Nations he continued to advocate Eritrean independence by creating mass organizations, particularly with the help of labor organizations.

In 1953 another attempt was made on his life, suffering injuries which left him hospitalized for five months. While in the hospital he was elected to the National Assembly, however, his election was annulled by Tedla Bairu. After the annulment of the election he was forced to seek asylum in Egypt.

== Struggle for Independence ==
During the Eritrean War of Independence, he was not able to exert authority over political or military forces in Eritrea. It was not until 1987 and the Unity Congress of the Eritrean People's Liberation Front that he reentered Eritrea. He was finally reunited with his family in Asmara at the close of the Eritrean war of Independence.

== Quotes ==
- "Up to now, I have never served nor become a messenger for any foreign power or interest. I am an enemy to any kind of slavery, in all its shapes and colors. No man, be he European or African, can force me into the yoke of any kind of bondage. If there be some one who dares to attempt my assassination in order to force me to submit to doing things contrary to my feeling and will, then I also have in me the courage to die for my political beliefs, for the cause of liberty of my country, and for the genuine interest of my brothers and sisters."
- "I always said, 'I am not a Christian, I am not a highlander. I am an Eritrean.'"

== Relevant literature ==
- Saulsberry, Nicole Denise. "The life and times of Woldeab Woldemariam, 1905-1995." (2003). Doctoral dissertation, Stanford University.
