= Ibrahim Sultan Ali =

Man behind the unified creation of Eritrea

Ibrahim Sultan Shiekh Ibrahim Sultan Ali

Personal details
- Born: March 1909 Keren, Italian Eritrea
- Died: September 11, 1987 (aged 78) Cairo, Arab Republic of Egypt
- Resting place: Kassala, Sudan

Ibrahim Sultan Ali (March 1909 – 11 September 1987) was born in Keren. He played a part in the emancipation of Tigre in Sahel and Barka and in establishing Blocco Independenza. He was also the Secretary General of the Eritrean Democratic Front (EDF).

== Early life and education ==
Ibrahim attended Quran School under Khalifa Jaafer of the Halanga of Kassala. In Keren, he attended technical training at Salvaggio Raggi and at Umberto School in Asmara.

== Career ==
Ibrahim worked as the chief in a train station, served as a civil servant in Keren, Agordat, Tessenei, Adi Ugri and even Wiqro near Mekele for six months. He was proficient in speaking and translating Italian, Arabic, Tigre, and Tigrinya.

From 1926 to 1941, he was the head of the Islamic Affairs section in the political affairs office under Italian rule. Under the British, he served as head of Civil/Native Affairs Office until April 1943. He resigned and established a modern cheese plant in Tessenei which he ran until the end of 1945. The Eritrean Chamber of Commerce was established that year and he became one of its senior staff members until the end of September 1946. He represented Eritrea in front of the U.N. and was one of the leading, and strongest members of the ELF.

=== Political life ===
In May 1941, he was a founding member of the Patriotic Association till he helped found the Muslim League of Eritrea on December 3, 1946. The League took Keren as its headquarters till parties were shut down by Ethiopian interference in the late 1950s. Ali, who was a key figure in the establishment of Blocco Indipendenza (Independence Bloc) on July 26, 1949, was elected the secretary general of the organization. In January 1951, he partook in the establishment of the Eritrean Democratic Front (EDF) and became its secretary general. He was a member of the first Eritrean Parliament when he won election on May 15, 1952, representing the Rugbat tribe of which he was the traditional chief from 1948 to 1950.

On September 20, 1949, the United Nation discussing the future of Eritrea invited independent block Eritrean leaders, Ali made the strongest representation for Eritrean Independence. At UN, Ibrahim is quoted to have said: “If a wrong decision is taken forcing us to struggle to safeguard our identity and obtain our independence, then the members of this Committee will shoulder the responsibility for the hostilities that arise in East Africa”.

Woldeab Woldemariam said: "90% of the credit of preserving Eritrea in one piece goes to Ibrahim Sultan Ali." He added: “Ibrahim Sultan is a heroic patriot who deserves the praise, the gratitude of the entire Eritrean people”.

The Eritrean people's cause is a just cause of the independence of people who refuse and reject any form of annexation, dismemberment or a return to the hated colonialism no matter what type it would be, whatever form it takes, or from which direction it comes. This indisputable right to independence to which our country is attached can not be ignored without creating a new area of strife in East Africa, since the Eritrean people will never accept Ethiopian domination.

— Ibrahim Sultan, "Statement by the Chairman of the delegation of the Moslem League of Eritrea". Fifth session Ad Hoc Political Committee. UN. 1950-11-21.

=== Emancipation movement ===
Ibrahim was a prominent figure in the emancipation of Tigre/serfs in the 1940s. The movement was usually known as the Emancipation Movement of Serfs (Harakat Tahrir al Aqnan).

By 1946, the demands of the serfs for complete emancipation from the shumagulle were compounded by another political dilemma originating among another predominantly Muslim tribal group, the Beni-Amer. Although former Beni-Amer serfs had conducted raids against their landowners, the formerly Italian-supported Nabtab, serf revolts had begun to spread from the western Eritrean region of Gash-sedit to as far south to the borders of Ethiopia and north to the Sahel and Massawa provinces.

As civil unrest spread during 1946, the British Military Administration (BMA) began contemplating ways to bring about an effective compromise of the situation between the serfs and the embattled landowning aristocrats. In late 1946, a group of ambitious Muslim merchants and former serfs from the towns of Keren and Agorat allied under the leadership of a former interpreter for the Italian government named Ibrahim Sultan. Despite the fact that the process of serf emancipation would not be completed until 1949, the conditions between the BMA and the serf representatives succeeded in creating a system of new chiefs, sub-chiefs, and tribal subdivisions that emerged to take the place of the former system controlled by the shamagulle.

== Death ==
Ibrahim died on September 11, 1987, in Cairo, after having been sick for many years. He was buried on September 15, 1987, in Kassala, Sudan.
