= Chief Executive of Eritrea =

- Coat of arms of Eritrea during the Federation with Ethiopia
- Formation: 15 September 1952
- First holder: Tedla Bairu
- Final holder: Asfaha Woldemikael
- Abolished: 20 May 1960

The Chief Executive of Eritrea was the head of the executive branch of government of autonomous Eritrea within the Federation of Ethiopia and Eritrea. The office was established on 15 September 1952 when the federation was formed. It was first held by Tedla Bairu, president of the Unionist Party, while its last occupant was Asfaha Woldemikael. The cabinet of the Chief Executive consisted of six heads of department.

On 20 May 1960 the post was dissolved and replaced by the "Chief Administrator of Eritrea", which was appointed by the Emperor of Ethiopia Haile Selassie I. This in effect dissolved the federal structure and was a prelude to the official annexation of Eritrea as a province of Ethiopia on 14 November 1962.

== List of Chief Executives of Eritrea (1952–1960) ==
#	Name	Notes	Assumed office	Left office
1	Tedla Bairu		15 September 1952	29 July 1955
–	Araya Wassie	Acting	29 July 1955	8 August 1955
2	Asfaha Woldemikael	Continued as "Chief Administrator" until 14 November 1962	8 August 1955	20 May 1960
