= Eritrea Province =

Province of Ethiopia (1962–1993)

Province of Eritrea ኣውራጃ ኤርትራ مقاطعة إريتريا
- Province of the Ethiopian Empire, Derg regime, People's Democratic Republic of Ethiopia, and Transitional Government of Ethiopia
- 1962–1993
- Location of Eritrea within the Ethiopian Empire
- Capital: Asmara
- Government
  - Type: Provincial government
- Governor-General
  - 1962–1964: Abiye Abebe
  - 1989–1991: Tesfaye Gebre Kidan
- Historical era: Cold War
  - Autonomy withdrawn: 14 November 1962
  - Autonomy restored: 18 September 1987
  - De facto Independence: 29 May 1991
  - De jure Independence: 24 May 1993
Preceded by	Succeeded by
Eritrea (1952–1962)	Eritrea

The Province of Eritrea (Tigrinya: ኣውራጃ ኤርትራ, Arabic: مقاطعة إريتريا) was a province in the far north part of Ethiopia, with its capital city at Asmara. Eritrea gained its independence in 1993 following the Eritrean War of Independence.

== History ==
The region was historically called Medri Bahri (Land of the Sea). Its name was changed to Eritrea following the creation of the Italian Colony of Eritrea in 1890, following the expansion of Italian occupation in the area since in 1882. The borders between Italian Eritrea and the Ethiopian Empire were defined in the 1889 Treaty of Wuchale. After Italy conquered Ethiopia in 1936 and established the colony of Italian East Africa, Eritrea became part of it. During World War II it fell under British military occupation and came under United Nations supervision in 1951. On 15 September 1952, it became the Eritrean Autonomous State, federated with the Ethiopian Empire under the sovereignty of the Ethiopian crown.

Autonomy was withdrawn on 14 November 1962, following the beginning of the Eritrean War of Independence in 1961. After the Ethiopian revolution in 1974 the province was put under the reign of the Derg and later the People's Democratic Republic of Ethiopia. The province achieved de jure independence under the Eritrean People's Liberation Front in 1991 and was officially abolished by Ethiopia in 1993, becoming the independent state of Eritrea.
