= Alberto Pollio =

Italian politician

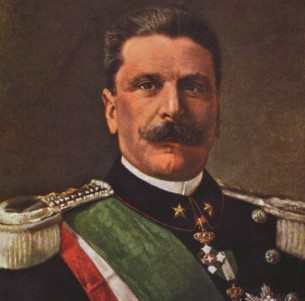
Alberto Pollio

Alberto Pollio (21 April 1852 – 1 July 1914) was an Italian general, who was Chief of Staff of the Italian army from 1908 to his death.

== Life and early career ==
Pollio was born in Caserta, son of Michele and Maria Oberty; at a young age he enrolled into the Nunziatella military school, then he attended the Military Academy of Modena, becoming in 1870 an artillery officer. In 1887 he was named aide de camp of King Umberto I, then from 1893 to 1897 military attache to the Italian embassy in Wien, then he was appointed commander of the Siena brigade and then of two different divisions of the Italian army. He wrote an essay on Napoleon and his Waterloo campaign, and one on the Battle of Custoza (1866), which drew praise even from abroad.

=== Chief of Staff ===
Pollio entered the Military academy in Naples (now the military high school) at the age of eight and became an officer in the artillery troop in April 1870. As a general staff officer, he distinguished himself through above-average performance. He wrote a number of books on previous European campaigns, which have been translated into several languages. In 1908 he became Chief of the General Staff. Due to the Italian obligations in the Triple Alliance and the simultaneous tensions with Austria-Hungary in the wake of irredentism and the opposing Balkan policies of both states, Pollio was forced to plan a war on the side of Germany and Austria against France, as well as a war against Austria in the Alps. The same applied to his Austrian counterpart Conrad von Hötzendorf.

Under Pollio, in cooperation with the German General Staff, plans were drawn up according to which, in the event of a war with France, several Italian divisions would be transferred by rail through Austrian territory to southern Baden, in order to advance towards Besançon from there. An attack through the western Alps was classified as least successful.

General Alberto Pollio died unexpectedly in July 1914. His successor was General Luigi Cadorna. He died on 1 July 1914, just as World War I was about to begin; the circumstances of his death have led some authors to claim that the apparently austrophile general was actually murdered, to make way for Cadorna, who succeeded him as Chief of Staff.

=== Personal life ===
Pollio was married to Eleonora Gormasz, an Austrian noblewoman.

Military offices
Preceded by Tancredi Saletta	Chief of Staff of the Regio Esercito; 1908–1914	Succeeded by Luigi Cadorna
