= 1952 Eritrean parliamentary election =

25–26 March 1952	1956 →
Party	Seats
Unionist Party	32
Democratic Front	18
Muslim League of the Western Province	15
Independent Muslim League of Massawa	1
Nationalist Party	1
Independents	1
This lists parties that won seats. See the complete results below.

Legislative Assembly elections were held in Eritrea on 25 and 26 March 1952. In two constituencies, a tie in the original vote led to a second round being held on 12 May.

== Electoral system ==
The elections were held under universal suffrage. In Asmara and Massawa candidates were directly elected in single-member constituencies, with Asmara having seven constituencies and Massawa two.

In the rest of the country, candidates were indirectly elected using electoral colleges, which were convened by chiefs.

== Results ==
The Democratic Front was an alliance of parties supportive of the Federation Act, including the Muslim League, the Liberal Progressive Party and the Italo-Eritrean Party.

Party	Seats
Unionist Party	32
Democratic Front	18
Muslim League of the Western Province	15
Independent Muslim League of Massawa	1
Nationalist Party	1
Independents	1
Total	68
Source: Omer

== Aftermath ==
The Muslim League of the Western Province (MLWP) held the balance of power between the two largest parties, the Unionist Party and the Democratic Front. Although the MLWP was politically closer to the Democratic Front, a rivalry between MLWP leader Ali Radaai and DF leader Ibrahim Sultan meant the two were unable to come to agreement. Instead a coalition was formed by the Unionist Party and the MLWP, with Unionist Party secretary general Tedla Bairu being elected president of the Assembly and MLWP leader Radaai being elected vice-president on 29 April.
