= Tancredi Saletta =

Italian soldier

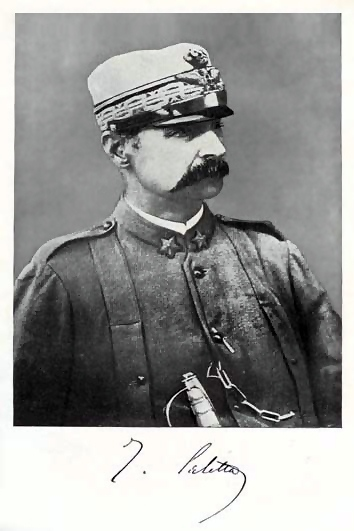
- Born: June 27, 1840; Turin
- Died: January 21, 1909 (aged 68); Rome
- Military career
- Allegiance: Kingdom of Italy
- Branch: Regio Esercito
- Rank: Tenente Generale (Lieutenant general)
- Commands: Italian Eritrea; Chief of Staff of the Italian Army
- Awards: Silver Medal of Military Valor; Bronze Medal of Military Valor

Tancredi Saletta (Turin, 27 June 1840 - Rome, 21 January 1909) was an Italian soldier, notable for his service in the early days of the Italian colony in Eritrea and for being Chief of Staff of the Italian Army from 1896 to 1908.

== Life ==
Born in Turin, Saletta joined the army at a very young age, joining the Military Academy of Turin in 1856. He fought in the 1860 campaign in the Marche, and then in the Third War of Italian Independence. He was promoted Colonel in 1880.

He led the 1,000-men strong expedition that occupied Massawa on 5 February 1882, without resistance or protest from its Egyptian garrison; he remained there until November of the same year, when he was replaced by General Carlo Genè.

Promoted to Major General in March 1887, on April of the same year Saletta was reappointed commander in Eritrea, following the Battle of Dogali, in which an Italian column of 500 soldiers was attacked and destroyed by a larger army led by Ras Alula. On November, following the arrival of General Alessandro Asinari di San Marzano with a large expeditionary corps, he returned to Italy.

Promoted to Lieutenant General in 1892, in 1896 Saletta was chosen to replace General Domenico Primerano as Chief of Staff of the Italian Army. Having been appointed a Senator in 1900, he left the position and active service in 1908 (being replaced by General Alberto Pollio).

He died in Rome in 1909.

Military offices
Preceded by Domenico Primerano	Chief of Staff of the Regio Esercito; 1896–1908	Succeeded by Alberto Pollio
