= 1956 Eritrean parliamentary election =

- 5–6 September 1956
Party	Leader	Seats
Unionist Party	Tedla Ogbit	32
Others		36
This lists parties that won seats. See the complete results below.

Assembly elections were held in Eritrea on 5 and 6 September 1956. All candidates ran as independents.

== Background ==
Elections had previously been held in 1952 during the British administration. Following the elections, article 45 of the new Eritrean constitution required that the Legislative Assembly pass a new electoral law to replace the 1951 proclamation and establish an Electoral High Commission prior to the next elections. In 1953 the Assembly rejected a draft law, and the government obtained confirmation from the Attorney General that the 1951 proclamation would still be applicable.

However, this had not been done, and in the months leading up to the 1956 elections the Muslim League asked the Supreme Court to declare them unconstitutional.

== Conduct ==
The Eritrean police force began harassing opponents of the Unionist Party government in September 1955 under the leadership of pro-Unionist Tedla Ogbit. The federal authorities also intervened to "frighten off any possible opposition", and one anti-Unionist candidate, Muhammed Omar Akito, had a bomb thrown into his living room.

However, the Supreme Court made some interventions on behalf of the opposition, demanding opposition candidate Fessha Woldermariam be released from police detainment after he was arrested a week before nominations closed. It also confirmed the victory of opposition candidate Muhammed Omar Akito, which the Assembly had declared invalid.

== Results ==
A total of 188 candidates contested the 68 seats, with 32 Unionists elected.

=== Elected members ===
Division	Elected member	Affiliation
AkeleGuzai Division	Ato Ghebrekidan Tesemma	Anti-Unionist
AkeleGuzai Division	Bashai Habte Tesfamikael	Unionist Party
AkeleGuzai Division	Dejach Berhe Asmerom	Anti-Unionist
AkeleGuzai Division	Ato Tewelde Tedla	Unionist Party
AkeleGuzai Division	Fit. Negash Bariaeghzi	Unionist Party
AkeleGuzai Division	Dej. Ghebrezghi Guangul	Anti-Unionist
AkeleGuzai Division	Fit. Saleh Omar	Anti-Unionist
AkeleGuzai Division	Sayid Ahmed Saleh Barole	Anti-Unionist
AkeleGuzai Division	Sayid Sunabara Damana	Anti-Unionist
AkeleGuzai Division	Graz. Abdella Omar	Anti-Unionist
AkeleGuzai Division	Lij. Alemseged Belai	Unionist Party
AkeleGuzai Division	Azmatch Reda Guangul	Unionist Party
Asmara Division	Demsas Woldemikael	Unionist Party
Asmara Division	Ibrahim Ali Bekit	Anti-Unionist
Asmara Division	Solomon Hailemelokot	Unionist Party
Asmara Division	Berhanu Ahmeddin	Anti-Unionist
Asmara Division	Habtesghi Ogbasghi	Unionist Party
Asmara Division	Fessaha Woldemariam	Anti-Unionist
Asmara Division	Keshi Meascio Bein	Unionist Party
Assab Division	Rashid Sirru	
Hamasen Division	Bashai Tekeste Seleba	
Hamasen Division	Bashai Ghebrehiwet Tesfai	Unionist Party
Hamasen Division	Azmatch Hagos Sereke	Unionist Party
Hamasen Division	Ato Berhe Ghebrehiwet	Unionist Party
Hamasen Division	Ato Belai Ghebremariam	Unionist Party
Hamasen Division	Graz. Ghebremariam T	Unionist Party
Keren Division	Sayid Hussein Kafeel	Anti-Unionist
Keren Division	Sayid Ismael Daud	
Keren Division	Sayid Sefaf Hiyabu	Unionist Party
Keren Division	Cavalier Abbe Mohammed	
Keren Division	Ato Abreha Wonderas	Unionist Party
Keren Division	Sheik Hamid Sayid Hamid	
Keren Division	Sayid Yusuf Faki Ali	Anti-Unionist
Keren Division	Sayid Mohammed Ale Abdella	
Keren Division	Sayid Omar Sheikh Mohammed Amir	Anti-Unionist
Keren Division	Sayid Mohammed Sayid M. Hasseno	Anti-Unionist
Keren Division	Haj Mohammed Mussa Mender	Anti-Unionist
Keren Division	Sayid Abdu Sheikh Ali	Anti-Unionist
Keren Division	Sayid Osman Mohammed	Anti-Unionist
Keren Division	Sayid Osman Abdurrahman Sheferai	
Keren Division	Sayid Omar Adem Idris	Anti-Unionist
Keren Division	Sayid Al Hassan Mohammed Akola	
Keren Division	Sayid Hamid Ferej Hamid	
Keren Division	Sayid Adem Suleiman Dighe	
Keren Division	Sayid Mohammed Badumme Kassu	Anti-Unionist
Keren Division	Sayid Faid Tinga Longhi	Anti-Unionist
Keren Division	Sayid Mohammed Arey Agaba	
Massawa Division	Hajj Osman Mohammed Hindi	Anti-Unionist
Massawa Division	Ato Misgun Bokru	Unionist Party
Massawa Sub-Division	Sayid Mohammed Ali Sheikh el Amin	
Massawa Sub-Division	Sheikh Kekkia Pasha	Unionist Party
Massawa Sub-Division	Sayid Mohammed Ali Maliki	
Serae Division	Bashai Berhane Tecle	Unionist Party
Serae Division	Azmatch Fasil Habtu	Unionist Party
Serae Division	Kegnaz Yihdego Ghebrerufael	Unionist Party
Serae Division	Keshi Woldeyohannes Tzadu	Unionist Party
Serae Division	Ato Tesfai Zemikael	
Serae Division	Keshi Dimetros Ghebremariam	Unionist Party
Serae Division	Ato Nega Naizghi	Unionist Party
Serae Division	Ato Ogbe Haile	Unionist Party
Serae Division	Azmatch Woldemikael Beraki	Unionist Party
Serae Division	Graz. Asmerom Woldeghiorghis	Unionist Party
Serae Division	Ato Ghebremikael Derzo	Unionist Party
Serae Division	Graz. Tesfamikael Werke	Unionist Party
Source: Report On Elections For The Second Assembly Of Eritrea

== Aftermath ==
The self-dissolution of the Assembly in 1962 was the pretext for annexation of Eritrea by Imperial Ethiopia.
