= Abiye Abebe =

Ethiopian politician (1917–1974)

- አብይ አበበ
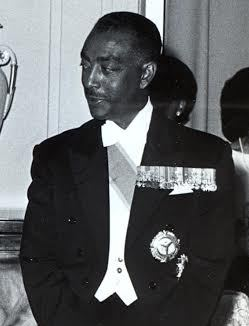
- Abiye in 1967

Minister of Defence
- In office 28 February 1974 – 22 July 1974
- Prime Minister: Endelkachew Makonnen
- Preceded by: Merid Mengesha
- Succeeded by: Aman Andom

President of the Senate
- In office 15 July 1964 – 28 February 1974
- Monarch: Haile Selassie I
- Preceded by: Le'ul Ras Asrate Kassa
- Succeeded by: Legislature abolished

Governor-General of Eritrea Chief Administrator (1960–1962) Chief Executive (1959–1960)
- In office 20 May 1959 – 12 February 1964
- Monarch: Haile Selassie I
- Preceded by: Bitwoded Asfaha Woldemikael as Chief Executive
- Succeeded by: Le'ul Ras Asrate Kassa

Personal details
- Born: 1917 Addis Ababa, Ethiopian Empire
- Died: 23 November 1974 (aged 56–57) Akaki Central Prison, Addis Ababa, Ethiopia
- Spouse(s): Princess Tsehai Haile-Selassie; Woizero Amarech Nasibu
- Parent: Liqa Mequas Abebe Atnaf Seggad (father)

Lij Abiye Abebe (Amharic: አብይ አበበ; 1917 – 23 November 1974) was an Ethiopian politician and son-in-law of Emperor Haile Selassie.

== Biography ==
Son of Liqa Mequas Abebe Atnaf Seggad, Abiye was born 1918 in Addis Ababa as a Lij. He attended the Holeta Military Academy. In the 1940s and 1950s he was Minister of Defence, and later served as Minister of Justice and Minister of the Interior. He chaired the High National Security Commission during the Ethiopian Revolution until his arrest by the Derg on 16 July 1974. Lt. General Abiye was serving as Chief of the General Staff when he was arrested.

According to John Spencer, when Prime Minister Aklilu Habte-Wold sought to resign his post in 1973, he suggested to the Emperor that he be replaced by General Abiye. Other sources indicate that Aklilu Habte-Wold's rival Prince Asrate Kassa was the person who put General Abiye forward as a fellow aristocrat. However Abiye consented to becoming prime minister only if his nomination, and those of his cabinet, were approved by the Ethiopian parliament, a condition Emperor Haile Selassie found unacceptable. As a result, Haile Selassie decided to appoint Endelkachew Makonnen Prime Minister instead. Abiye was one of 60 former government officials executed the night of 22–23 November at Akaki Central Prison by the Derg.

General Abiye as married three times. At Addis Ababa, on 26 April 1942, he married Princess Tsehai of Ethiopia who died in childbirth a year later. After this marriage, Lt. General Abiye Abebe was accorded the dignities and protocol rank of the Emperor's son-in-law, even after he remarried. In 1946, married Woizero Amarech Nasibu, daughter of Nasibu Zeamanuel, with whom he had 4 children Abebe, Mekonnen, Amaha and Solomon, and then in 1970 to Woizero Tsige Aynalem, his widow, with whom he had three children, Phebe, Berkinesh, and Abiye.

== Career history ==
- Brigadier-General (24 April 1942)
- Governor-General of Wollega province (1942–1943)
- Minister for War 1949–1955; Acting (1943–1947)
- Minister of Justice (1958–1961)
- Minister of Interior (1961–1964)
- Ambassador to France (1955–1958)
- Viceroy of Eritrea (1959–1964)
- President of the Ethiopian Senate (1964–1974)
- Minister for Defence and Chief of Staff (28 February 1974 – 22 July 1974)

== Honours ==
=== National ===
- Knight Grand Cross of the Order of the Holy Trinity
- Knight Grand Cross of the Order of Menelik II
- Military Medal of Merit of the Order of St George
- Haile Selassie I Gold Medal
- Patriot Medal & three torches (1944)
- Refugee Medal (1944)
- Jubilee Medal (1955)
- Jubilee Medal (1966)

=== Foreign ===
- Knight Grand Cross of the Order of Orange-Nassau (Kingdom of The Netherlands, 13 November 1953)
- Knight Grand Cross of the Royal Norwegian Order of Saint Olav (Kingdom of Norway, January 1956)
- Knight Grand Cross of the Order of Legion of Honour (French Republic)
- Grand Cordon of the Supreme Order of the Renaissance (Kingdom of Jordan)
- Knight Grand Cross of the Royal Order of Sahametrei (Kingdom of Cambodia, 4 January 1968)
- Honorary Knight Commander of the Order of the British Empire (United Kingdom, 1965)
- British Star (United Kingdom, 1939–1945)
- Africa Star (United Kingdom, 1940–1943)
- British War Medal (United Kingdom, 1939–1945)
- National Order of Merit (France)
