= Emblem of Eritrea =

Coat of arms of the State of Eritrea

- Armiger: State of Eritrea
- Adopted: 24 May 1993
- Shield: Argent, a base of sand or, overall a camel of the same
- Supporters: An olive wreath
- Motto: ሃገረ ኤርትራ (Tigrinya) دولة إرتريا (Arabic) ("The State of Eritrea")

The Emblem of Eritrea was adopted on 24 May 1993 on the occasion of Eritrea's declaration of independence from Ethiopia. The national emblem mainly depicts a camel surrounded by an olive wreath.

== Present emblem ==
The modern emblem of Eritrea was adopted 24 May 1993, the date of the declaration of independence from Ethiopia. It shows a scene of a dromedary camel in the desert, which is surrounded by an olive wreath. The camel was the beast of burden used during the war of independence from Ethiopia to transport supplies and goods, and was seen as being instrumental to the movement's success by Eritrean nationalists. The name of the country appears on a scroll towards the bottom of the emblem threefold, in Tigrinya, English and Arabic, three widely spoken languages in the country.

== History ==
Eritrea was first assigned a coat of arms in 1919, when it was a colony of the Kingdom of Italy. The shield was parted in half horizontally, with the top portion displaying a red lion charged on his breast with a white star and the bottom half divided into six wavy bars alternating blue and white. The red lion represents the Italian Kingdom, lions alluding to the Italian King who used the beasts as supporters and red being a common colour associated with Italy and also used by the ruling House of Savoy. The star has long been a symbol of the Italian people, known as the Stellone d'Italia, which protects and guards the nation. The bottom portion displaying blue and white wavy bars is a common heraldic depiction representing water, and alludes to the origins of the colony's name. Eritrea is derived from the Latin Erythræa, the name applied to the Red Sea in antiquity; the colony was named so for its coastline along that body of water.

During the Fascist regime of Italy, which began in 1924, the arms were augmented with symbols of the new government: a red chief was added in 1936, which was charged with fasces and laurel wreath. Eritrea was then absorbed into the colony of Italian East Africa in 1936, reducing it to a province of the new and larger colony. The arms of Eritrea made up one field in the arms of Italian East Africa, but without the chief added in 1936. In 1941, when the province was conquered and placed under British administration, the fascist chief was removed and the original arms were again employed. In 1951, the process of annexation by Ethiopia began, and the arms continued in use until the following year.

During the annexation period, from 1952 to 1962, an emblem was adopted that consisted of a vertical olive branch encircled by an olive wreath. This emblem is used still on the nation's flag.

=== Historical coats of arms ===
Coat of Arms of the Ottoman Empire from 1846 to 1882.

Coat of Arms of the Ottoman Empire from 17 April to 5 July 1882.

Coat of arms of the Egypt Eyalet from 1854 to 1867.

Coat of arms of The Khedivate of Egypt from 1867 to 1882.

Coat of arms of The Kingdom of Italy from 1882 to 1890.

Coat of arms of The Kingdom of Italy from 1890 to 1929.

Coat of arms of The Kingdom of Italy from 1929 to 1941.

The heraldic arms of the Italian colony of Eritrea from 1919 to 1936.

Coat of arms of Italian East Africa from 1938 to 1941.

The coat of arms of colonial and provincial Eritrea from 1936 to 1941.

Coat of arms of United Kingdom from 1941 to 1952.

Coat of arms of the Kingdom of Egypt from 1941 to 1952.

Emblem of The Anglo-Egyptian Sudan from 1941 to 1952.

The heraldic device of the British administration of Eritrea from 1941 to 1952.

Coat of arms of The Ethiopian Empire (Under Haile Selassie) from 1952 to 1975.

The emblem of Eritrea during federation with Ethiopia from 1952 to 1962.

Emblem of The Provisional Military Government of Socialist Ethiopia from 1975 to 1987.

Emblem of The People's Democratic Republic of Ethiopia from 1987 to 1991.

Emblem of The Transitional Government of Ethiopia from 1991 to 1993.

== See also ==
- Armorial of Africa
- Flag of Eritrea
