= Unionist Party (Eritrea) =

Eritrean political party, 1941–1962

Unionist Party ማሕበር ፍቕሪ ሃገር ኢትዮጵያ ምስ ኤርትራ ሓንቲ ኢትዮጵያ
- Abbreviation: UP
- Leader: Tedla Bairu (Secretary General); Bayyana Baraki (President)
- Founded: May 5, 1941
- Dissolved: 1962
- Headquarters: Asmara, Eritrea
- Ideology: Ethiopian nationalism

The Unionist Party (also known as Mahber Fikri Hager, Tigrinya: ማሕበር ፍቕሪ ሃገር, meaning "Society for the Love of the Country"), formally registered as the Union of Eritrea and Ethiopia (ማሕበር ፍቕሪ ሃገር ኢትዮጵያ ምስ ኤርትራ ሓንቲ ኢትዮጵያ, Maòbär féqri hagär, Ityopya més Erétra, hanti Ityopya), was an Eritrean political party that advocated the unconditional union of Eritrea with Ethiopia. Founded on 5 May 1941, it was the dominant political force in Eritrea during the late 1940s and the federation period, eventually collapsing following Ethiopia's annexation of Eritrea in 1962.

== History ==
=== Founding ===
The Unionist Party was established in Asmara on 5 May 1941, the same day as the victorious return of Emperor Haile Selassie to Addis Ababa following five years of exile in Great Britain during the Italian occupation. While the Emperor raised the Ethiopian flag in Addis Ababa, the people of Asmara held a demonstration calling for the unification of Eritrea with Ethiopia. On that same day, the leaders of the conference announced the formation of the Unionist Party.

Both the demonstration and the formation of the party were of a local nature, as their occurrence appears not to have been reported to London at the time. The initial inspiration for the choice of that particular date has been traced by the party's leaders to the messages contained in British and Ethiopian propaganda pamphlets distributed widely among Eritreans between October 1940 and April 1941.

The party was originally known informally as the Mahber Fikri Hager (Association for Love of Country) and was not officially registered until 1 January 1947, when it was formally registered in Asmara as the Unionist Party. The name Unionist Party was given to it by the British Military Administration (Eritrea); its members continued to call it Mahber Fikri Hager throughout the period.

=== Leadership and structure ===
During the first six years of its existence, the party was led by Gebremeskel Weldu, who was described as competent and sensitive to the contradictions between Eritrean adherents of the party and the Ethiopian state. When the party was formally registered in 1947, Bayyana Baraki became President and Tedla Bairu served as Secretary General.

The party was led by Abbuna Marcos, the head of the Ethiopian Orthodox Church in Eritrea. Its Central Committee was based in Asmara, with regional committees in major highland provincial towns. The first president of the party was a devout Catholic; his successor, Tedla Bairu, who also served as the first president of Eritrea from 1952 to 1955, was a devout Evangelist. The party claimed to have 729,193 members in Eritrea and some 195,000 members in Ethiopia, though western officials disputed both figures and maintained that actual membership was considerably lower.

The party formed a youth section called Andinnet, established on 14 September 1945 as the Four Powers began their first discussions on the disposal of Italian colonies. Known for its radical and uncompromising position on unconditional union, the youth section was led by members elected to serve one year terms. A women's branch was also established, according to later documentation, in 1948–49.

=== Religious character ===
The Unionist Party was deeply imbued with religious values. Its leaders came predominantly from Catholic and Evangelical backgrounds. The Ethiopian Orthodox Church was from the outset fully associated with the objectives of the party, and by 1942 every village church had in practice become a centre of Ethiopian nationalism. The leaders of the Muslim religious and commercial community were also active members of the party in its early years. Out of 44 members of the Executive Committee, no fewer than 19 were Muslims.

The Catholic church of the Ethiopian rite, embracing Eritrean Catholics, was fully committed to the cause of unconditional union with Ethiopia. Throughout the colonial period, many adherents of the Swedish Evangelical Mission (active in Eritrea since 1866) had considered themselves as Ethiopians, a position that created tensions with Italian authorities in Asmara. The most notable writers for the party's publications were Dr. Abba Hailu Gebreyesus and Abba Yacob Gebreyesus, whose knowledge of Tigrinya language and history was extensive.

=== Relations with the British Military Administration ===
The BMA resented the presence of the Unionist Party. The BMA's treatment of Eritrea and its subjects as belonging to Italy complicated relations between the two. Very few British officers expected that they would be challenged by African colonial subjects, and the BMA did not believe that Eritrea was culturally homogeneous. The movement that the British assisted in its inception was the Separatist Movement, later known as the Party of Eritrea for Eritreans or the Liberal Progressive Party, which aligned with parameters set out by chief administrator Brigadier Stephen Longrigg.

Relations between the BMA and the UP deteriorated sharply following events in July and August 1946. On 28 July 1946, during a demonstration organized by the UP, BMA authorities arrested the ringleaders. On 30 July, supporters of the arrested leaders gathered to demand their release and were fired upon by the Sudanese Defence Force, a contingent that had accompanied the British since 1940–41. Four Eritreans were killed. Then on 28 August 1946, three Sudanese soldiers were assaulted and one was stoned to death in an incident in the Eritrean quarters of Asmara. A fully armed company of about 70 Sudanese Defence Force soldiers subsequently marched into the streets of the Eritrean quarters and shot indiscriminately, leaving 46 killed and 60 wounded. The BMA was accused of giving the Sudanese Defence Force a free hand in settling accounts with the Eritreans.

Political violence in Asmara continued into 1950 while the UN was still deciding Eritrea's status. In July of that year a bomb was left at the home of Dejazmach Araya Wassie, a senior UP figure, in the mixed European and native quarter of Asmara. He was in Addis Ababa at the time and there were no casualties. That same week a member of the pro-independence bloc was shot dead nearby. The Italo-Eritrean Association, representing the independence movement, filed a protest with the United Nations over the incidents.

=== Four Powers Commission and UN resolution ===
The arrival of the Four Powers Commission of Inquiry (FPC) in Eritrea in November 1947 signalled a climax to political agitation in which the UP and the Muslim League were the two main contestants. After surveying communities throughout Eritrea from 12 November 1947 to 3 January 1948, the Commission reported that 48.8 percent of those surveyed supported the UP's annexation agenda. Percentages for the other parties were 30.9 percent (Muslim League), 10.7 percent (Pro-Italy Party), and 9.3 percent (Liberal Progressive Party).

The Four Power Commission failed to agree upon a disposal strategy and on 15 September 1948 turned the Eritrean question over to the United Nations. On 2 December 1950, the UN voted to federate Eritrea and Ethiopia rather than grant either independence or full annexation.

During the same period, the UP mounted an active lobbying campaign outside Eritrea. In October 1949, as the UN debated the territory's future, a seven-man party delegation led by Dejazmach Belena traveled to Cairo to meet with King Farouk and press the case for unconditional annexation. A delegation spokesman claimed they represented a majority of Eritreans, both Christians and Muslims, and warned that prolonged uncertainty would produce economic collapse and violence in Eritrea.

=== Federation period ===
In March 1952, the UP won 32 of 68 seats in the Eritrean Assembly and further consolidated its position by forming an alliance with the Muslim League of the Western Province.

From the outset, the UP leadership viewed the federal arrangement as an unwelcome imposition. According to historian Tekeste Negash, the party's members considered the federation either "a naive foreign imposition or an act of conspiracy hatched by Italy behind closed doors." They found several features of the arrangement offensive: the chief executive was elected rather than appointed by the Emperor; the term "government of Eritrea" appeared to place Eritrea and Ethiopia on an equal footing, when the UP preferred the term "administration of Eritrea"; and the constitutional division of powers among the executive, judicial, and legislative branches seemed entirely foreign to Eritrean political tradition. Already in the first years of the federation, former members of the UP, now in government positions, were working to undermine it and call for its dissolution rather than make it function.

==== Under Chief Executive Tedla Bairu, 1952–1955 ====
Tedla Bairu, the president of the Unionist Party, became the first Chief Executive of the Eritrean government when the federation came into force in September 1952. The British financial advisor Wilson-Heathcote, who resigned from his post in March 1953 rather than share responsibility for what he called the "impending financial collapse," offered a blunt assessment of the Chief Executive's conduct. He concluded that Tedla Bairu was "deliberately conducting the affairs of his country so that its complete amalgamation with Ethiopia will be an accomplished fact in a short time."

The British financial advisor documented a series of specific actions that had this effect. The cabinet formed in July 1952 was never once convened, concentrating executive power entirely in Tedla Bairu's hands. He suppressed the only independent newspaper in Eritrea on what the advisor called "specious excuses," blocking critical reporting. He prevented the Auditor-General's reports from reaching the Eritrean Assembly, keeping elected representatives unaware of the government's finances. He also vetoed the seating of candidates returned in by-elections who were politically opposed to him.

Tedla Bairu repeatedly suspended sessions of the Eritrean Assembly rather than allow members to debate Ethiopian interference in Eritrean affairs or raise the issue of the ML newspaper being prosecuted in a federal court. In August 1954 alone he suspended the assembly to prevent discussion of those very proceedings. The British Consulate-General concluded that Tedla Bairu "preferred to function as the errand boy of the Emperor's representative rather than as an executive of the Eritrean cabinet and of the assembly that elected him."

Tedla Bairu also moved against his main political rival. In late 1953 he arrested Abraha Tessema, the leading federalist contender for the chief executiveship, on charges the Commissioner of Police privately concluded were fabricated. Despite advice from his own advisors, Tedla Bairu signed a decree for Abraha Tessema's indefinite imprisonment and used the police to intimidate Tessema's lawyers and family. The British judges of the Eritrean Supreme Court declared the detention illegal and ordered his release, after which Tedla Bairu attempted to force their resignation, a move the Emperor's own representative privately acknowledged was unconstitutional.

By September 1954, on the second anniversary of the federation, Tedla Bairu stated publicly that if the people were to choose complete union with Ethiopia over federation, "my joy would be great." The following year pressure from the Eritrean Assembly, the Emperor's representative, and the Unionist Party itself combined to force his resignation, which he announced in July 1955 on grounds of health.

==== Under Chief Executive Asfaha Woldemikael, 1955–1962 ====
On 8 August 1955, the Eritrean Assembly elected Asfaha Woldemikael as Chief Executive. Prior to this election, Asfaha had served as vice-representative of the Emperor in Eritrea, the second-highest office under the Emperor's Representative. He never formally resigned from that federal post after assuming the Eritrean one, with the result that by the late 1950s he was spending two or three mornings each week at the imperial palace presiding over conferences of Ethiopian officials. The British Consul-General in Asmara wrote that "when the chief executive elected by the Eritrean Assembly is also the principal agent in Eritrea of the Emperor, the Eritrean Constitution becomes something of a farce."

Asfaha quickly filled his cabinet with Unionists. The Department of the Interior, which controlled the police and the provincial bureaucracy, went to Araya Wassie, whom British observers identified as one of the most committed annexationists within the UP. The post of Commissioner of Police went to Tedla Ogbit, a UP loyalist whose earlier dismissal by Tedla Bairu had been challenged all the way to the imperial palace on the grounds that it was punishment for his unionist views.

In November 1955, during celebrations for the Emperor's silver jubilee, the acting Chief Executive Araya Wassie removed the Eritrean flag from the streets of Asmara, leaving only the Ethiopian flag. The Moslem League responded immediately with a protest letter threatening a public demonstration, and the government backed down and rehoisted the Eritrean flag within the same day. Nearly three years would pass before the Eritrean government succeeded in removing the flag permanently.

The 1956 elections to the second Eritrean Assembly were conducted under conditions that British observers, including the clerk of the assembly Fergus McCleary, described as designed to eliminate opposition. Police Commissioner Tedla Ogbit's forces harassed anti-Unionist candidates, and observers reported that in most districts only one pro-government candidate was permitted to run. One opposition candidate, Muhammed Omar Akito, received a bomb through his living room window as an attempt to drive him out of the race. He stood anyway, won his district, and the assembly still refused to seat him, requiring him to go to the Eritrean Supreme Court, which ultimately validated his election. The British Consul-General noted that "at this rate of progress it should not be very long before the Eritrean Assembly votes for complete union with Ethiopia."

In 1958, following the arrest and ten-year imprisonment of Mohamed Omar Kadi, the leading Moslem League federalist, for a radio interview he gave in Cairo describing Ethiopia as an imperialist power, the Eritrean government moved to remove the Eritrean flag for good. The Eritrean Flag, Seal and Arms (Amendment) Act of 1958 was rushed through the assembly without giving Muslim deputies any time to prepare or organize opposition. From that point forward, only the Ethiopian flag flew officially in Eritrea.

Two further steps in 1959 eroded what remained of Eritrea's distinct legal and fiscal identity. The Penal Code (Extension) Act repealed the Italian penal code that had been in force throughout the colonial period and replaced it with the newly promulgated Ethiopian Imperial Penal Code. The two governments also integrated their taxation systems. Commenting on this last step in an October 1958 despatch, the British Consul noted that the constitutional line between the competencies of the Ethiopian and Eritrean governments, so carefully drawn by the UN Commissioner, was being systematically disregarded.

In May 1960, the Eritrean Assembly passed a constitutional amendment, by a vote of 43 to none, replacing the term "Eritrean government" with "Eritrean administration" and renaming the office of Chief Executive as Chief Administrator. The official letterhead was subsequently changed to read "Eritrean administration under Haile Sellassie, Emperor of Ethiopia." The Eritrean Assembly had also consistently refused in both the 1956 and 1960 electoral cycles to replace the 1951 indirect election system with direct elections, a reform that the Ethiopian government itself had already implemented. British observers believed assembly members calculated that indirect elections were easier to control and had no interest in changing them.

=== Dissolution ===
On 14 November 1962, the Eritrean Assembly voted unanimously to dissolve the federation and unite Eritrea with the Ethiopian Empire. In announcing the dissolution, Chief Executive Asfaha Woldemikael declared that "the reunion is a recognition of our being Ethiopians" and added that "the word federation did not even exist in our language." The following day, Ethiopia annexed Eritrea and named Abiy Abbaba as the province's Governor General.

Negash argues that responsibility for the dissolution lay substantially with the UP-dominated Eritrean government rather than with Ethiopia alone. He states that "although the Ethiopian government might have been equally interested in abolishing [the federation], it is inconceivable that this would have succeeded without the full support of the UP and the Eritrean government." Shortly after the annexation, the Unionist Party collapsed as Addis Ababa bought off its officials with pensions or sinecures. Although Tedla Bairu later joined the ELF (Jebha), and started fighting against Ethiopia for Eritrean Liberation. After soon realizing unification wouldn't truly work out.

== See also ==
- Ethiopian-Eritrean Federation
- British Military Administration (Eritrea)
- Tedla Bairu
