= Andargachew Messai =

Ethiopian diplomat

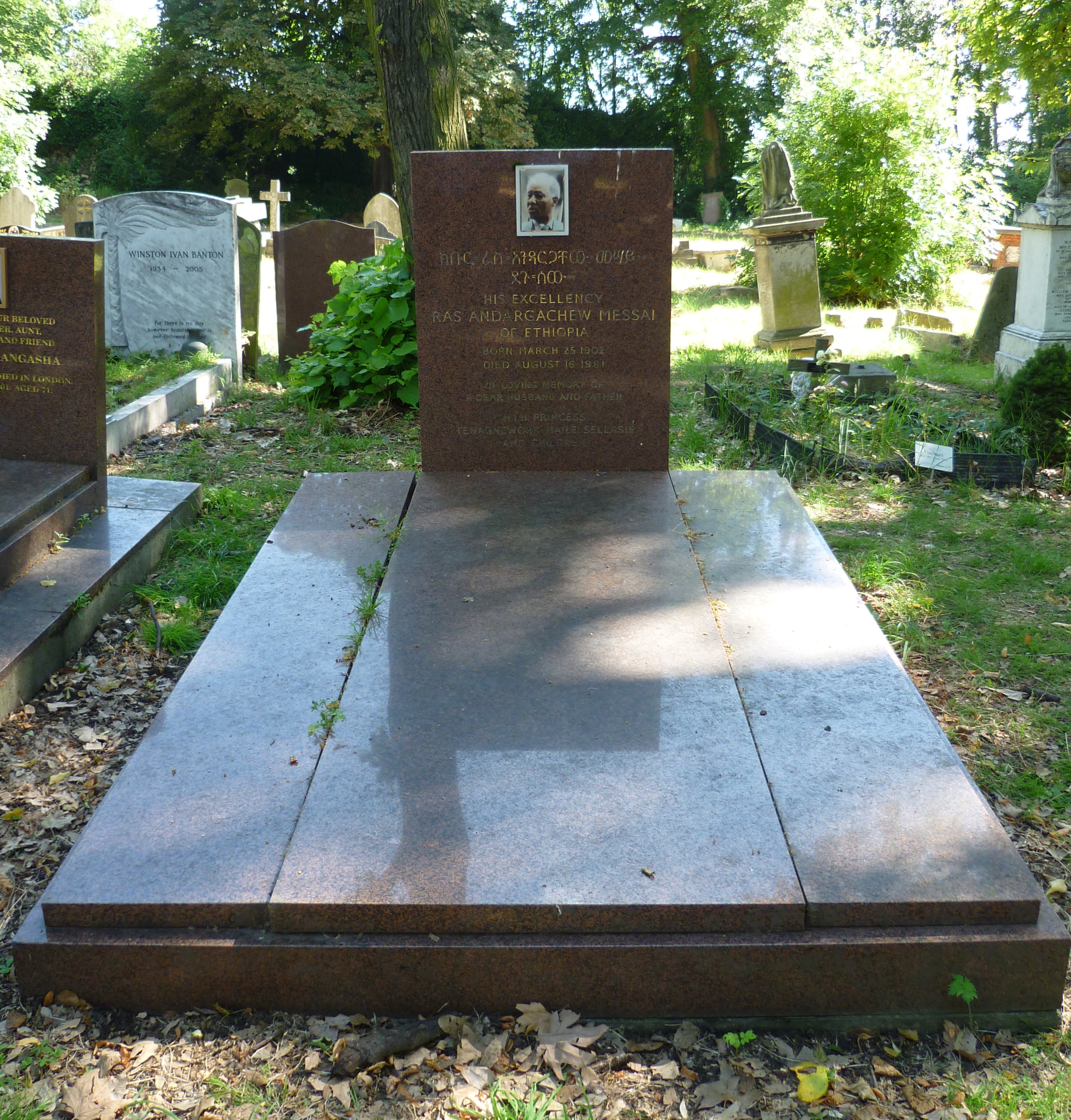
The grave of Andargachew Messai at Kensal Green Cemetery (July 2015)

Andargachew Messai (25 March 1902 – 16 August 1981) was an Ethiopian diplomat and the husband of Princess Tenagnework Haile Selassie of Ethiopia, the eldest child of Emperor Haile Selassie and Empress Menen Asfaw. He was born in the historical province of Shewa.

Messai died following a long illness in London, United Kingdom. He is buried at Kensal Green Cemetery.
