= Flag of Eritrea =

Eritrea
- Use: National flag and ensign
- Proportion: 1:2
- Adopted: 5 December 1995; 30 years ago (standard version)
- Design: A red isosceles triangle based on the hoist-side pointed towards the fly-side divided into two right triangles where the upper triangle is green and the lower triangle is blue with the Emblem of Eritrea from 1952 to 1995 in yellow, in other words, a vertical olive branch encircled by an olive wreath, centered on the hoist side of the triangle.

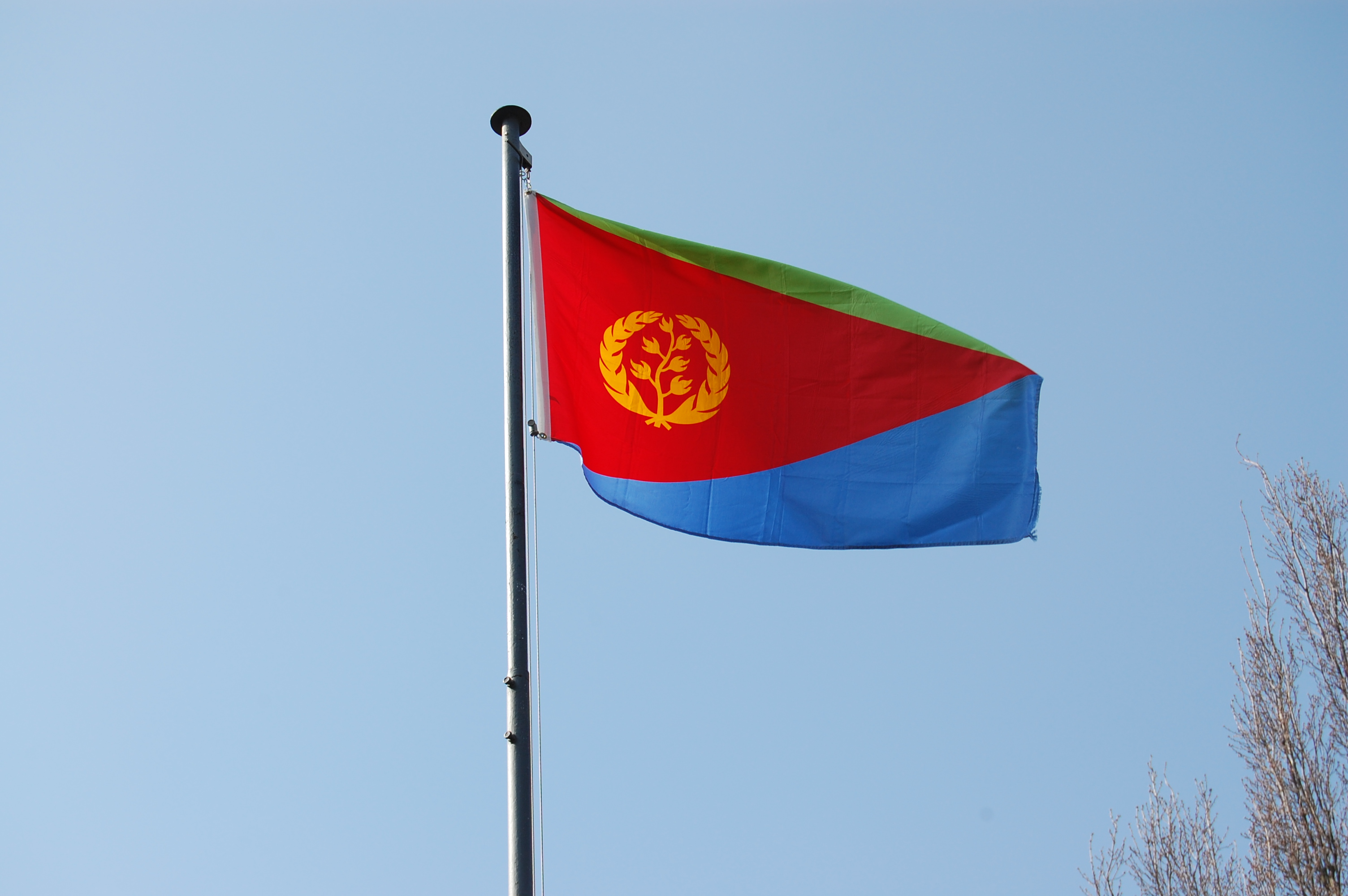
Flag of Eritrea at the Eritrean Embassy in Berlin

The flag of Eritrea (Tigrinya: ሃገራዊት ባንዴራ ኤርትራ, Arabic: علم إريتريا الوطني) is the national flag of the State of Eritrea. It was adopted on 5 December 1995. The flag combines the basic layout and colors from the flag of the Eritrean People's Liberation Front with an emblem of a wreath and an upright olive branch derived from the Eritrean flag from 1952 to 1962.

The green color in the flag stands for the agriculture and livestock of the country, while the blue represents the bounty of the sea. The red stands for the bloodshed in the struggle for Eritrean independence, with the 30 leaves in the wreath representing the thirty years spent in the struggle for independence.

== History and symbolism ==
Eritrea and Ethiopia were both occupied by the Italians between 1935 and 1941. After Italy's defeat in the East African Campaign, Ethiopia reverted to its pre-Italian feudal monarchy while Eritrea was handed over to British rule under a mandate by the United Nations in 1949. The rise of Arab nationalism during the 1940s prompted the Muslim segment of Eritrea to seek independence from British governance. Simultaneously, Ethiopia aimed to assert control over the Eritrean territory, asserting it as a reclaimed province. Various officials suggested a division of Eritrea: the Christian region to be incorporated into Ethiopia, and the Muslim area into Sudan. Following global deliberations and the involvement of Allied Powers, the United Nations issued a resolution, wherein Britain agreed to establish an autonomous Eritrea in partnership with Ethiopia in 1950.

On September 15, 1952, Eritrea became independent from British rule and was made an autonomous part of Ethiopia. That same year, through their elected representatives, Eritreans settled on the blue flag as their common symbol. The flag was created and designed by Degiat Beyene Zahilay, who was born in Tekonda, Akele Guzay, Eritrea. The "Blue Flag" is passionately referred to as "Khedra" in Tigre and "Awlie" in Tigrinya. The flag displayed three olive branches on a blue background: two branches with eleven leaves each, hugging a third branch that carries twelve leaves.

Previously, the unionists had rejected independence and had always yearned to be ruled by Haile Selassie, but throughout the federal period, they continued identifying themselves with the Ethiopian flag, and sabotaging the federal arrangement. Soon, Emperor Haile Selassie began to openly violate and abolish the federal arrangement; he dissolved the Eritrean parliament and outlawed the Eritrean flag which he lowered and hoisted the Ethiopian flag in its place, practically occupying Eritrea militarily. The lowering of the flag sparked the lengthy armed struggle by Eritreans for self-determination and the Eritrean flag continued to be a crucial symbol of Eritrean nationalism.

The propaganda of the Unionist Party aggressively targeted the blue flag. To them, it was the "flag of the United Nations." At the same time, the Ethiopian Flag was promoted as one belonging to Janhoi, Haile Selassie, the elect of God. While the Ethiopian flag was given a divine value, the Eritrean flag was portrayed as one belonging to the shifta and Arab sellouts who betrayed their "Mother Ethiopia," and they worked hard to separate the child (Eritrea) from its mother (Ethiopia). At later stages, it became difficult for some who had been raised on this propaganda to accept the blue flag. The blue Eritrean flag had been decided upon and approved by the founding fathers. Furthermore, all Eritrean parties that represented the entire social and political forces of the country, including the pan-Ethiopianist Union party, participated in the negotiations and accepted the flag as a unifying symbol of Eritrea.

On September 1, 1961, Hamid Idris Awate brought back the blue flag suppressed by Haile Selassie. Eritrean nationalists saw it as representing their dreams and as the magnet that pulled all Eritreans together.

After civil war broke out in Eritrea in 1961, Ethiopian emperor Haile Selassie banned the Eritrean flag, coat of arms, and all other government seals from being displayed in public places. He annexed Eritrea in 1962 with the approval of the United Nations.

The blue and green Eritrean flag, however, continued to be in use as the "flag of liberation", by the Eritrean Liberation Front (ELF). When the EPLF officially came to being, it proposed its own flag during the front's First Organizational Congress in 1977.

The current flag of Eritrea bears resemblance to the party's official flag. The flag had three triangles: red, blue, and green. The yellow star in the red triangle symbolized the country's rich mineral resources, with the five points representing unity, liberation, justice, democracy, and progress. After Eritrea was proclaimed an independent nation, the flag was modified and its first official hoisting was performed on May 24, 1993. In the red triangle, a gold wreath symbol with 14 leaves on each side, derived from the 1952 flag, replaced the gold star of the Eritrean People's Liberation Front's flag. In 1995 the number of leaves in the wreath were standardized; the 30 leaves symbolise the number of years spent in civil war before achieving independence. The flag's length to breadth ratio was changed from 2:3 to 1:2.

The official currency of Eritrea's Nakfa coins issued in 1997 featured six native animals; on the reverse the coins showed a group of Eritrean People's Liberation Front's fighters raising the national flag and the slogan "Liberty, Equality and Justice" in English language.

== Description ==
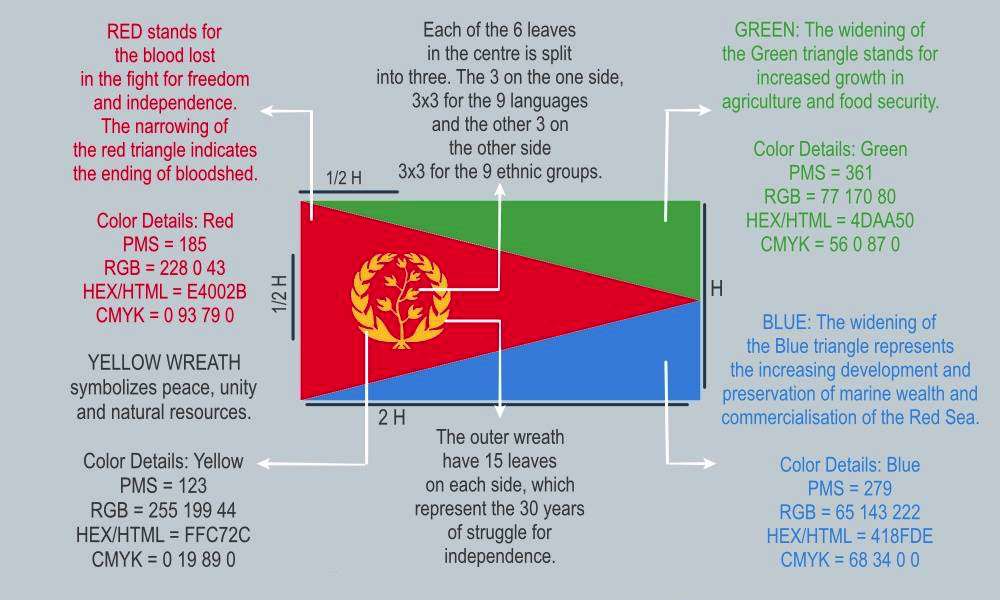
Flag of Eritrea Specifications

The flag of Eritrea is dominated by a red isosceles triangle based on the hoist-side pointed toward the fly-side and then divided into two right triangles. The upper triangle is green and the lower triangle is blue with a yellow vertical olive branch encircled by an olive wreath centered on the hoist side of the triangle. The shape of the red triangle broadly mimics the shape of the country. The green stands for the agriculture and livestock of the country, blue for the bounty of the sea, and red for the bloodshed in the struggle for independence with the 30 leaves in the wreath corresponding to the thirty years spent in the struggle. The flag has proportions of 1:2.

Color scheme	Blue	Red	Yellow	Green
Pantone	279 C	185 C	123 C	2422 C
CMYK	63-32-0-14	0-91-72-8	0-20-84-2	63-0-53-33
HEX	#3C8BDC	#EB0433	#FBC724	#0BAC24
RGB	60-139-220	235-4-51	251-199-36	11-172-36

== Historical flags ==
Flag from 1952 to 1962 (2:3 ratio)

Flag from 1993 to 1995 (2:3 ratio)

Standard of the president of state (1:2 ratio)

Flag of the EPLF

Flag since 1995 (1:2 ratio)

== Sources ==
- Connell, Dan; Killion, Tom (2010). Historical Dictionary of Eritrea. Scarecrow Press. ISBN 978-0-8108-7505-0.
- Minahan, James (2013). Miniature Empires: A Historical Dictionary of the Newly Independent States. Routledge. ISBN 978-1-135-94010-2.
- Murtaza, Niaz (1998). The Pillage of Sustainablility in Eritrea, 1600s–1990s: Rural Communities and the Creeping Shadows of Hegemony. Greenwood Publishing Group. ISBN 978-0-313-30633-4.
