= British Military Administration (Eritrea) =

1941–1952 British control of Italian Eritrea

British Military Administration in Eritrea
- 1941–1952
- Flag
- Capital: Asmara
- Government: Military administration
- Chief Administrator
  - 1941–1943: William Scupham
  - 1943–1948: Denis Wickham
  - 1948: Eric de Candole
  - 1948–1950: Geoffrey Gamble
- History
  - Established: 25 February 1941
  - Federation of Ethiopia and Eritrea: 15 September 1952
- Currency: East African shilling
Preceded by	Succeeded by
Italian East Africa	Federation of Ethiopia and Eritrea

The British Military Administration in Eritrea was established following the Allied victory over Italy at the Battle of Keren in 1941. From 1941 to 1950, the political direction of Eritrea remained uncertain until the U.N. commission reached its compromise solution. With no clear consensus among the Allies on the Italian colony’s post‑war status, Britain governed the territory under military administration until formally relinquishing control only in 1950.

During all of this period of British control, authorities undertook extensive dismantling of Italian‑built infrastructure as war reparations, while grappling with competing political visions for Eritrea’s future: proposals to partition it along religious lines, Soviet-backed trusteeship ideas, and Arab appeals for an independent state.

== History ==
British forces defeated the Italian army in Eritrea in 1941 at the Battle of Keren and placed the colony under British military administration until Allied forces could determine its fate. Several Italian-built infrastructure projects and industries were dismantled and removed to Kenya as war reparations. In the absence of agreement amongst the Allies concerning the status of Eritrea, the British military administration continued for the remainder of World War II until 1950.

When the administration became a civil one, in 1950, it was regarded as a form of trusteeship on behalf of the United Nations pending further decisions as to its future. The head had the title of Chief Administrator. He had a civilian staff, but was supported by elements of the British army, including battalions of the Royal Berkshire Regiment and the South Wales Borderers, a small RAF contingent and military support services, including a company of the Royal Army Service Corps. There was, of course, an ex-pat. amateur dramatic society as was so often the case throughout much of the twentieth century. 2/Lt D J Day, RASC, later Desmond Day OBE, recalls the South Wales Borderers being noted for its very lively Christmas pantomime.

During the immediate postwar years, the British proposed that Eritrea be divided along religious lines, with the Muslim population joining Sudan and the Christians' Ethiopia. The Soviet Union, anticipating an Italian Communist Party victory in the Italian polls, initially supported returning Eritrea to Italy under trusteeship or as a colony. Soviet diplomats, led by Maxim Litvinov and backed by Ivan Maisky and Vyacheslav Molotov, even attempted to have Eritrea become a trustee of the Soviet Union itself.

Arab states, seeing Eritrea and its large Muslim population as an extension of the Arab world, sought the establishment of an independent state. There are only two main Christian-Muslim conflicts reported in Asmara, Eritrea (the Ethiopians supported by the Unionist Party played a big role in it), one was in 1946 where Sudanese Defence Forces were involved, and the other was in February 1950. This note is about that of 1950.

The UN Commission (UNC) arrived in Eritrea on 9 February and began its months-long inquiry 5 days later. Unionist Shifta activities supported by Ethiopia increased after its arrival, they became daring, better planned, better coordinated and innovative. The main target of the shifta was to disrupt the free movement of the UNC in areas controlled by the independence bloc supporters. The shifta attempted to prevent the rural population that supported independence from having an audience with the UNC. They targeted transportation and communication systems. Telephone lines connecting Asmara with major cities of the predominantly areas pro-independence areas of the western lowlands and Masswa were continuously cut.

An active Muslim League local leader, from Mai Derese, Bashai Nessredin Saeed was killed by the Unionist Shifta while praying, on 20 February. According to an account of the incident written by Mufti Sheikh Ibrahim Al Mukhtar, at 07:30 in the evening of a Monday that date 5 shifta came and fired several bullets at him while he was praying. The reason for the killing was that they had asked him to abandon the Muslim League and join the Unionist Party (UP), but he refused. The killing sparked an outrage among Muslims in Asmara. A well organised funeral procession was arranged and attended by youth and Muslim dignitaries. The procession passed through three main streets before they reached the street where the UP Office was located. According to the Mufti, then the UP members started first to throw stones at the procession which was followed by three grenades and then chaos followed. There was open confrontation between both sides and many were killed and injured from both sides. The police intervened by firing live ammunition, but the confrontations continued. Despite all this, the procession continued to the cemetery where the body was buried. The riots then spread to other areas and took a dangerous sectarian form. Many properties were also looted and burned. On Wednesday, the British Military Administration (BMA) declared a curfew, but the riots continued.

On Thursday, the BMA administrator called for a meeting that included the Mufti and Abuna Marcos and asked them to calm the people and ask for reconciliation and both agreed. The wise men from both sides accepted the call, but the looting of properties of Muslim merchants continued for three more days before the riots came to an end.

On Saturday 25 February, the Copts met at the main church and Muslims at the grand mosque and discussed ways to end the violence. Both sides agreed to take an oath to prevent violence against each other. Each side appointed a four-member committee to oversee the agreements. Later 31 members from each side took an oath in front of the eight-member committee. To prevent further violence in other areas, the committee of both sides decided to visit the Muslim and Christian cemeteries and laid flowers on the graveyards of the victims of both sides. More than 62 persons were killed and more than 180 were injured and the damage on the properties was huge. This way the riots, which the Ethiopian Liaison Officer played a big role to ignite, was brought to an end by the wise religious leaders and elders of both sides.

Ethiopian ambition in the Horn was apparent in the expansionist ambition of its monarch when Haile Selassie claimed Italian Somaliland and Eritrea. He made this claim in a letter to Franklin D. Roosevelt, at the Paris Peace Conference and at the First Session of the United Nations. In the United Nations the debate over the fate of the former Italian colonies continued. The British and Americans preferred to cede Eritrea to the Ethiopians if possible as a reward for their support during World War II. "The United States and the United Kingdom have (similarly) agreed to support the cession to Ethiopia of all of Eritrea except the Western province. The United States has given assurances to Ethiopia in this regard." The Independence Bloc of Eritrean parties consistently requested from the UN General Assembly that a referendum be held immediately to settle the Eritrean question of sovereignty.
