= Tedla Bairu =

Chief Executive of Eritrea

Tedla Bairu (1914–1981) was an Eritrean political figure. He was the last independent head of state of Eritrea in 1952. He was then the first Chief Executive of Eritrea from 1952 in federation with Ethiopia, until he resigned in 1955.

After Emperor Haile Selassie forced his resignation, he was appointed as ambassador to Sweden from Ethiopia, and in 1967 he defected to the Eritrean Liberation Front.
