= Legesse Tefera =

Ethiopian fighter pilot (1942–2016)

- Born: 26 August 1942; Addis Ababa, Ethiopian Empire
- Died: 5 October 2016 (aged 73); Washington, D.C., U.S.
- Military career
- Allegiance: Ethiopian Empire (1961–1974); Derg (1974–1991)
- Branch: Ethiopian Air Force
- Service years: 1961–1991
- Rank: Brigadier General
- Battles and wars: Ogaden War (POW)

Brigadier General Legesse Tefera (Amharic: ለገሠ ተፈራ; 26 August 1942 – 5 October 2016), was an Ethiopian Air Force (EtAF) officer and a fighter ace credited with 6 aerial victories in the F-5 during the Ogaden War.

== Early life and career ==
Legesse was born to Tefera Weldeselassie and Tenagne Gebrewelde on 26 August 1942 in Addis Ababa. Legesse joined the Ethiopian Army in 1961 and attained the rank of second lieutenant, after graduating from the Harar Military Academy. He then passed an exam that allowed him to became a fighter pilot in the Ethiopian Air Force (EtAF) in 1967. By July 1977, Legesse Tefera was a member of the 9th Squadron stationed in Debre Zeit which known to have had a total of eighteen aircraft and fifteen pilots, majority of whom were trained in the United States.

== Ogaden War ==
Legesse's first engagement occurred on 25 July 1977 in Gode. With Bacha Hunde and Afework Kidanu as his wingmen, Legesse approached a Somali formation consisting of four MiG-21MF led by CO Hargeisa AB Colonel Musa. When the Somalis saw Legesse's F-5 approach them, Musa and his wingman separated, and both performed a 180 degree turn, with one turning left and the other turning right, but then the two Somalis subsequently collided into each other upon completing their turn. Legesse then shot down the third Somali MiG-21 with 20mm fire, while his two wingmen chased down the fourth MiG-21, only for the Somali pilot to lose control of his aircraft after tight maneuvers and crash into the ground. Legesse then spotted and engaged a formation of four Somali MiG-17s, shooting down two with AIM-9 missiles, while the last two MiG-17s were able to get away, primarily because the Ethiopians were now low on fuel.

The next clash came on 26 July in Chinaksen, when Legesse and Bezabih Petros were escorting a C-47 conducting supply drops. During this operation the pair were attacked by two Somali MiG-21s who attempted to sandwich them, however the superior turning speed of the F-5 allowed the Ethiopians to quickly maneuver themselves into a superior position. Bezabih damaged the tail fin of one MiG-21 with an AIM-9 missile while Legesse finished it off with 20mm fire. The other aircraft disappeared.

The final clash came on the early morning of 1 September over Jijiga, when Legesse and his wingman Ashenafi Gebre Tsadik were tasked with providing air support to ground forces, during which the pair were approached by two Somali MiG-21s. The Ethiopians immediately made a combat turn and entered the "combat spread" formation, establishing a distance of around 1,500 metres between each other and making several cross-turns in order to maintain situational awareness as they approached their target. In the ensuing engagement, a Somali MiG fired a missile at Ashenafi, which he narrowly evaded. Ashenafi then fired his 20mm cannon, which hit the cockpit of the Somali fighter jet, killing the pilot inside. Meanwhile, Legesse approached the second MiG and as they turned away from the sun Legesse fired his AIM-9 missile at the MiG-21, destroying it.

This was the last aerial engagement of the Ogaden War. The Somali Air Force suffered a confirmed loss of 9 MiG-21MFs and 2 MiG-17s to Ethiopian fighters as well as at least three additional losses caused by crashes of its pilots in aerial combat (around half were shot down by Legesse), while the Ethiopian Air Force did not lose a single aircraft in aerial combat. As a result of this heavy attrition, the Somali Air Force did not attempt to challenge Ethiopian aerial superiority over the Ogaden.

== Capture and imprisonment ==
At noon of 1 September, Legesse returned to Dire Dawa Airport. Immediately after refueling he was ordered to provide cover for a Canberra B.52 flown by Mesfin Haile on a bombing mission in the region of Bale. Legesse flew ahead of the bomber to scout, however he was hit by fire from a Somali ZSU-23-4 Shilka. He managed to eject and land near Filtu along the Shebelle River which was then controlled by the Somali National Army. The area he landed in was infested with wild animals such as crocodiles and pythons so he was forced to climb up a tree. Sometime later he spotted an Ethiopian SA.316B helicopter and fired a flare, but was not seen by the helicopter. The next day he was awakened by a group of local women collecting water, Legesse confronted them with a gun, but they then offered him water and took him back to their village where they provided him with food. While there, they alerted Western Somali Liberation Front (WSLF) guerrillas of his presence, who subsequently arrested him without incident. He was then handed over to General Abdullahi Yusuf Ahmed. Abdullahi treated Legesse very well, and even allowed him to stay in his tent. Legesse was taken to Baidoa and then to Mogadishu, where he would be imprisoned until 1988 at the Lanta Borre prison in Mogadishu, alongside thousands of Ethiopian prisoners of war and Somali political prisoners.

== Later life ==
Legesse was released from Somali captivity in 1988. Upon his return to Ethiopia, he was immediately promoted to brigadier general and was highly decorated for his role in the Ogaden War. However, in 1991, after the fall of the Derg regime, he fled to the United States where he later died of Alzheimer's disease on 5 October 2016. He was survived by two children.
