= Ethiopian Air Force =

Aerial military force of Ethiopia

- የኢትዮጵያ አየር ኃይል; Ye-Ītyōṗṗyā āyer ḫayili
- Emblem of the Ethiopian Air Force
- Founded: 19 August 1929; 97 years ago
- Country: Ethiopia
- Type: Air force
- Role: Aerial warfare
- Size: 10,000+ personnel
- Part of: Ethiopian National Defense Force
- Anniversaries: 90
- Equipment: 200+ aircraft
- Engagements: Gugsa Wale's Rebellion; Second Italo-Ethiopian War; Eritrean War of Independence; 1964 Ethiopian-Somali Border War; Ethiopian Civil War; Ogaden War; 1982 Ethiopian-Somali Border War; Ethiopian-Eritrean War; Tigray War; OLA insurgency Fano insurgency 2026 Eritrean invasion of Ethiopia

Commanders
- Supreme Commander: President Taye Atske Selassie
- Commander-in-chief: Prime Minister Abiy Ahmed
- Chief of General Staff: Field Marshal General Birhanu Jula
- Deputy Chief of General Staff: General Abebaw Tadesse
- Chief of the Air Force: Lieutenant General Yilma Merdasa
- Deputy Chief of the Air Force: Brigadier General Tesfaye Legesse

Insignia
- Roundel

- Flag

Aircraft flown
- Fighter: MiG-23, Su-27, Su-30, Su-35
- Attack helicopter: Mil Mi-24, Mil Mi-35
- Interceptor: Su-27
- Trainer: Aero L-39 Albatros, Grob G 120TP, Yakovlev Yak-130
- Transport: Antonov An-12, Lockheed C-130 Hercules, Mil Mi-8

The Ethiopian Air Force (ETAF) (Amharic: የኢትዮጵያ አየር ኃይል, romanized: Ye-Ītyōṗṗyā āyer ḫayil) is the air service branch of the Ethiopian National Defence Force. The ETAF is tasked with protecting the national air space, providing support to ground forces, as well as assisting civil operations during war.

== History ==
=== Early years (1929–1935) ===
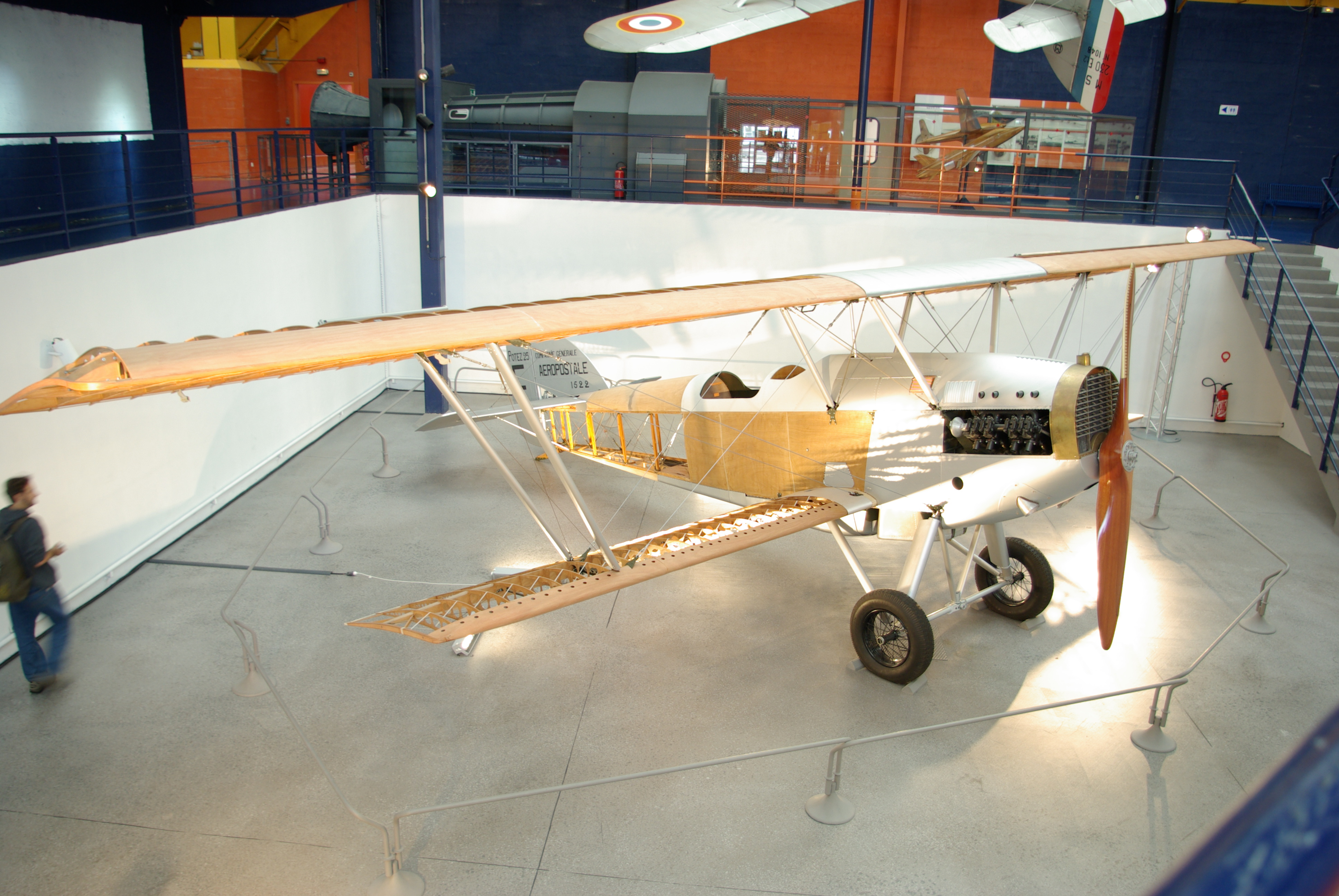
Potez 25 biplane typical of aircraft available during the beginnings of the Ethiopian Air Force.

The origins of the Ethiopian Air Force has been traced to (then Ras) Haile Selassie witnessing a show of the British Royal Air Force in November 1922, in Aden. Having never seen an airplane before, he was captivated by this demonstration of their power and abilities, and spontaneously asked if he could go up in one of the biplanes, proclaiming that it was "very fitting that he, as regent of Abyssinia should be the first Abyssinian to take flight in an aeroplane." As a result of this experience, he advocated the development of the Imperial Ethiopian Air Force. This small air arm began with the delivery of a Potez 25-A2 to the capital Addis Ababa on 18 August 1929. A Junkers W 33c followed on 5 September. The Ethiopian Air Force was organized by Mishka Babitchef, the first Ethiopian pilot, who was of Russian descent.

On 31 March 1930, three of the biplanes from Ethiopia's air arm played a dramatic role in a battle between Haile Selassie (not yet crowned Emperor) and conservative forces seeking to oust him. During the Battle of Anchem, biplanes were effectively used to give Haile Selassie's forces the upper hand.

A few transport aircraft were also acquired during 1934–35 for ambulance work. The air force was commanded by Colonel John Robinson (African-American, took command May 1935), recruited by Haile Selassie, and who remained until the Italian occupation of Ethiopia when the small air arm ceased to exist.

- 2 Beechcraft Staggerwing
- 1 Breda Ba.15
- 1 de Havilland DH.60 Moth
- 1 de Havilland Dragon (Red Cross)
- 1 Farman 192 c/n?
- 1 Farman F.190 converted to F192 by engine change, c/n?
- 1 Fiat AS-1, lost in accident 1930
- 2 Fokker F.VIIa (Named "Abba Dagnew" and "Abba Kagnew". The latter was used as ambulance)
- 1 Fokker F.VIIb/3m (used as Hailé Sélassié's personal transport, and for missions by the Red Cross)
- 1 Heinkel HD.21 (Red Cross)
- 1 Junkers W33c (acquired in 1929).
- 6 Potez 25A-2
- 1 Meindl van Nes A.VII Ethiopia 1.
- 1 Breda Ba.25.
- 1 Breda Ba.28.
- 2 Breguet XIX.

Notable pilots of the Imperial Ethiopian Air Force (1929–1936)

- André Maillet (French)
- Gaston Vedel
- Baron von Engel (German)
- Comte Schatzberg
- Hubert Julian (Trinidadian)
- Mishka Babitcheff (Russian/Ethiopian)
- Bahru Kaba (Ethiopian)
- Asfaw Ali (Ethiopian)
- Tesfaye (Ethiopian)
- John Robinson (African-American, took command in May 1935)
- Thierry Maignal
- Ludwig Weber, personal pilot of Haile Selassie and creator of Ethiopia 1
- Count Carl Gustaf von Rosen (with the Red Cross, he flew the Heinkel HD.21)

=== Modern Day ===
In October 2026, during the third Russia–Africa Summit in Moscow, Ethiopian Prime Minister Abiy Ahmed announced that Ethiopia had acquired 12 Russian-built Sukhoi Su-35 multirole fighter jets, delivered a year ahead of the original schedule, alongside plans to acquire four S-400 air defense batteries. Russian state arms exporter Rosoboronexport confirmed the formal handover of initial aircraft to the Ethiopian Air Force at Zhukovsky International Airport.

=== Post-World War II ===
After the liberation of Ethiopia, the country started reorganizing the embryonic air force that had existed prior to the Italian invasion, commanded by Colonel John Robinson (African-American). In 1944, a group of World War II African-American veterans set up a flying school at Lideta airport in Addis Ababa. The nation acquired a few aircraft through military aid from the United States and United Kingdom; and the school had some 75 students by 1946. As neither the United States nor the United Kingdom was interested in providing assistance, Ethiopia turned to Sweden to help create a modern air arm (see Ethiopia–Sweden relations). The Swedes agreed to provide assistance and Carl Gustaf von Rosen was appointed as the chief instructor of the newly re-formed Imperial Ethiopian Air Force (IEAF).

The Swedish contingent played a critical role in setting up a solid foundation. It sent Safir trainers and B-17A light bombers from Sweden, and the Ethiopian government acquired C-47 Skytrain transport aircraft from the United States to equip the flight training, bomber, and transport squadrons, respectively. In 1951, the IEAF formed its first fighter/attack squadron by acquiring Fairey Firefly fighters from the United Kingdom.

==== US assistance and transition to the jet age ====
In 1953, a military agreement was entered between the United States and Ethiopia for a military assistance program (see Ethiopia–United States relations). It aimed to provide Ethiopia with a capable military force for defensive purposes. The Department of Defense sent a team to undertake a comprehensive study of Ethiopian capabilities, requirements, and probable threats facing Ethiopia.

The Ethiopian Air Force benefited immensely from the program. The US Air Force sent a team of officers and NCOs led by a colonel to assess the force and provide recommendations as part of the Military Assistance Advisory Group studying Ethiopian Armed Forces comprehensively. The IEAF was to be reorganized and adopt US-style operating procedures. Emphasis was given to building up training institutions. Numerous Ethiopian personnel was sent to the US for training, including 25 Ethiopian pilots for jet training, and many more were trained locally by US Defense personnel. In 1957, the first three of several Lockheed T-33 Shooting Star jet trainers were supplied followed by North American F-86 Sabre fighters in 1960. In 1961, T-28 Trojans were acquired for advanced training. This influx of equipment and training made the IEAF, in the opinion of historian Bahru Zewde, "the most prestigious show-piece of American aid in Ethiopia. It was also reputedly the most modern and efficient unit of the armed forces."

After its independence in 1960, Somalia started making claims to all of its precolonial territories that were occupied by France, British and disputed lands with Ethiopia. However, the majority of the land claimed was in Ethiopia which made it Somalia's main target. After failing to get support within the Organization of African Unity, Somalia declared war on Ethiopia in 1964. The Somali forces launched their attack at Togochale, a border town east of Jijiga. The brief conflict provided the IEAF with valuable experience. Lessons learned included the need for heavy bombers, an air defense complex, a secure and reliable communication system, and better coordination with ground forces. As a result, Canberra bombers and air defense radars were acquired from Great Britain and the US respectively.

In 1964, the Somalis began receiving large quantities of weaponry, ground equipment, and MiG-17 fighters from the Soviet Union (see Ethiopia–Russia relations). In response, the US started delivering the supersonic F-5A jet fighters in 1965 to counter this new threat. However, it was careful not to escalate the situation further. The US delivered the F-5As without providing major weapon systems for the aircraft, the ability to use air-to-air missiles. Nevertheless, the delivery of F-5As had serious implications in the Horn of Africa because no neighboring country had anything similar to this new jet fighter. The Somalis were furious and described the F-5A transfer as a grave threat to the security of the Somali people and the rest of the Horn.

Although the United States trained the air force during Emperor Haile Selassie's reign and supplied new F-5 jets in April 1966, the Ethiopians restructured their air force that same year based on an Israeli Defense Force military program provided by Tel Aviv.

Already alarmed at the increasing noise the Somalis were making, the Derg government had managed to convince the Ford administration to provide Ethiopia with F-5Es in 1975. The first batch of six pilots were sent to Williams Air Force Base in Arizona for conversion and tactical fighter training in August 1976. However, further training of pilots and delivery of aircraft was stopped after President Carter cut off all arms supplies in protest of the Derg's human rights violations.

In 1977, Nos 1 and 2 Squadrons of the Ethiopian Air Force converted from the F-86 to the MiG-21, and No. 33 Operational Conversion Unit from the T-33A to the MiG-21UM and MiG-21MF; a year later, No. 3 Squadron converted from the F-86 to the Mikoyan-Gurevich MiG-23BN "Flogger." In 1980, No. 5 Squadron converted from F-86s to the MiG-21bis. Years later, all four squadrons, and 33 OCU, were reported to be based at Debre Zeit.

==== Ogaden War ====
Legesse Tefera, the most successful F-5 pilot in history, credited with shooting down 5 MiG-21s and 2 MiG 17s during the Ogaden War

The Ethiopian F-5 fighters saw combat action against Somali forces during the Ogaden War (1977–1978). The main Somali fighter aircraft was the MiG-21MF delivered in the 1970s, supported by Mikoyan-Gurevich MiG-17s delivered in the 1960s by the Soviet Union. Ethiopian F-5E aircraft were used to gain air superiority because they could use the AIM-9B air-to-air missile, while the F-5As were kept for air interdiction and airstrike. During this period Ethiopian F-5Es went on training against Ethiopian F-5As and F-86 Sabres (simulating Somali MiG-21s and MiG-17s).

On 17 July 1977, three F-5s were on combat air patrol near Gode, when four Somali MiG-21MFs were detected nearby. In the engagement, two MiG-21s were shot down while the other two had a midair collision while avoiding an AIM-9B missile. The better-trained F-5 pilots swiftly gained air superiority over the Somali Air Force, shooting down a number of aircraft, while other Somali aircraft were lost to air defense and to incidents. Records indicate that Ethiopian F-5s of the 9th Fighter Squadron "shot down 13 MiGs-17 and 12 MiGs-21 from 20th July until 1st September 1977. All aircraft were hit by Sidewinders (AIM-9)." However at least three F-5s were shot down by air defense forces during attacks against supply bases in western Somalia.

Ethiopian pilots who had flown both the F-5E and the MiG-21 considered the F-5E to be the superior fighter because of its manoeuvrability at low to medium speeds and the fact that it was far easier to fly, allowing the pilot to focus on combat rather than controlling his airplane. This effect was enhanced by the poor quality of pilot training provided by the Soviets, which provided limited flight time and focused exclusively on taking off and landing, with no practical training in air combat.

Ethiopia's ace pilot and national hero was Legesse Tefera who is credited with shooting down 6 (or 7) Somali MiGs, thus making him the most successful F-5 pilot ever. His F-5E was shot down while overflying an area thought to be in control by Ethiopian forces. He was captured by the local Somali population and was turned over to then Somali army commander of the region, Colonel Abdullahi Yusuf, and held prisoner for over 10 years.

==== Shift to the Eastern bloc ====
While the ETAF's role was critical in stopping the advance of the Somali forces, the ground forces were not ready for offensive operations to expel the Somalis from the area they controlled. The army was short in equipment of all sorts, and after the Derg acquired power United States President Jimmy Carter cut off all military aid to Ethiopia. Desperate, the Derg regime turned to the Soviets for help. The Soviet Union, which was providing assistance to Somalia, switched sides and agreed to provide substantial economic and military aid that proved to be decisive. As a result, the Air Force received a large number of aircraft for fighter, helicopter, transport roles. The Cubans provided 17,000 troops to support the Ethiopian forces, which included Cuban pilots who flew the newly Soviet-supplied MiG-21s.

In the 1980s, non-Soviet aircraft were also acquired. Several L-39C jets were acquired from Czechoslovakia for jet transition training. In addition, SF-260TP trainers were acquired from Italy in two batches to replace the aging Safirs, and two L-100 Hercules transport aircraft, the civilian version of the military C-130 Hercules transport, were acquired through Ethiopian Airlines (see Czechoslovakia-Ethiopia relations, Ethiopia-Italy relations).

==== The Derg years ====
The Derg created a three-man committee constituting the force commander, political commissar, and representative from the security service to oversee the air force. In addition, adhering to Soviet advice, the ETAF's organization was replaced by a Soviet-style regimental structure.

The Soviet influence had a major impact on the ETAF. The Soviets offered to train all pilots at a joint training center for all their satellite states leaving the ETAF responsible only for operational training. They also offered to train engineers at their schools. Expecting to realize enormous cost savings, the ETAF accepted the offer. As a result, both the flying school and Air Academy were closed in 1980 and all recruits were sent to the Soviet Union after passing aptitude test examination and medical screening.

The Derg years saw the ETAF embroiled in the Ethiopian Civil War. The ETAF played a critical role in the Derg's war effort in the north. It was the main stumbling block the rebels faced from achieving total victory. However, in the late 1980s, many in the air force began questioning the prosecution of the war. Following a failed coup in 1989, in which the ETAF's top leaders participated, its high command was decimated with arrests and executions. Eventually, the forces of the Ethiopian People's Revolutionary Democratic Front (EPRDF) overran the Derg's army and took control of the country in 1991.

=== After 1991 ===
The change of events that followed had a tremendous impact on the ETAF. In 1991, the Soviet-backed Derg regime was deposed by EPRDF rebel forces. The EPRDF ordered all members of the military, including those of the ETAF, to report to detention camps set up throughout the country. The EPRDF started reorganizing the air force soon after taking power. Shortly after taking complete control of the country, it selected about 50 officers and NCOs from the rehabilitation camps to reactivate a transport wing. In addition, more pilots and ground crew were returned to bring back the assets that were flown to neighboring countries by fleeing pilots in the final days of the Derg.

The EPRDF government was cognizant of the critical role of airpower, having experienced it first hand during its long war with Derg. It set up a new high command which included senior EPRDF military commanders and former members of the ETAF who have previously joined the EPRDF. Its primary task was to restore the ETAF to operational status.

In August 1992, the flying school was reopened and training of cadets was resumed. As a result, many of the instructor pilots under the Derg regime were allowed to return. In addition, senior EPRDF commanders assigned to the high command were sent abroad for staff training. The first batch of pilot trainees graduated in June 1995 which continued yearly afterward. However, the early period was fraught with much friction and mistrust between the retained personnel from the former Derg regime and the EPRDF military commanders assigned to ETAF.

In 1995, the EPRDF government unveiled a plan for a new Ethiopian National Defense Force. The plan called for a smaller air force with a streamlined organizational structure and fewer bases. As a medium term solution, the ETAF's air and ground assets were to be upgraded with modern systems, and completion of the maintenance and overhaul centers started under the Derg. However, lack of finance delayed the implementation of most projects. The political leadership felt there was no threat to speak of facing the country to justify large expenditures, particularly pertaining to the extensive (and expensive) upgrade project for the MIG-21/23 fighter fleet.

The unexpected outbreak of war with Eritrea in June 1998 led to a significant change in the ETAF. The entire Ethiopian National Defense Force was ill-prepared for the conflict. Most of the Ethiopian Ground Forces were located in the south and southeast. The EPRDF government considered the northern borders to be the most secure due to its then close relationship with Eritrea and had decided to leave the border security in the hands of the local militia and police forces. The case with the ETAF was no different which never had replaced its northern command base it lost when Eritrea seceded.

In the two years that followed from 1998 to 2000 and despite the many constraints, the ETAF was able to provide crucial support to the ground forces. Su-27 air superiority fighters were acquired along with advanced versions of the Mi-35 helicopter gunships. The Su-27s were used to shoot down four Eritrean Air Force MIG-29s; the first on 25 February 1999, and the second on 26 February 1999. In return, Eritrean MiG-29s shot down a total of two MiG-21 and one MiG-23 fighters during the war. One of the experienced pilots, Colonel Bezabih Petros, was one of the lead fighters and was captured by Eritrean forces for the second time, where his whereabouts are unknown. Lessons learned from the war were incorporated throughout which increased the effectiveness of the ETAF in the second year of the war. Su-25T jets with precision strike capability were acquired along with sophisticated electronic warfare systems. Its members undertook dangerous missions deep inside Eritrean territory from interdicting supply lines, reconnaissance, and destruction of air defense systems. This in turn greatly raised the morale of the Ethiopian army which enabled them to break the highly fortified Eritrean front line in an amazingly short period of time. Hence, changing the tide of the war back in the Eritrean heartland.

After the war, the ETAF was reorganized to better prepare it for future conflicts based on lessons learned during the 1998–2000 war. Changes were made to better reflect in its doctrine the effects of the newer equipments acquired ability to deploy precision guided munitions. The long running maintenance and overhaul center project, DAVEC, was also sped up and inaugurated in 2004.

==== Somalia ====
The ETAF took part in the invasion of Somalia against the Islamic Courts Union in 2006 and during the military occupation that followed. During the invasion phase of the conflict, ETAF MiGs bombed targets in Mogadishu. Several helicopters were reported destroyed by Somali insurgents during the conflict, including an Mi-24 gunship over the Somali capital. Since the withdrawal of most Ethiopian military forces from Somalia in 2009, the ETAF has occasionally carried out airstrikes in the country. During the 2022 al-Shabaab invasion the ETAF struck al-Shabaab positions in Somalia from the air in late July and early August. The air force is presently participating in attacks against Al-Shabaab insurgents in the ongoing 2025 Shabelle Offensive.

==== Tigray War and Amhara insurgency ====
In early November 2020 a conflict broke out in the Tigray Region of Ethiopia between forces loyal to the Tigray People's Liberation Front (TPLF) and the ENDF. The ETAF would almost immediately start carrying out airstrikes on TPLF targets bombing arms depots, military bases, and other targets. On 22 June 2021, an Ethiopian fighter plane bombed a market in the town Togoga killing 64 civilians and wounding 180 more. Several ETAF aircraft have also been shot down. On 29 November 2020, an ETAF Mig-23 was shot down by the TPLF leading to the capture of the pilot. On 20 April 2021, an ETAF Mil Mi-35 was shot down near Guya killing three crew members. On 23 June 2021 an ETAF Lockheed L-100 Hercules was shot down near Gijet.

In 2023 armed conflict broke out between Fano insurgents and the ENDF. Since the start of a major counter insurgency operation in October 2024, the ETAF has been extensively employed throughout as the government intensified its air campaign against Fano. Helicopter gunships and drones have reportedly been used throughout the Amhara region. Armed drones in particular have been reportedly used indiscriminately. A military helicopter reportedly crashed at Bahir Dar Airport on 16 November 2024. Gojjam Fano claimed they had downed the aircraft, while the ENDF denied any helicopter had crashed.

== Organisation ==
- 7 fighter ground attack squadrons: MiG-23, Su-27, Su-30
- 1 transport squadron: An-12, An-32, C-130B/E, Mi-8, Mi-24, Alouette III
- 1 training squadron: L-39

== Air bases ==
Ethiopian Air Force airbases

ETAF's primary base is at Harar Meda Airport in Bishoftu. There are four smaller bases used by the air force those being:

- Bahir Dar Airport
- Aba Tenna Dejazmach Yilma International Airport in Dire Dawa
- Gode Airport
- Alula Aba Nega Airport in Mek'ele

== Aircraft ==
=== Current inventory ===
Aircraft	Origin	Type	Variant	In service	Notes
Combat aircraft
MiG-23	Soviet Union	Fighter-bomber	MiG-23BN	9	
Sukhoi Su-25	Russia	CAS	Su-25UB	3	
Sukhoi Su-27	Russia	Multirole	Su-27SK	16	
Sukhoi Su-30	Russia	Multirole	Su-30K	6	
Sukhoi Su-35	Russia	Multirole	Su-35	12	
Transport aircraft
Ilyushin Il-76	Russia	Tactical Airlifter	Il-76TD	3	
Antonov An-12	Soviet Union	Transport		4	
Antonov An-32	Ukraine	Transport		1	
C-130 Hercules	United States	Tactical airlifter	C-130B/E	2	
DHC-5 Buffalo	Canada	Transport		1	
DHC-6 Twin Otter	Canada	Transport		1	
Beechcraft King Air	United States	Transport		3	One for VIP transport
Helicopters
Mil Mi-8	Russia	Utility	Mi-8/17	15	
Mil Mi-24	Russia	Attack	Mi-35	7	
Alouette III	France	Liaison		3	
Surveillance aircraft
Tsehay 2.0	Ethiopia	Surveillance aircraft		2	More to be produced
Trainer aircraft
Yakovlev Yak-130	Russia	Jet trainer		6	Total of 10 aircraft to be ordered. Aero L-39 replacement.
Sukhoi Su-25	Russia	Trainer aircraft		1	
Sukhoi Su-27	Russia	Jet trainer	Su-27UB	6	
Aero L-39	Czech Republic	Jet trainer	L-39C	15	
Grob G 120TP	Germany	Trainer		12	
UAV
Bayraktar TB2	Turkey	UCAV		4	
Bayraktar Akıncı	Turkey	UCAV			
Wing Loong II	China	UCAV		2	
Qods Mohajer-6	Iran	UCAV			
Kronshtadt Orion	Russia	UCAV			

In addition to the Air Force inventory, the Ethiopian Army operates three DHC-6, and eight Bell UH-1 Iroquois helicopters.

=== Future acquisitions ===
On 28 November 2024, on the Ethiopian Air Force's 89th anniversary, Abiy Ahmed showcased Tsehay 2.0, a locally customised surveillance plane for future use in the Ethiopian Air Force.

=== Retired aircraft ===
Previous notable aircraft operated by Ethiopia were the Lockheed T-33A, F-86F Sabre, Northrop F-5A Freedom Fighter, Northrop F-5E Tiger II, MiG-17F, MiG-21bis, Electric Canberra B.52, Douglas C-54, Fairchild C-119, de Havilland Dove, Mil Mi-6, Mil Mi-14, Aérospatiale SA 330, North American T-28, Saab 91 Safir, Saab 17, SIAI-Marchetti SF.260, Antonov An-26, Su-25, L-100-30, B-757.

== Major incidents ==
- On January 14, 1982, an Ethiopian Air Force Antonov An-26 with an unknown registration crashed near Addis Ababa, Ethiopia, killing all 73 occupants on board.
- On 9 August 2013, an Ethiopian military cargo plane crashed on landing at Mogadishu airport in Somalia, killing four of the six crew members.
- On 30 August 2018, a DHC-6 military aircraft operating as flight 808 (ET-AIU), carrying 15 members of the defense force and three civilians, crashed seven minutes away from landing at Harar Meda Airport in Bishoftu after taking off from Dire Dawa. No survivors were reported.
- On June 23, 2021, a Lockheed L-100 Hercules crashed near Gijet, Ethiopia. Unconfirmed reports indicated the aircraft was downed by the Tigray Defense Forces during the Tigray War that started in November 2020 between Ethiopia and the Tigray Region.

== Roundels ==
Roundel of Ethiopia (1946–1974)

Roundel of Ethiopia (1946–1974), type 2

Roundel of Ethiopia (1974–1985)

Roundel of Ethiopia (1985–1996)

Roundel of Ethiopia (1996–2009)

Roundel of Ethiopia (1996–2009), type 2

Roundel of Ethiopia (2019–present)

== See also ==
- Ethiopian National Defense Force
- Ethiopian Navy
