= Harar Meda Airport =

Airbase of the Ethiopian Air Force

Harar Meda Airport
- IATA: QHR; ICAO: HAHM

Summary
- Airport type: Military
- Owner: Ethiopian National Defense Force
- Operator: Ethiopian Air Force
- Location: Bishoftu, Oromia
- Elevation AMSL: 6,201 ft / 1,890 m
- Coordinates: 8.7163°N 39.0059°E
- Interactive map of Harar Meda Airport

Runways
Direction	Length		Surface
Direction	ft	m	Surface
16/34	5,940	1,811	Asphalt

Harar Meda Airport (Amharic: ሐረር ሜዳ) (IATA: QHR, ICAO: HAHM) is an airport in Bishoftu, Oromia, Ethiopia. It is the main base for the Ethiopian Air Force.

== History ==
In 1946, the beginnings of what became the Ethiopian Air Force were moved from Lideta Airfield in Addis Ababa to Bishoftu. The former facility was instead utilized by Ethiopian Airlines. The initial group of 19 Swedes under Count Carl Gustaf von Rosen, who were to train the pilots and support personal, arrived there after leaving Sweden between 9 January and 16 July 1946. Both Ethiopian cadets and the Swedish instructors took part in constructing the first buildings on the base. Six Saab 91 Safir training airplanes were bought in Sweden and flown to the new airbase on 24 December 1946. On 10 November 1947, a fleet of 16 Saab-built B-17s was landed at Bishoftu by Swedish pilots.

The airport has been used for civilian operations in the past, mainly when Bole Airport was unserviceable due to construction works. In 2005, the airport served 101,839 passengers.

2012 satellite imagery shows a number of helicopters, fighters and transport aircraft are based there.

On 11 September 2025, it was announced that a new airport in Bishoftu will launch new international flights in 2030
