= Ethiopia–Mexico relations =

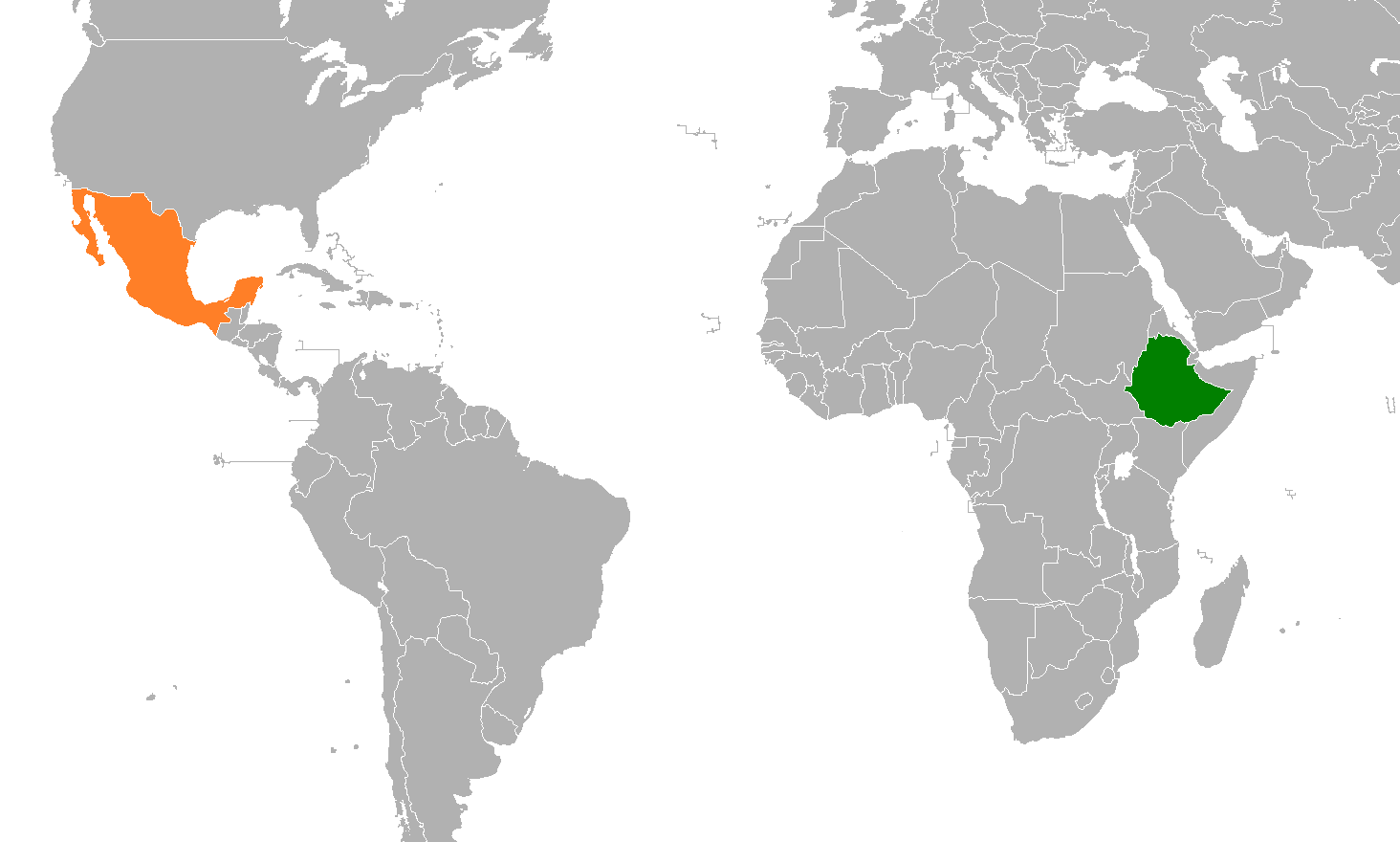

- Ethiopia: Mexico

The nations of Ethiopia and Mexico established diplomatic relations in 1949. Both nations are members of the Group of 24 and the United Nations.

== History ==
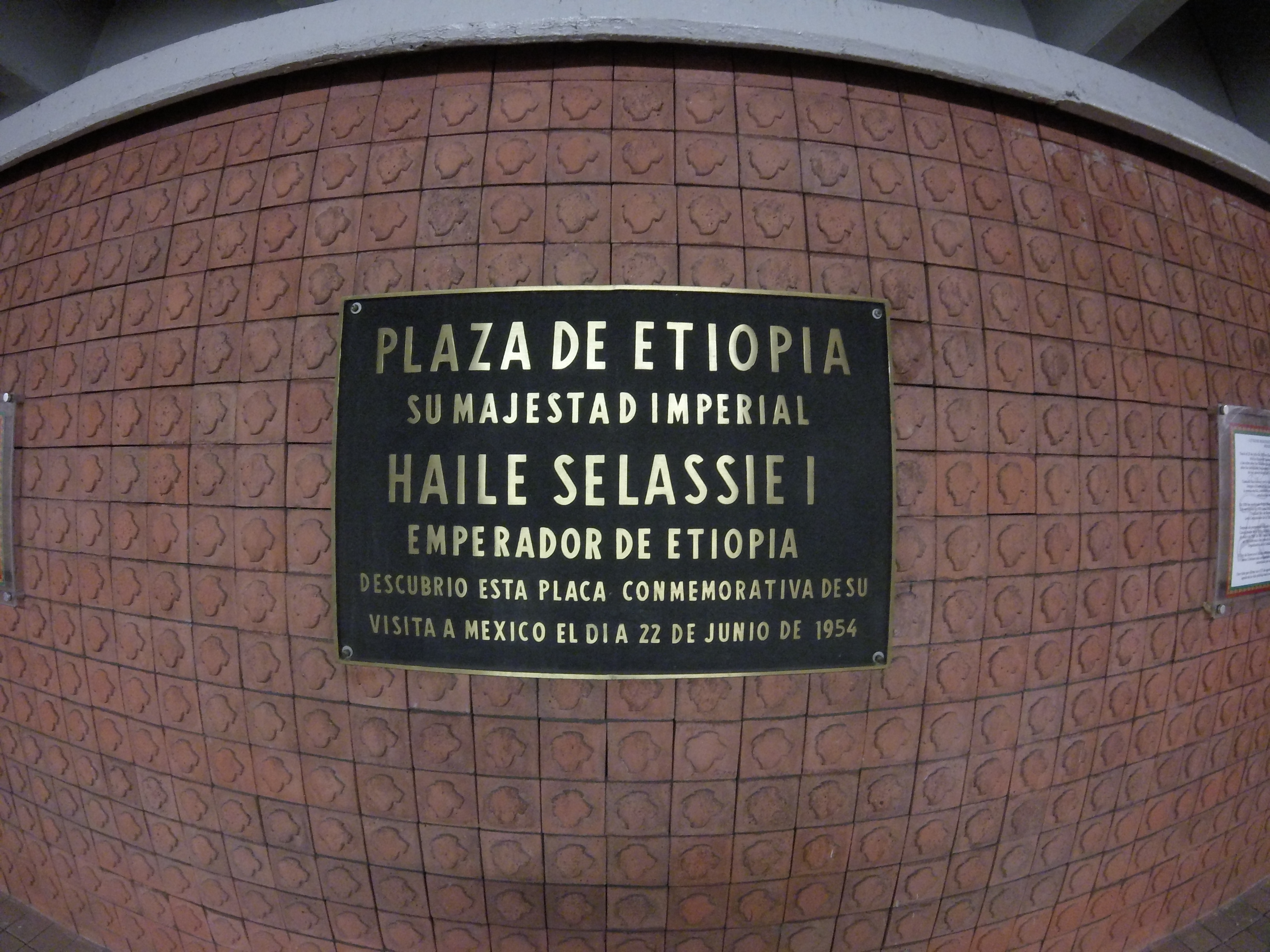
Plaque at Metro Etiopía commemorating Emperor Haile Selassie's visit to Mexico

Ethiopia was the only nation in Africa to have never been colonized by a European country. In 1935, Italian troops entered Ethiopia and occupied the country for the next five years in what was known as the Second Italo-Ethiopian War. At the League of Nations, Mexico was one of only five member states to condemn the Italian invasion and occupation of Ethiopia. Because of this, Ethiopia kept its seat in the assembly, and it remained a member of the League. A few years after World War II, diplomatic relations between Ethiopia and Mexico were established in 1949.

In 1954, Emperor Haile Selassie became the first ever head of state from an African nation to pay an official visit to Mexico and met with President Adolfo Ruiz Cortines. In 1963, both nations opened embassies in each other's capitals, respectively; however, Mexico closed its embassy in Ethiopia in 1989 due to financial reasons and Ethiopia followed suit in 1990. In 2007, Mexico re-opened its embassy in Addis Ababa.

To commemorate Mexico's assistance to Ethiopia during its occupation by Italy, Ethiopia named a central square in Addis Ababa "Mexico Square". On 22 June 1954, a traffic circle in Mexico City was named "Plaza Etiopía", and in August 1980, a metro station named Etiopía Station was opened there. In 2010, the Mexican government donated a replica of an Olmec colossal head to Ethiopia where it was placed in Mexico Square. In September 2015, the Ethiopian capital inaugurated its light rail system and has a "Mexico Station" at Mexico Square.

In May 2010, Mexican Secretary of Foreign Affairs Patricia Espinosa visited Ethiopia with the purpose of promoting issues related to the Sixteenth UN Conference for Climate Change (COP16) as well as issues of bilateral and regional interest. In July 2010, Ethiopian Prime Minister Meles Zenawi arrived in Cancún to attend the United Nations Climate Change Conference. In June 2012, Prime Minister Zenawi paid a second visit to Mexico to participate in the G-20 summit in Los Cabos. In 2017, Ethiopian Airlines launched cargo services between both nations.

In 2019, Mexican Foreign Undersecretary Julián Ventura paid a visit to Ethiopia to participate in the second meeting of the Consultation Mechanism on Matters of Common Interest between both nations.

In 2024, both nations celebrated 75 years of diplomatic relations.

== High-level visits ==
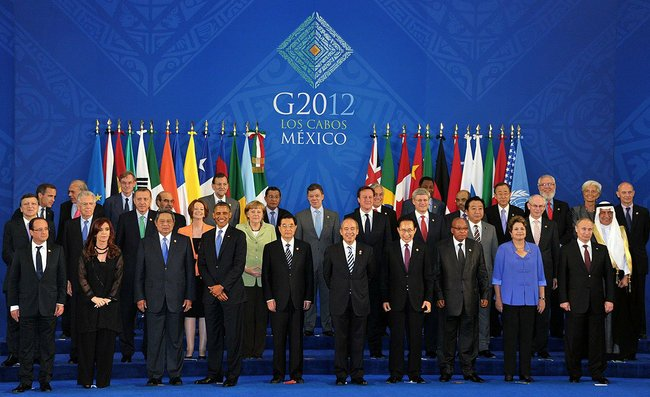
Prime Minister Meles Zenawi attending a G-20 summit in Los Cabos, Mexico, along with host, President Felipe Calderón, in 2012.

High-level visits from Ethiopia to Mexico

- Emperor Haile Selassie (1954)
- Foreign Minister Tekeda Alemu (2008, 2016)
- Prime Minister Meles Zenawi (2010, 2012)
- Foreign Minister Hailemariam Desalegn (2012)

High-level visits from Mexico to Ethiopia

- Foreign Secretary Patricia Espinosa (2010)
- Director General for Africa and Middle East Sara Valdés (2012)
- Director General for Africa and the Middle East Jorge Álvarez Fuentes (2018)
- Foreign Undersecretary Julián Ventura (2019)

== Bilateral agreements and scholarship programs ==
Both nations have signed a few bilateral agreements such as an Agreement to Establish Consultations on Mutual Interests (2007) and an Agreement on the Elimination of Visa Requirements for Diplomatic Passport Holders (2009). The Mexican government offers each year scholarships for nationals of Ethiopia to study postgraduate studies at Mexican higher education institutions.

== Trade relations ==
In 2023, two-way trade between Ethiopia and Mexico amounted to US$10.1 million. Ethiopia's main exports to Mexico include clothing, shoes, air pumps and vacuum pumps, and coffee. Mexico's main exports to Ethiopia include medicine, seeds, alcohol, and electrical wires and cables.

== Resident diplomatic missions ==
- Ethiopia is accredited to Mexico from its embassy in Washington, D.C., United States, and maintains an honorary consulate in Mexico City.
- Mexico has an embassy in Addis Ababa.

== Gallery ==
Olmec head at Mexico Square in Addis Ababa

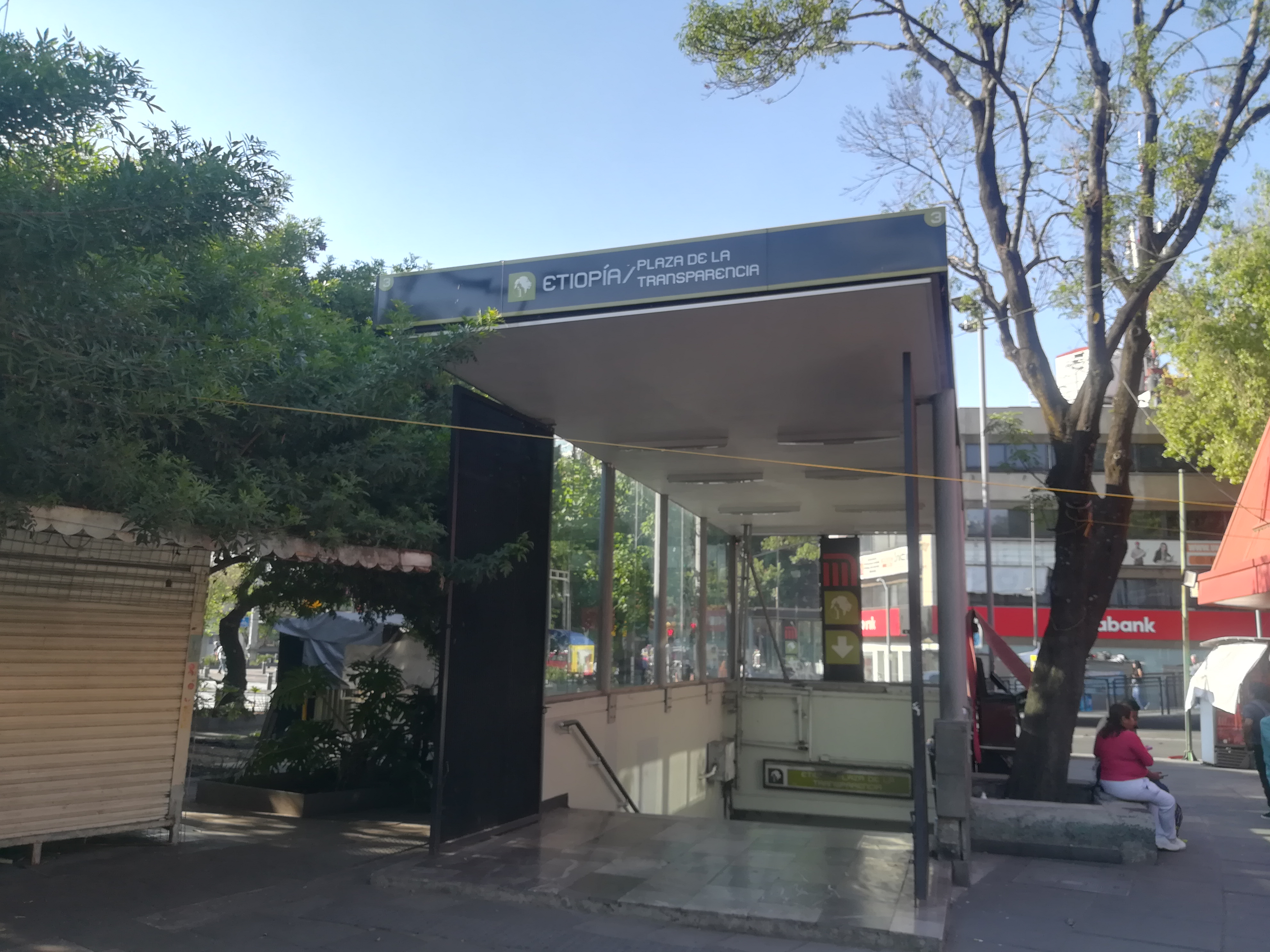
Mexico City "Ethiopia" Metro station entrance

Mexico City Metrobús "Ethiopia" station
