= Bishoftu =

City in Oromia Region, Ethiopia

Bishoftu ቢሾፍቱ
- City
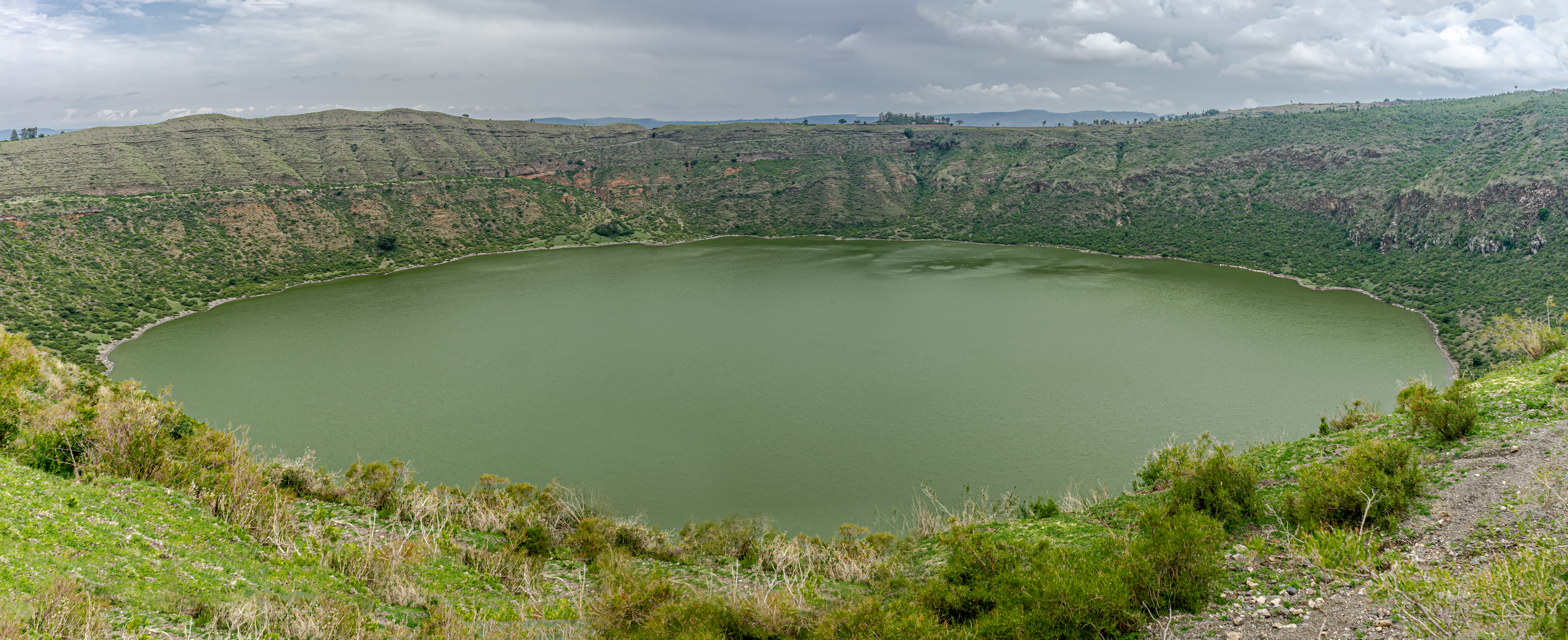
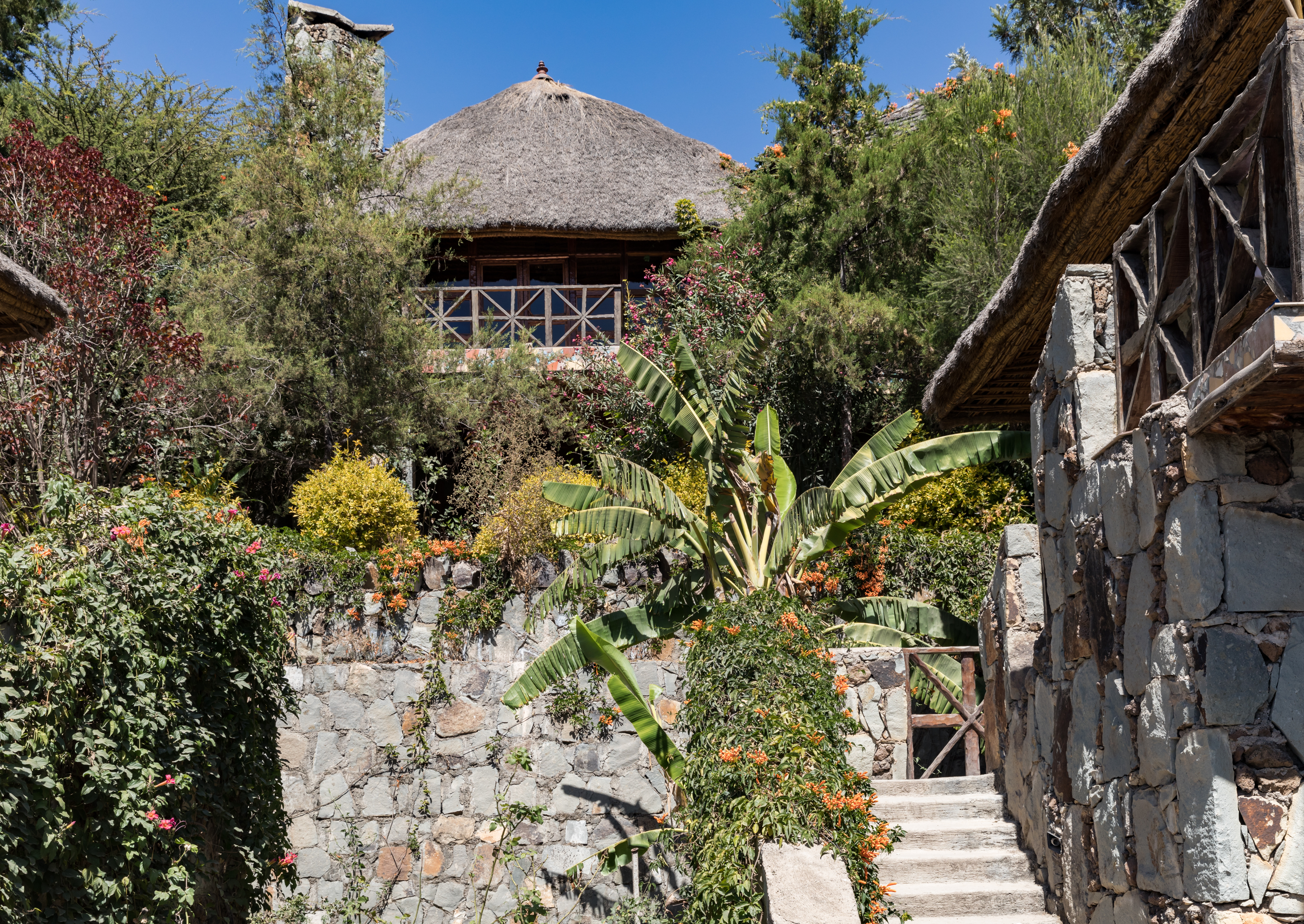
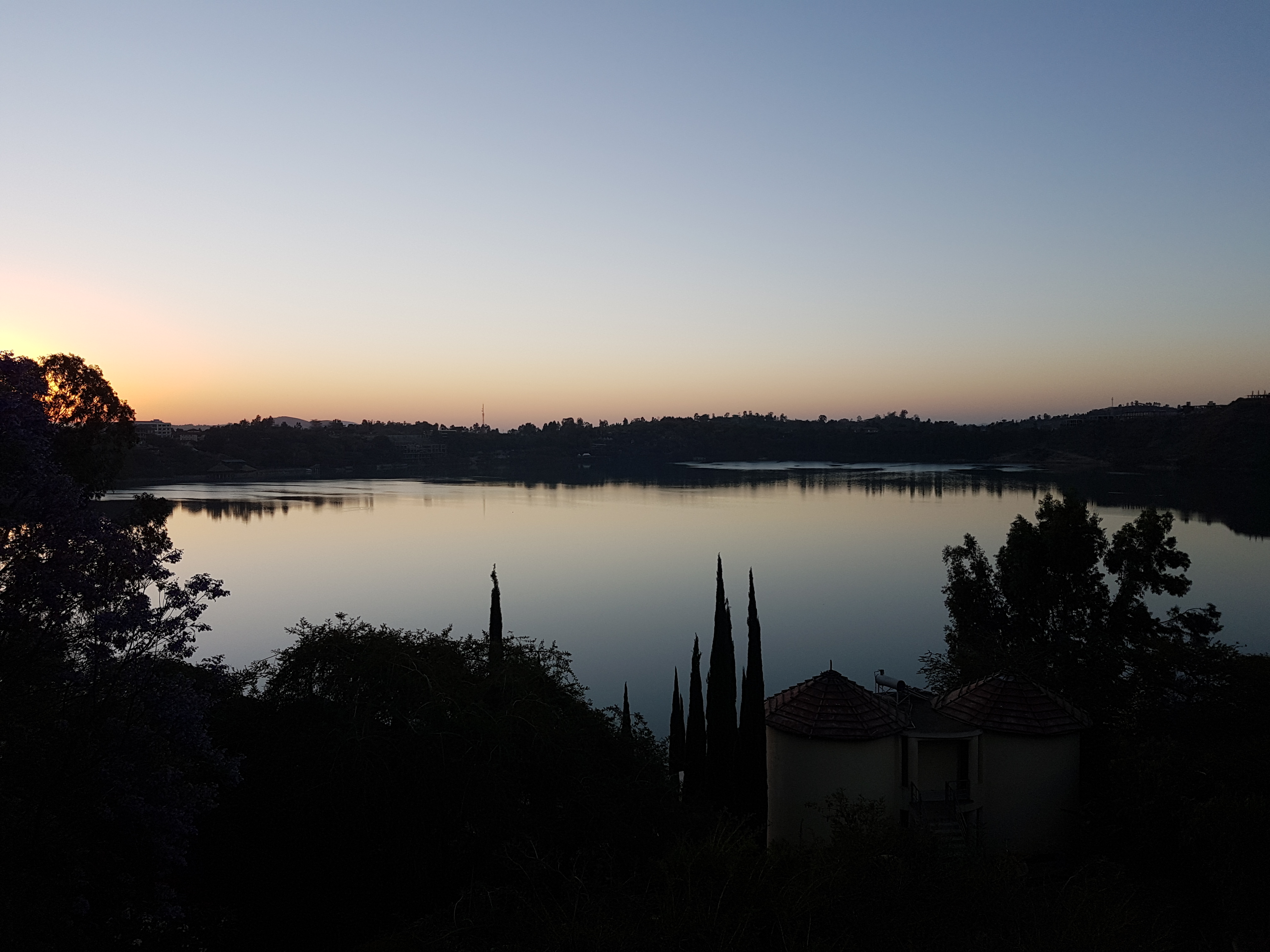
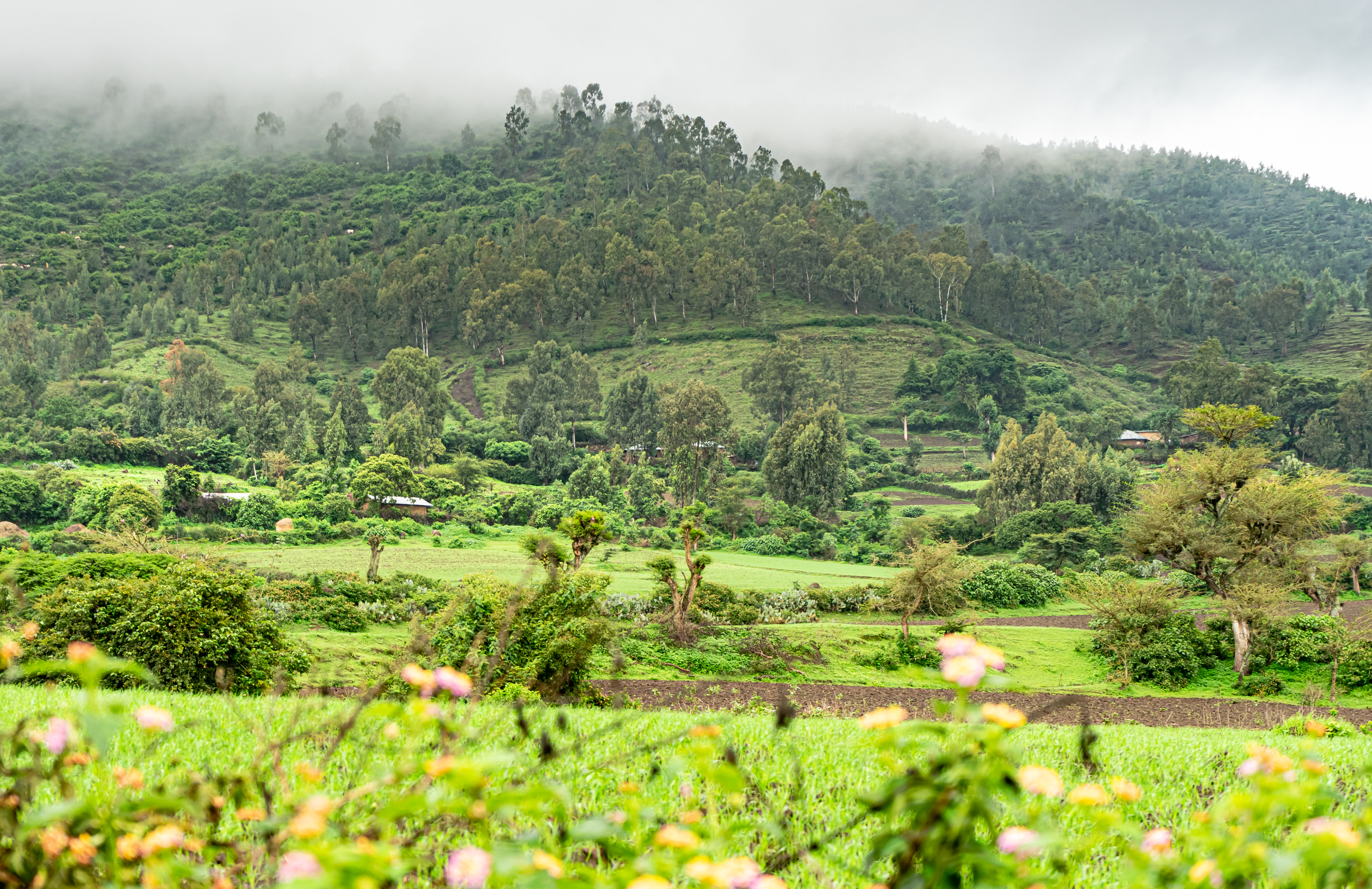
- From top left: Bishoftu Lake; Kuriftu Resorts & Spa; Lake Babogaya at dawn; Bishoftu rainforest
- Nickname: The City of Seven Lakes
- Location within Ethiopia Bishoftu (Africa)
- Coordinates: 8°45′N 38°59′E
- Country: Ethiopia
- Region: Oromia
- Zone: Bishoftu Metropolitan area

Government
  - Mayor: Alemayehu Assefa

Area
  - Total: 680 km^{2} (260 sq mi)
  - Land: 662 km^{2} (256 sq mi)
- Elevation: 1,920 m (6,300 ft)

Population (2021)
  - Total: 450,000
  - Estimate (2025): 500,000 +
  - Density: 680/km^{2} (1,800/sq mi)
- Time zone: UTC+3 (EAT)
- Area code: +251
- Climate: Cwb
- Website: Official website

Bishoftu (Oromo: Bishooftuu; Amharic: ቢሾፍቱ), formerly Debre Zeyit (Amharic: ደብረ ዘይት) is a city in central Ethiopia. Located in central Oromia Region, it sits at an elevation of 1,920 metres (6,300 ft). Its name derives from the Bible and refers to a location east of Jerusalem's Old City separated by the Kidron Valley. The city serves as the primary airbase of the Ethiopian Air Force.

Bishoftu is located 47.9 kilometres (29.8 mi) southeast of Addis Ababa along its route 4 highway. It is a resort city, known for its several lakes.

== Geography ==
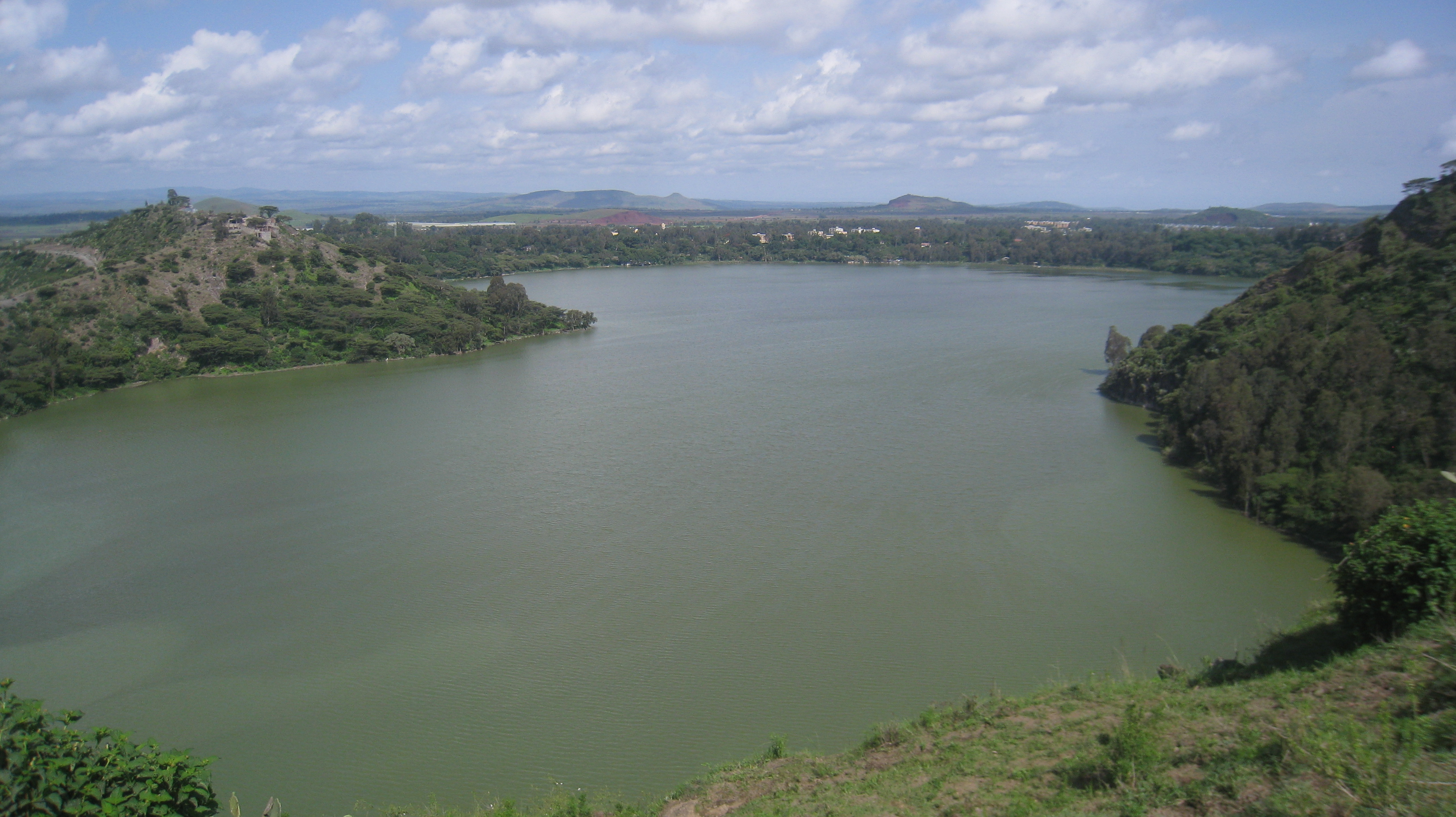
Lake Hora, one of five crater lakes in Bishoftu

The city is located within the Bishoftu volcanic field, an area of Holocene lava flows, cinder cones, tuff rings and maars. Several of the maars are water-filled, forming five crater lakes: Lake Bishoftu, Lake Hora (a base for watersports, many water birds and an annual festival), Lake Bishoftu Guda, Lake Koriftu and the seasonal Lake Cheleklaka. Other nearby points of interest include Mount Yerer, Green Crater Lake and Lake Hora Kiloli. Bishoftu is also home to the Ethiopian Air Force, Harar Meda Airport (ICAO HAHM, IATA QHR), National veterinary institute, Ethiopia and new Bishoftu International Airport (BIA) as well as a station on the Addis Ababa–Djibouti Railway.

== Climate ==
Located around 1,900 meters (6,200 feet) above sea level, Bishoftu has a relatively mild temperate climate compared to other parts of the country, with cooler temperatures year-round. The town experiences two main seasons: a rainy season from June to September and a dry season from October to May.

Climate data for Bishoftu (1991–2021 averages)
Month	Jan	Feb	Mar	Apr	May	Jun	Jul	Aug	Sep	Oct	Nov	Dec	Year
Mean daily maximum °C (°F)	24.1 (75.4)	25.7 (78.3)	26.3 (79.3)	26.3 (79.3)	26.0 (78.8)	24.2 (75.6)	22.3 (72.1)	21.8 (71.2)	22.2 (72.0)	23.1 (73.6)	23.3 (73.9)	23.1 (73.6)	24.0 (75.3)
Daily mean °C (°F)	16.7 (62.1)	18.4 (65.1)	19.5 (67.1)	19.8 (67.6)	19.6 (67.3)	18.1 (64.6)	16.9 (62.4)	16.7 (62.1)	16.9 (62.4)	16.9 (62.4)	16.6 (61.9)	16.0 (60.8)	17.7 (63.8)
Mean daily minimum °C (°F)	9.5 (49.1)	10.9 (51.6)	12.7 (54.9)	13.6 (56.5)	13.5 (56.3)	12.8 (55.0)	12.8 (55.0)	12.8 (55.0)	12.1 (53.8)	10.4 (50.7)	9.7 (49.5)	9.0 (48.2)	11.6 (53.0)
Average precipitation mm (inches)	8 (0.3)	13 (0.5)	35 (1.4)	57 (2.2)	67 (2.6)	114 (4.5)	195 (7.7)	206 (8.1)	133 (5.2)	29 (1.1)	7 (0.3)	3 (0.1)	867 (34)
Average rainy days (≥ 1.0 mm)	2	3	6	8	8	14	21	21	16	4	1	1	105
Average relative humidity (%) (daily average)	51	42	46	53	56	70	81	83	78	57	49	51	60
Mean daily sunshine hours	9.6	10.0	10.0	10.0	10.0	9.6	8.6	8.4	9.8	9.8	9.8	9.5	9.6
Source: climate-data.org

== History ==
Bishoftu, as a definite entity, did not come into existence until after the Second World War. Accounts of earlier travelers call the region "Adda", although one Swedish memoir from 1935 mentions a village named "Bishoftu". At about 1 kilometre (0.62 mi; 0.54 nmi) from Adda, on land that had been owned partly by Emperor Haile Selassie I, the Italians started Azienda Agraria di Biscioftu dell'Opera Nazionale per i Combattenti on 15,000 hectares, intending to create a center of colonization as well as an experimental agricultural station. The first foundation stone for the houses was laid 9 December 1937, but only 21 dwellings were ready by May 1938. Various administrative and service buildings were also built.

The history of the Ethiopian Air Force is tightly woven with the history of Bishoftu. In 1946, the beginnings of what would become the Ethiopian Air Force was moved from Lideta airport in Addis Ababa, which was needed by Ethiopian Airlines, to Bishoftu. The initial group of 19 Swedes under Count Carl Gustaf von Rosen, who were to train the pilots and support personnel, arrived there after leaving Sweden between 9 January and 16 July 1946. Both Ethiopian cadets and the Swedish instructors took part in constructing the first buildings on the base. Six Saab 91 Safir training airplanes were bought in Sweden and flown to the new airbase 24 December 1946, and on 10 November 1947, a fleet of 16 Saab-built B-17s were landed at Bishoftu by Swedish pilots.

Bishoftu has had telephone service since 1954.

Bishoftu Technical High School was established in 1958 with a 5-year course for boys 12–15 years of age. An Evangelical College had been founded two years before, which was a joint undertaking of Swedish, Norwegian, and German Evangelical missions. The Evangelical College's first headmaster was Sven Rubenson. The Animal Health Assistants Training School was established in Bishoftu in 1963, with financial support by the United Nations Special Fund.

The artist Lemma Tesefa Kesime was born (1956) in Bishoftu. He studied at the Art School 1972-1974 and received his M.A. from the Soviet Union in 1983. Returning to Ethiopia, Lemma Tesefa became a teacher at the art school in Addis Ababa. Bishoftu was also the favored weekend retreat of Emperor Haile Selassie, who built a palace in the town, named "Fairfield" after his wartime home in exile in the town of Bath, England.

Armed forces of the Ethiopian People's Revolutionary Democratic Front bypassed the capital and occupied Bishoftu in May, 1991, bringing order to the area after the collapse of the Mengistu government, taking control of what remained of the Soviet-supplied Air Force. The airbase was also used to detain several dozen senior military officers after the capture of the capital. On 2 October 2016 at Irreechaa celebration security forces fired tear gas at protesters forcing them to panic and as a result 52 people lost their lives after falling into ditches around Lake Hora.

On 10 March 2019, Ethiopian Airlines Flight 302 crashed near the town of Bishoftu. All 157 people aboard killed.

On 10 January 2026, construction began on Bishoftu International Airport. It is scheduled to be completed in 2030.

== Demographics ==
The 2007 national census reported a total population for Bishoftu of 99,928, of whom 47,860 were men and 52,068 were women. The majority of the inhabitants said they practiced Ethiopian Orthodox Christianity, with 79.75% of the population reporting they observed this belief, while 13.82% of the population were Protestant, and 4.98% of the population were Muslim.

The 1994 census reported Bishoftu had a total population of 73,372 of whom 35,058 were men and 38,314 were women. The three largest ethnic groups reported for this town were the Oromo (20.74%), the Amhara (71.01%) and the Gurage (8.30%); all other ethnic groups made up 9.44% of the population. Amharic is spoken as a first language by 71.95%, and 20.12% spoke Oromo; the remaining 7.93% spoke all other primary languages reported. Concerning religious beliefs, 87.87% of the population said they practiced Ethiopian Orthodox Christianity, 6.93% were Protestants, and 4.02% were Muslim.

== Organisations ==
The city is home for the National Veterinary Institute of Ethiopia, established in 1963, the leading veterinary vaccine research and production center currently producing more than 20 livestock vaccines. Next door to the national veterinary institute is the school of veterinary medicine of Addis Ababa University. The Gafat Armament Engineering Complex is located here. According to the Nordic Africa Institute website, other major businesses in Bishoftu include the Ada Flour and Pasta Factory, the Pasqua Giuseppe PLC, the Salmida Leather Products Manufacturing, Ratson (Women Youth Children Development Programme), and Winrock International Ethiopia. The Bishoftu Research Center, founded in 1953, is run by the Ethiopian Institute of Agricultural Research, specializing in agricultural research, which includes acting as the national center for research to improve the yield of teff, lentils, chickpeas, and poultry. In January 2007 Bishoftu became the new home of Meserete Kristos Seminary (formerly Meserete Kristos College), a seminary owned by the Meserete Kristos Church.
