= 1989 Ethiopian coup attempt =

Coup d'état attempt against Mengistu Haile Mariam

1989 Ethiopian coup d'état attempt
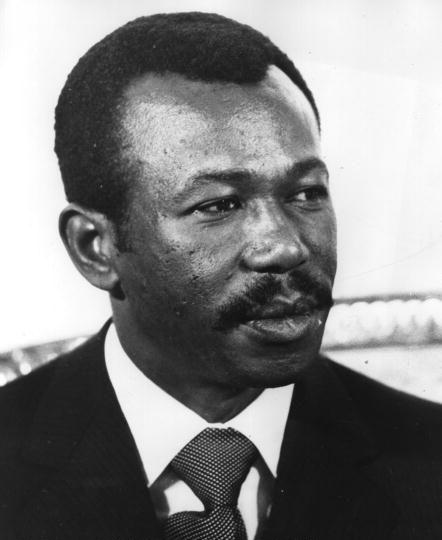
- The coup attempt was targeted by military faction from the Ethiopian Air Force against Mengistu Haile Mariam's power
Date	16 May 1989
Location	Addis Ababa, Asmera, People's Democratic Republic of Ethiopia 9°1′48″N 38°44′24″E
Result	Coup attempt fails.: Mengistu Haile Mariam remains in power.

Belligerents
Government	Military faction

Commanders and leaders
Mengistu Haile Mariam; Haile Giyorgis Habte Mariam (executed)	Fanta Belay; Demessie Bulto; Hailu Gabre Michael (executed); Worku Zwede (executed)

The 1989 Ethiopian coup d'état attempt took place on 16 May 1989, when President of the People's Democratic Republic of Ethiopia (PDRE) Mengistu Haile Mariam was out of the country for a four-day state visit to East Germany.

== Coup ==
The coup attempt was staged by senior military officers, led by former Air Force commander, Major General Fanta Belay and 2nd Revolutionary Army commander, Demessie Bulto; the Minister of Defense, Haile Giyorgis Habte Mariam, was killed by Major General Abera Abebe after refusing to join the revolt. Mengistu returned within 24 hours and nine generals, including the then-current Air Force commander and the Army Chief of Staff, died as the coup was crushed. After being captured, Major General Fanta Belay was killed while trying to escape. 12 more high-ranking military officers were executed in 1990 for their role in the coup attempt. Another general, Merid Negussie, took his own life to avoid capture by Mengistu's forces.
