= 2013 Ethiopian Air Force An-12 crash =

2013 aviation accident in Somalia

Coordinates: 02°00′49″N 045°18′17″E

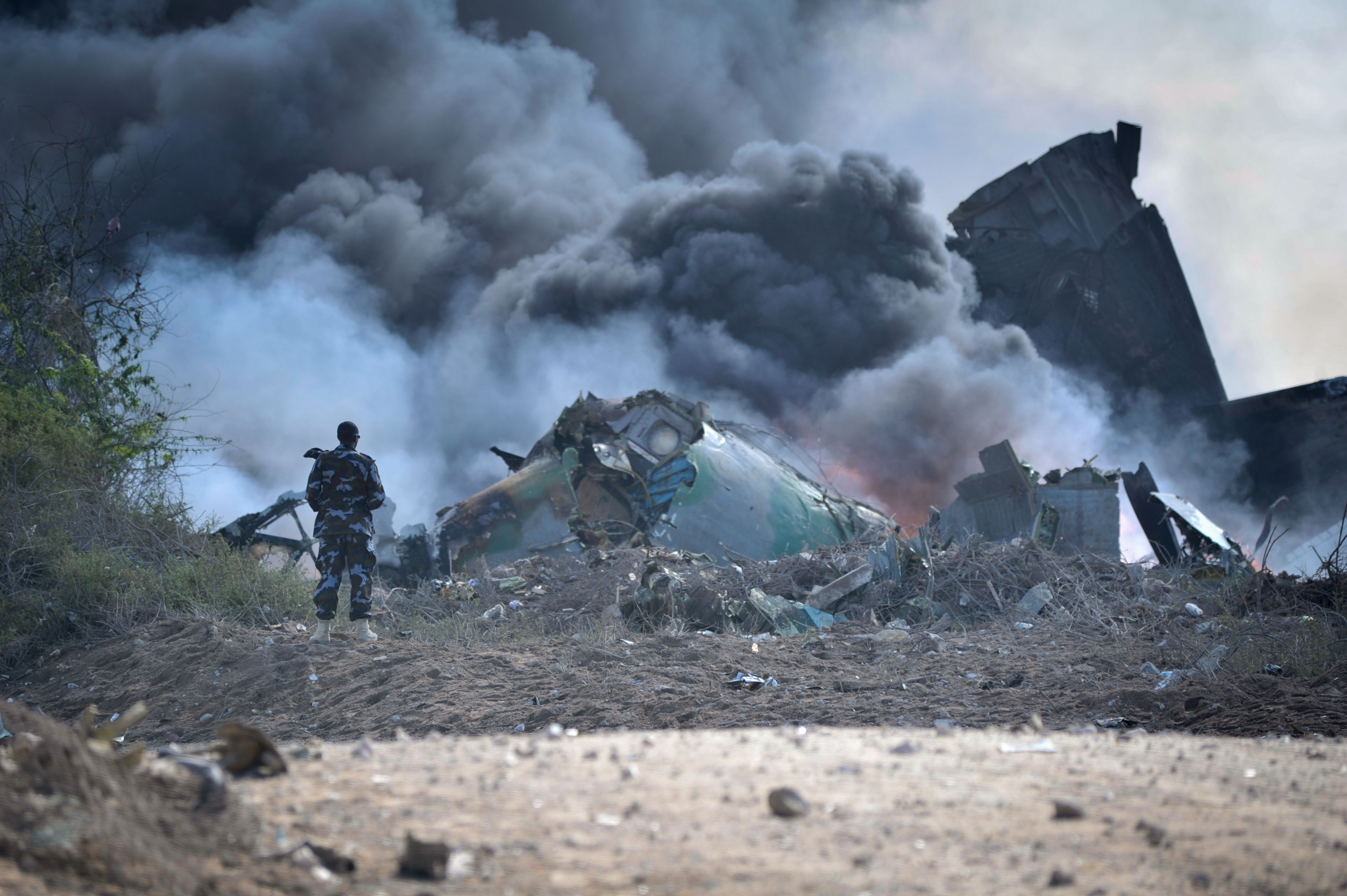
- The wreckage of the An-12

Accident
- Date: 9 August 2013
- Summary: Hijacking and grenade explosion
- Site: Aden Abdulle International Airport, Mogadishu, Somalia

Aircraft
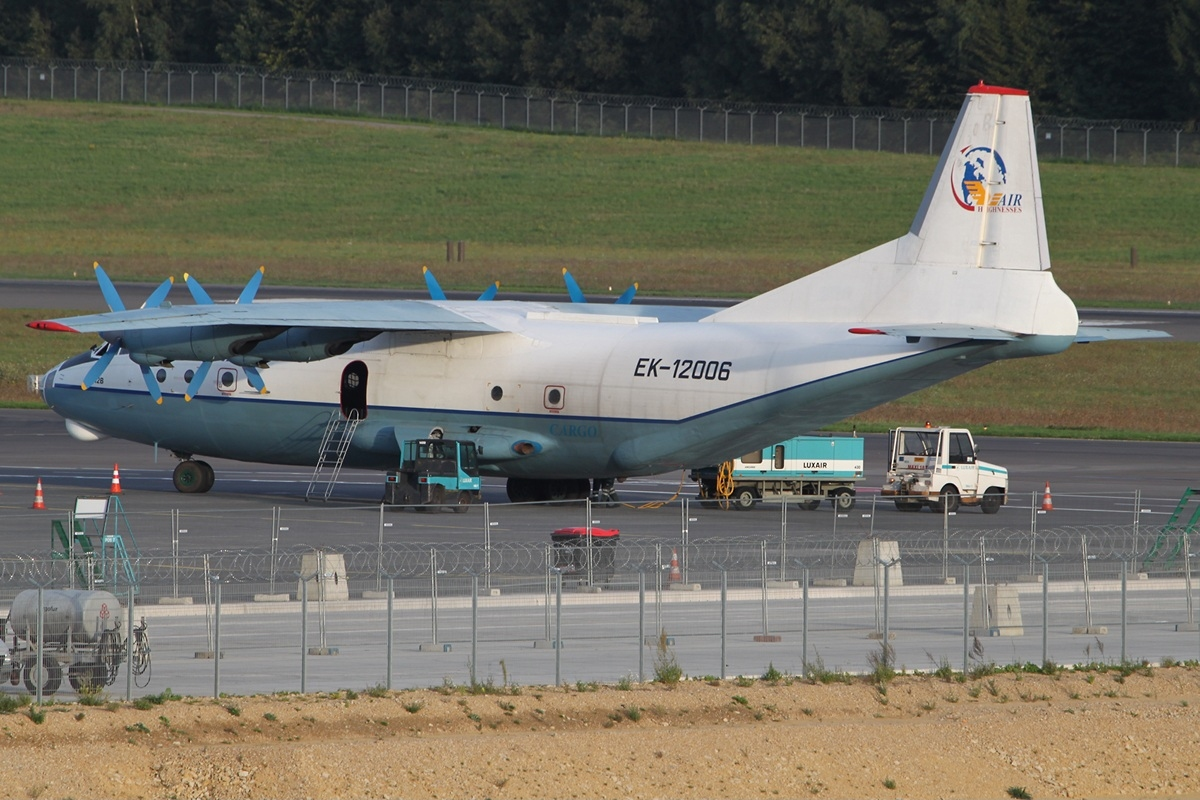
- A similar Antonov AN-12
- Aircraft type: Antonov An-12
- Operator: Ethiopian Air Force
- Registration: 1513
- Flight origin: Dire Dawa Airport, Ethiopia
- Destination: Aden Abdulle International Airport, Mogadishu, Somalia
- Occupants: 6
- Crew: 6
- Fatalities: 4
- Injuries: 2
- Survivors: 2

On 9 August 2013, an Antonov An-12 operated by the Ethiopian Air Force crashed while attempting to land at Aden Abdulle International Airport in Mogadishu, Somalia. There were six crew on board, of which four perished and two survived with injuries.

== Accident ==
The flight departed from Dire Dawa International Airport in Ethiopia at 06:00 local time that morning, commanded by Colonel Berhanu Geremew, Co-Pilot Berhanu Etefa, a highly experienced pilot. It was carrying a cargo of weapons and ammunition. The aircraft was cleared for a visual approach to runway 05 in Mogadishu but crashed to the left of the runway at 07:58 local time.

Due to the location of the crash on the airport property, the Rescue Fire Fighting Service led by AMISOM firefighters and SKA airport employees were able to respond to the impact site within 90 seconds. Two crew members were rescued from the aircraft wreckage and transferred to the AMISOM Level 2 hospital with injuries. The other four crew, were killed upon impact. The aircraft was consumed and destroyed by a fire. There was no damage to the airport runway or other facilities.

The airport remained closed for nearly 7 hours due to the accident and re-opened to commercial traffic at 14:55 local time. The first departure after resumption of operations was a Turkish Airlines Airbus A321 to Djibouti and Istanbul.

== Investigation ==
The Government of Somalia appointed a 7-person committee to investigate the accident. It contained representatives from the Ministry of Transport, Somali Civil Aviation and Meteorology Authority, Somali Police Force, National Intelligence Security Agency, Somali Air Force, SKA International Group and AMISOM. The committee presented a preliminary report that ruled out foul play as a cause of the accident. The final report is due after analysis of the black boxes recovered from the wreckage.
