= Merid Negussie =

Ethiopian military officer (1934–1989)

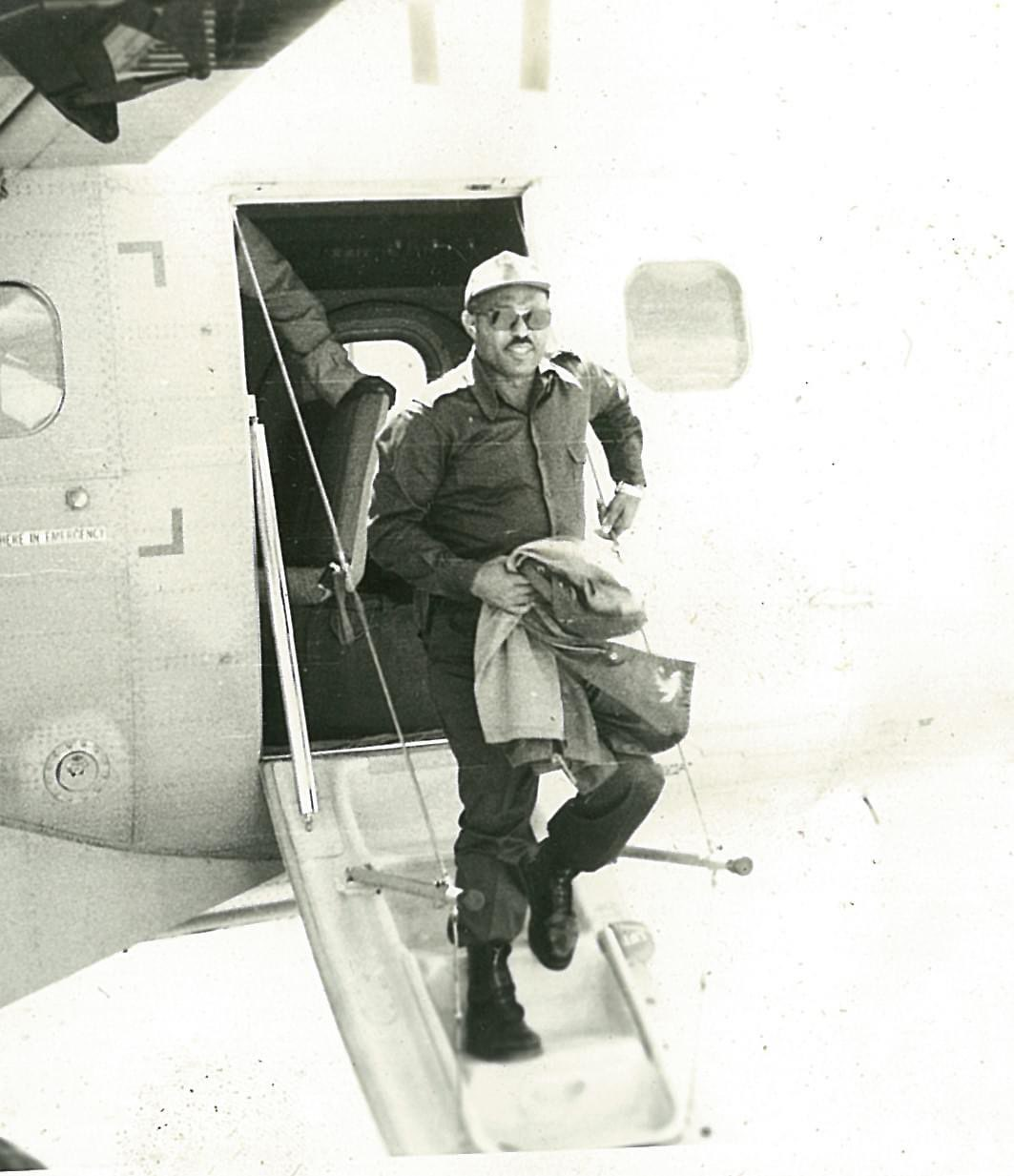
- Born: 21 January 1934; Sululta, Shewa, Ethiopian Empire
- Died: 16 May 1989 (aged 55); Addis Ababa, PDR Ethiopia
- Military career
- Allegiance: Ethiopian Empire (Ethiopia) Derg
- Branch: Ethiopian Ground Forces
- Service years: 1946–1989
- Rank: Major General
- Conflicts: Congo Crisis; Eritrean War of Independence; Ogaden War; Ethiopian Civil War

Major General Merid Negussie (Amharic: መርዕድ ንጉሤ, 21 January 1934 – 16 May 1989) was an Ethiopian military officer and member of the Derg regime who was the commander of Ethiopian forces in Eritrea during the Eritrean War of Independence. He was one of the leaders of the failed 1989 Ethiopian coup d'état attempt.

== Early life ==
Merid Negussie was born on January 21, 1934, in the small village of Leku in the Sululta district of Shoa Province to a family of Oromo peasants. Merid attended elementary school in Waliso town and at Beyene Merid elementary in Addis Ababa. He continued his secondary school education in the capital where he attended Kokebe Tsibah Haile Selassie I school. Merid became a cadet at the Imperial bodyguard academy graduating in 1946 with the rank of Second lieutenant after three years of training. Upon graduation, the young officer married Woizero Aselefech Hailemariam.

== Career ==
At the beginning of his military career, he served as a platoon commander in the imperial bodyguard. As part of the Ethiopian contingent of United Nations Operation in the Congo, he served as a deputy operation officer. After the 1960 Ethiopian coup d'état attempt, he was sent to serve in Eritrea. Following his service at Eritrea, he became training officer of the Fourth division of the army in Addis Ababa. Subsequently, he served as Operation Officer of the command post in Bale province and Commander of the 28th infantry Battalion in Negele Borana where he played a prominent role in coordinating and leading the 1974 Ethiopian coup d'état.

As the Derg did not tolerate public dissent in the central committee Merid was demoted after getting into a public fight with a fellow officer General Gebre-Kristos, and he was not reinstated until General Gebre had fled from Ethiopia.

In the mid-seventies, the Ethiopian army was fighting on two fronts; to repel the Somali invasion and curb the advance of secessionist movements of EPLF & ELF. To reinforce the fighting force, the then- Colonel Merid rapidly trained the Seventh division of the army and led the battle-ready division on its campaign in Eritrea. He was then promoted to the position of commander of the forces in Eritrea. As a recognition of his heroic exploits on the battlefields in Eritrea and his exceptional leadership, he became the first officer to ascend to the rank of Brigadier General under the Derg regime and was awarded the Medal for Valor. He later rose to the position of Chief of the General Staff of Ethiopian Armed Forces, in which capacity, he led "Operation Lash" that swept remnants of the invading Somali army from Ethiopian soil.

He then served as administrator of Hararghe and Eritrea administrative regions consecutively. His service as administrator of Eritrea was notable in many ways. In addition to being the chief executive of the region, he was assigned as commander of the Second Revolutionary Army. During his service in Eritrea, he worked tirelessly to bring about peace and improve the livelihood of the people of this restive region through good governance and dialog with community leaders and elders. However, his efforts were frustrated by the persistent objection of officials in highest ranks of the military government.

== Death ==
After a total of over four years of service in Eritrea, General Merid returned to Addis Ababa and assumed his former position of Chief of the General staff of the Armed Forces. Gravely concerned about the misguided policies Colonel Mengistu espoused and the precipice that it has led the country to, General Merid, and other leaders of the armed forces started planning the removal of Mengistu from power. Refusing to surrender to forces loyal to Mengistu during the 1989 Ethiopian coup d'état attempt he took his own life.
