= Mexico Square =

Traffic circle in Addis Ababa, Ethiopia

Coordinates: 9.010223°N 38.744509°E

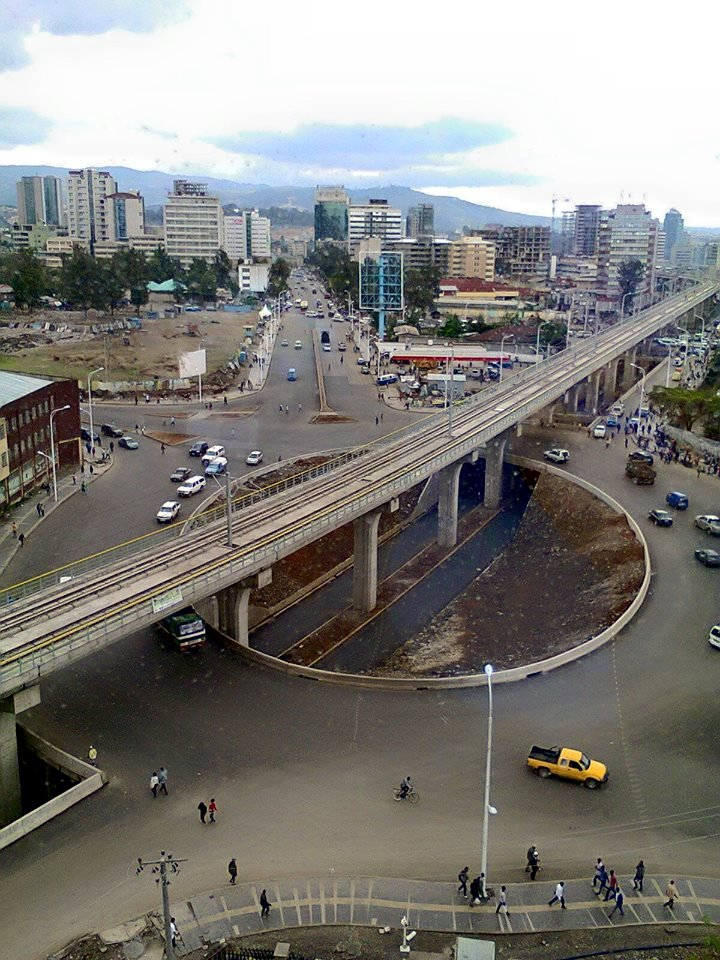
Light Rail overpass over the traffic Circle of Mexico Square

Mexico Square is a traffic circle in Addis Ababa, Ethiopia named after the country of Mexico. After the Second Italo-Ethiopian War, Mexico was one of only five countries that refused to recognize Italy's annexation of Ethiopia. Mexican support for an independent Ethiopia was a key event in Ethiopia–Mexico relations.

The Addis Ababa Light Rail system has an overpass over Mexico Square. In 2013, much of the square was demolished to make way for the train. Mexico station is located about 500 meters to the east of the traffic circle.

There was a corresponding Ethiopia Square in Mexico City, which was also the location of a traffic circle. Ethiopia Square was replaced by a metro station, Metro Etiopía.

== Gallery ==
Olmec head at Mexico Square (circa 2013)
