= Kuriftu Resorts & Spa =

Hotel chain in Ethiopia

- ኩሪፍቱ ሪዞርትና ስፓ
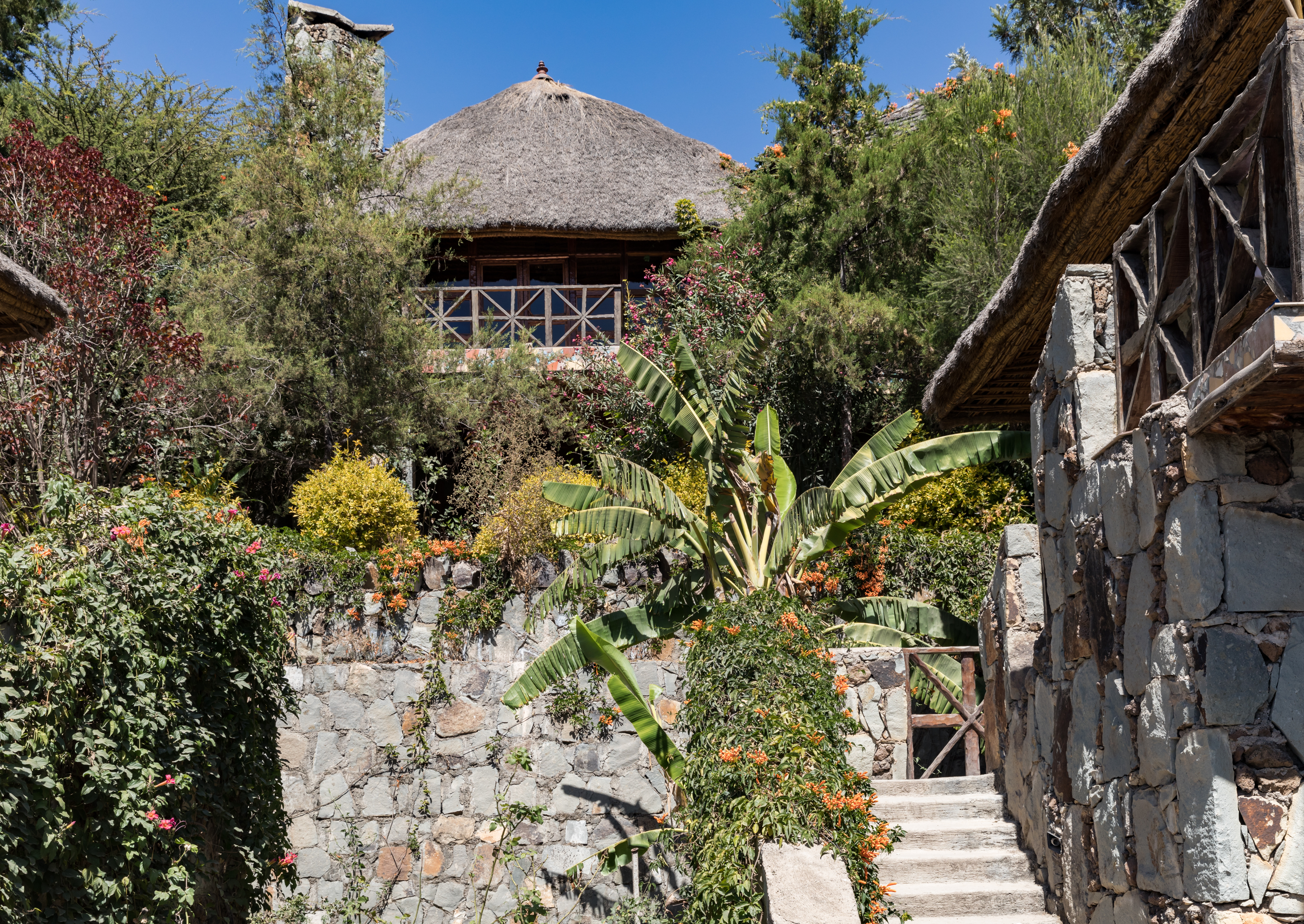
- Kuriftu Resorts & Spa in Bishoftu
- Interactive map of the Kuriftu Resorts & Spa area

General information
- Location: Ethiopia (Bishoftu, Adama, Bahir Dar, Langano and Semera)
- Coordinates: 8.780345°N 39.002870°E
- Inaugurated: 2002
- Owner: Boston Partners Group
- Landlord: Boston Partners Group

Design and construction
- Developer: Boston Partners Group

Other information
- Number of rooms: 89

Website
- Official website

Kuriftu Resorts & Spa (Amharic: ኩሪፍቱ ሪዞርትና ስፓ) is a hotel chain in Ethiopia, serving Djibouti and Moucha Island. Founded, managed and operated by the Boston Partners Group in cooperation with Tadiwos Belete in 2002, the resort has various branches in Ethiopia; one of the main branch is located in Bishoftu, whereas the other in Bahir Dar, Adama, Langano and Semera.

In August 2019, the first water park was inaugurated near Kuriftu Resorts with occupying 72,000 square meters and has exhibition and 123 shopping centers and three banks.

== Overview ==
Kuriftu Resorts & Spa was founded by Tadiwos G. Belete with Boston Partners Group in 2002. It is located in Bishoftu in Oromia Region with various extensions in notable towns, such as Bahir Dar, Adama, Langano and Semera. The interior of the resort adorned by locally produced artworks where each guest room is designed to feature an average of four art pieces; elements ranging from carpets and ceilings to furniture and fixtures, all are produced locally.

Boston Partners Group are collaborating to extend the resort services into Djibouti and Moucha Island. On 6 December 2018, Djibouti Kuriftu Resort was inaugurated in a grand ceremony hosted by President Ismail Omar Guelleh. It took the construction with 2 million USD.

In 54 villas in the site, there are Ethiopian or other continents' arts. Additionally, the Kuriftu Ethiopia Cultural Village, an expansion near the resort showcases handcraft and fashion exhibition where visitors can see or engaged in the craft.

== Water park ==
Kuriftu Resort & Spa built 72,000 square meters landed water park in Ethiopia in Bishoftu, which was inaugurated on 31 August 2019. It has 123 shops and three banks. Tadios told that the park would have its own contribution for tourism in Ethiopia. The water park created employed for 1,000 unemployed youth.
