= Addis Ababa Light Rail =

Light rail transportation service in Addis Ababa, Ethiopia

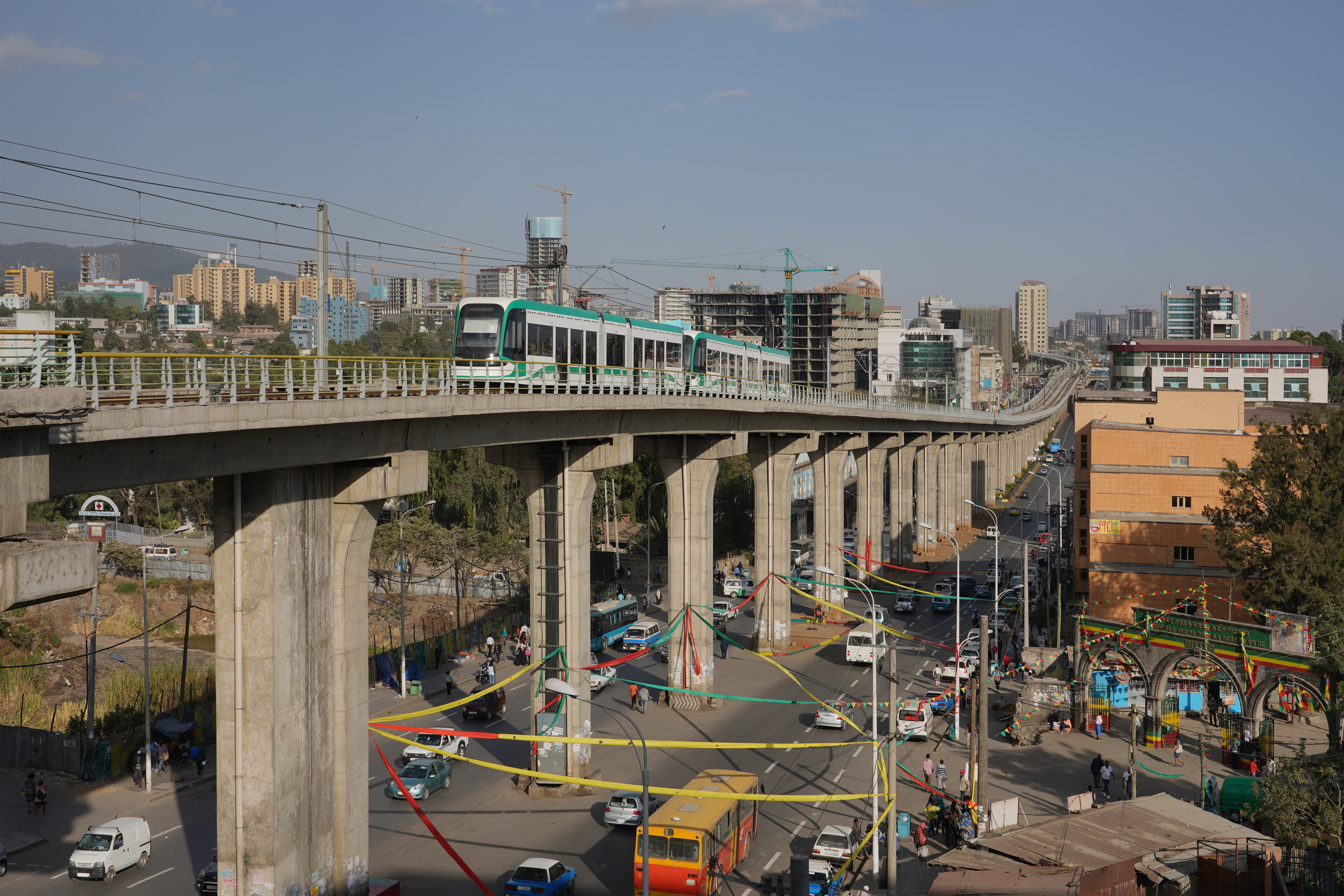

Overview
- Native name: የአዲስ አበባ ቀላል ባቡር
- Locale: Addis Ababa, Ethiopia
- Transit type: Light rail
- Number of lines: 2
- Number of stations: 39
- Daily ridership: 56,000

Operation
- Began operation: 20 September 2015; 11 years ago
- Operators: Ethiopian Railway Corporation, Shenzhen Metro Group
- Number of vehicles: 41 (17 in operation)

Technical
- System length: 31.6 km (19.6 mi)
- Track gauge: 1,435 mm (4 ft 8 1/2 in) standard gauge
- Electrification: 750V DC Overhead catenary
- Top speed: 80 km/h (50 mph)
System map
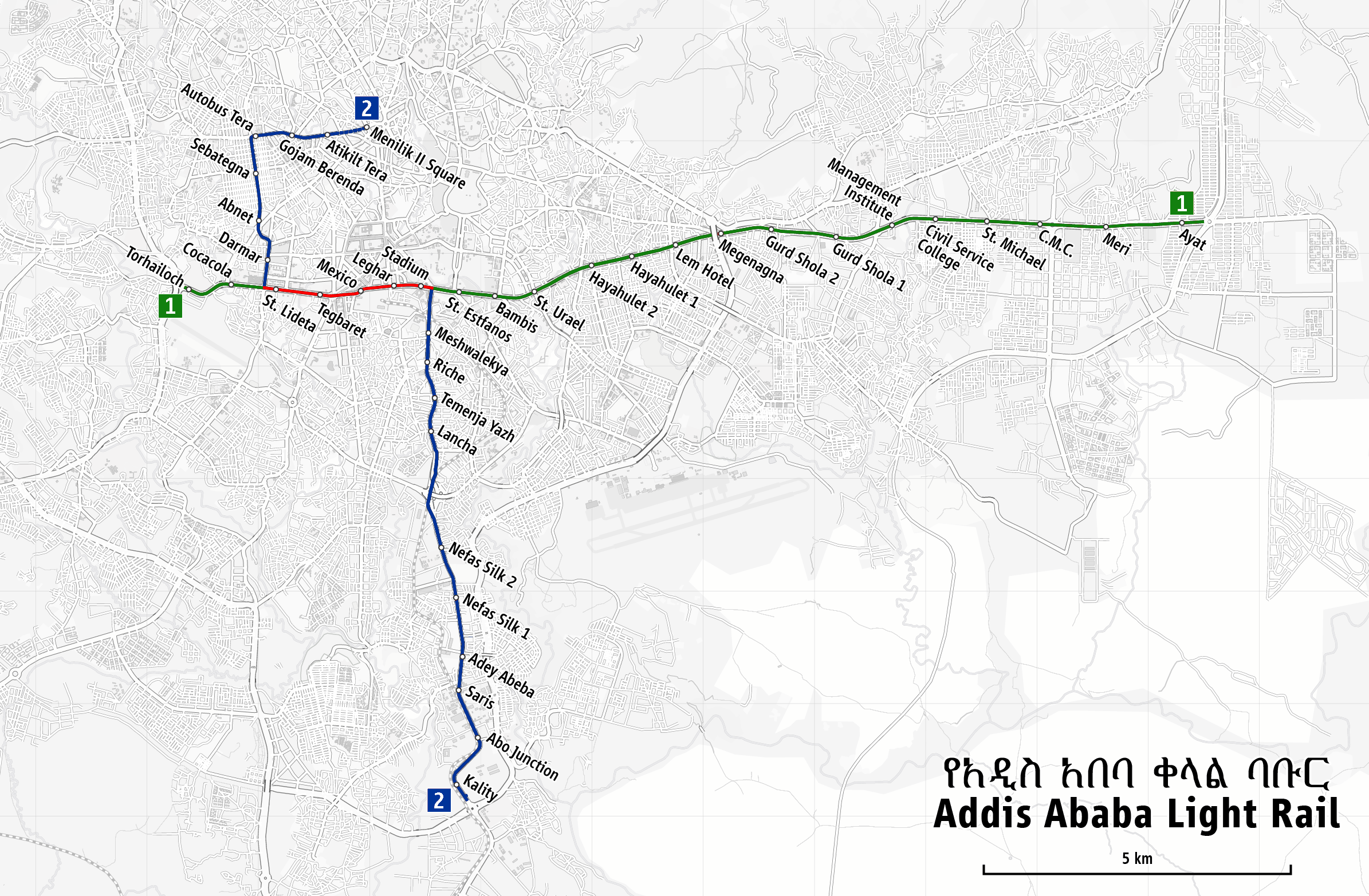

The Addis Ababa Light Rail (Amharic: የአዲስ አበባ ቀላል ባቡር, romanized: Ye’Adīsi Abeba k’elali Baburi) is a light rail system in Addis Ababa, Ethiopia. It is the first light rail and rapid transit in East and Sub-Saharan Africa.

A 17-kilometre (11 mi) line running from the city centre to industrial areas in the south of the city was opened on 20 September 2015 and inaugurated by Prime Minister Hailemariam Desalegn. Service began on 9 November 2015 for the second line (west-east). The total length of both lines is 31.6 kilometres (19.6 mi), with 39 stations. Trains are expected to be able to reach maximum speeds of 70 km/h (43 mph).

The railway was contracted by China Railway Group Limited. The Ethiopian Railways Corporation began construction of the double-track electrified light rail transit project in December 2011 after securing funds from the Export-Import Bank of China. Trial operations were begun on 1 February 2015, with several months of testing following that. It is operated by the Shenzhen Metro Group.

== Overview ==
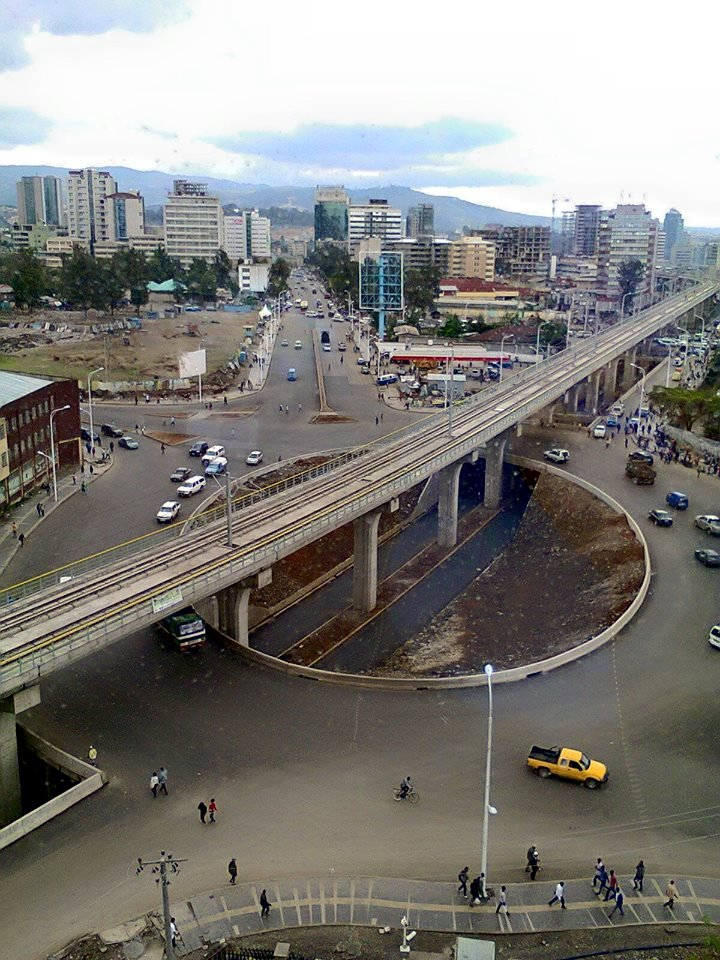
Light Rail Traffic Circle (Mexico Square)

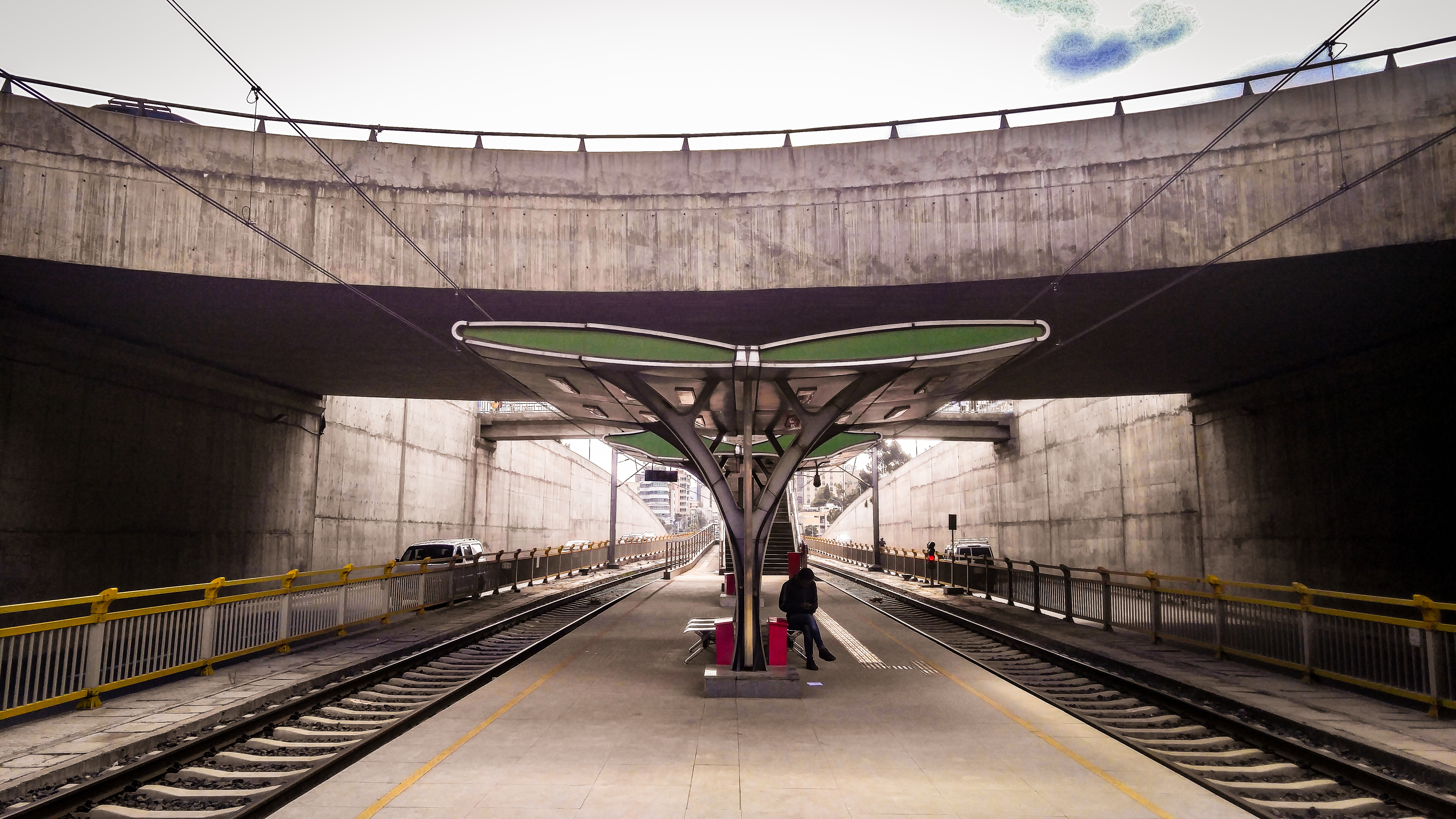
Urael Station

A light rail train pulling into and out of a station, 2018

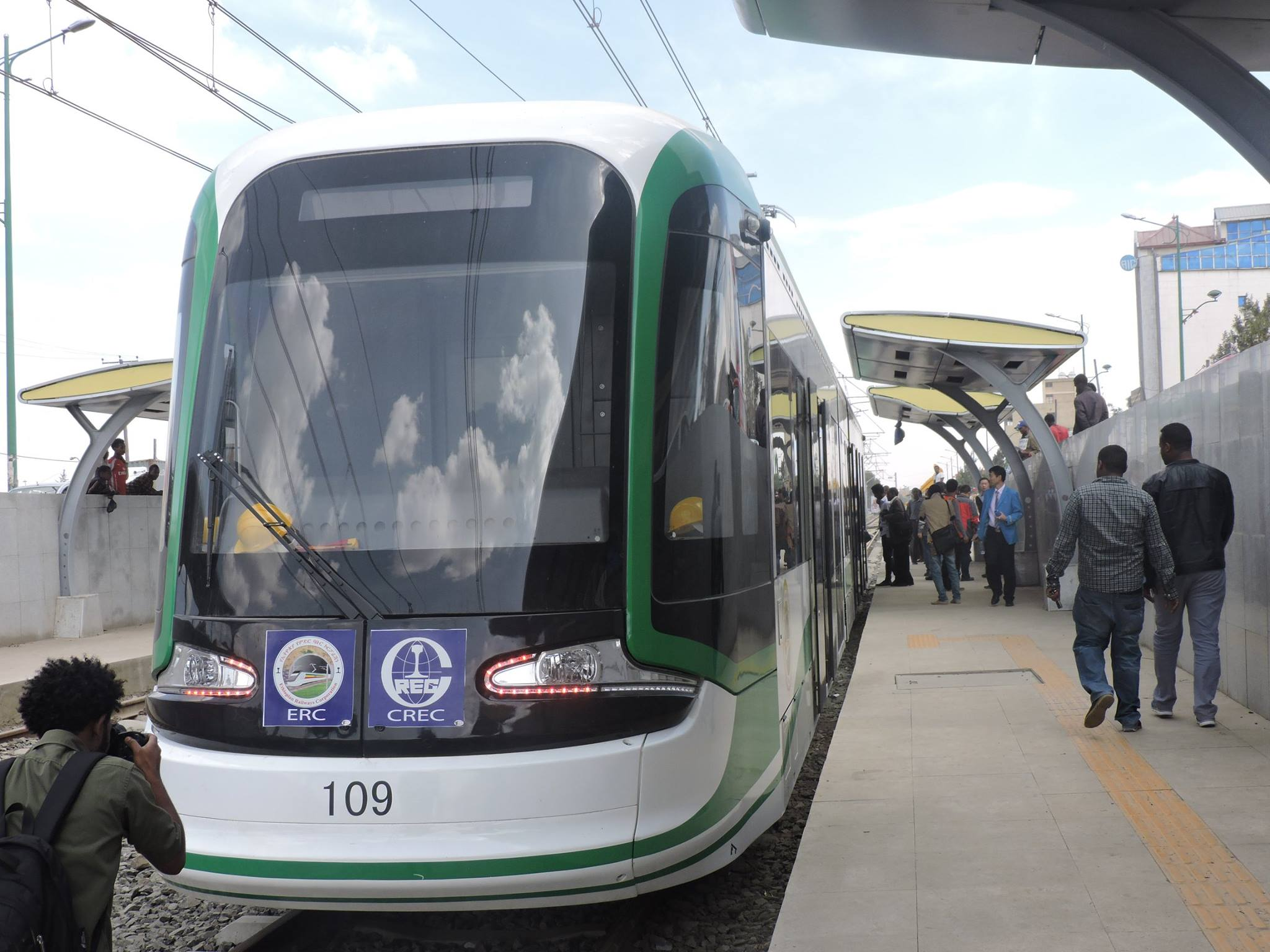
Light Rail vehicle

Of the two line rail lines, the east–west line extends 17.4 kilometres (10.8 mi), stretching from Ayat Village to Torhailoch, and passing through Megenagna, Meskel Square, Legehar and Mexico Square. The north–south line, which is 16.9 kilometres (10.5 mi) in length, passes through Menelik II Square, Merkato, Lideta, Legehar, Meskel Square, Gotera and Kaliti. However, the two lines have a common track of about 2.7 km (1.7 mi). The common track is the elevated section that runs east to west across the southern edge of the CBD from Meskel Square to Mexico Square, and onwards to Lideta. Trains on the north–south line are blue and white, whilst on the east–west line they are green and white. The Fares cost 2-6 Ethiopian birr. Tickets are bought at orange-coloured kiosks next to each station.

The final cost to build the railway was US$475m, with construction taking three years. The Addis Ababa Light Rail was originally to have a total of 41 stations on its two lines, and each train was planned to have the capacity to carry 286 passengers. This will enable the light rail transit to provide a transportation service to 15,000 passengers per hour per direction (PPHPD) and 60,000 in all four directions. The railway lines have their dedicated power grid.

According to CREC, the system carried an average of 113,500 daily passengers in January 2016 with 153,000 passengers as the highest passenger load during a single day. Service frequency was 10 minutes during peak hours on both lines and 20 minutes during off-peak hours. On average there were 94 train rotations on the Blue line (3,177.2 vehicle-kilometres) and 93 rotations on the Green line (3,236.4 vehicle-kilometres).

By 2023, the system averaged 56,000 daily passengers due to limited rolling stock availability.

== Future expansion ==
There are plans for extensions in all four directions. According to Getachew Betru, CEO of Ethiopian Railway Corporation, the Ethiopian government indicated that any new line built should be completely grade-separated. Apart from extending the existing lines, two new lines are under consideration by the Ethiopian government. The first one will start at St. George's Cathedral, pass along Mexico Square to the African Union Headquarters and will terminate at Lebu, connecting to the new national rail network. The second line will start at Megenagna Roundabout and passes via Bole Airport, Wello Sefer area, Saris market area and Jommo area and terminates at Lebu.

== Rolling stock ==
Addis Ababa Light Rail initially operated a fleet of 41 three-section 70% low-floor trams manufactured by CNR Changchun (and based on the design for Shenyang Modern Tram). By 2023, only 17 trains were in service, with the rest "inoperable due to lack of spare parts". The reasons for the low reliability of the trains are likely to be car motor overloading problems and inadequate maintenance.

By September 2024 only 15 trains were operational.

== Lines ==
=== Green Line (Line 1) ===
- Opened 9 November 2015.
- The 17.4-kilometre (10.8 mi) Green Line runs east from Ayat to Tor Hailoch, with 23 stops (including the common section). There are five planned future stops.

=== Blue Line (Line 2) ===
- Opened 20 September 2015.
- The 16.9-kilometre (10.5 mi) Blue Line runs south from Menelik Square to Kaliti with 22 stops (including the common section). There are three planned future stops.

=== Common (shared) section ===
- Opened 20 September 2015.
- The 2.7-kilometre (1.7 mi) common section runs from St. Lideta to Meskel Square, with 5 stops.

In April 2025 Green Line was operated on weekdays with 7 cars, hypothetically providing 15 min service, with total return journey runtime 105 min; while on weekends the line was operated with 6 cars, providing approximately 17 min service. Blue Line was operated on weekdays with 8 cars, providing 15 min service, with total return journey runtime 120 min; while on weekends the line was operated with 7 cars, providing approximately 17 min service. Power outages and delays are rampant, with most lasting under 1 hr. A common practice during power shortages is to operate one car at-a-time per particular power supply segment of the line, with other cars holding at stations. Total shutdowns for entire days are possible.

== See also ==
- List of tram and light rail transit systems
- List of urban rail transit systems
