= Bishoftu International Airport =

Ethiopian large-scale airport under construction

Bishoftu International Airport BIA ቢሾፍቱ
- IATA: BIA; ICAO: none

Summary
- Airport type: Public
- Operator: Ethiopian Airlines Group
- Serves: Bishoftu, Addis Ababa
- Location: Bishoftu, Oromia Region, Ethiopia
- Hub for: Ethiopian Airlines (planned)
- Elevation AMSL: 6,227 ft (1,898 m)
- Coordinates: 8°44′2.15″N 38°55′16.68″E

Maps
- Projected Airport diagram
- Interactive map of Bishoftu International Airport BIA

Bishoftu International Airport (also referred to in project documents as the Bishoftu International Airport Project or the Ethiopian Airlines Mega Airport) is an under construction large-scale airport development project in the city of Bishoftu, in the Oromia region of Ethiopia. Positioned to become a major aviation hub in Africa, the project is spearheaded by Ethiopian Airlines Group. On 10 January 2026, the project officially broke ground. It is scheduled to be completed in 2030.

== Specifications and capacity (planned) ==
Planned specifications for Bishoftu International Airport indicate a design capacity for up to 100 million passengers annually, supported by four to five parallel runways and a major expanded cargo terminal. The project also includes an Airport City with MRO facilities, a hotel, a shopping mall and an industrial park.

The initial phase of the airport, set to open in 2030 with a maximum capacity of 60 million passengers annually, consists of the X-shaped Terminal 1 headhouse and one satellite concourse connected by an underground people mover system, cargo facilities, hangar facilities for Ethiopian Airlines, a large central control tower, and two parallel runways - one on either side of the passenger terminal area.

The full masterplan for the airport facilities outlines future growth which includes two additional satellite concourses and a second "Terminal 2" headhouse opposite Terminal 1, greatly expanded cargo facilities, two additional parallel runways, and up to 270 aircraft parking spaces. As of September 2026, details of these expansions only note this growth is expected to take place between the airport's initial opening in 2030 and the year 2060.

== Financing ==
The estimated cost of the project has been reported differently at different stages of development. African Development Bank project documentation estimated the overall project cost at approximately US$10 billion, while Reuters reported a later estimate of US$12.5 billion in January 2026.

The African Development Bank was appointed as initial mandated lead arranger, global coordinator and bookrunner for the project's debt financing. The bank planned to provide up to US$500 million itself, subject to approval, and to mobilize up to US$8 billion from other lenders.

== International support ==
The United States government has expressed support for the project, acknowledging its potential to transform regional connectivity and offering U.S. expertise and investment. The African Development Bank has listed the project in its documents, indicating its involvement in the initial stages of project preparation.

== Design ==
ZHA Architects (previously Zaha Hadid Architects) has been named as the firm behind the project.

== See also ==
- Ethiopian Airlines
- Bole International Airport
- Bishoftu
