= Commander of the Ethiopian Air Force =

High-ranking officer in the Ethiopian Air Force

- Flag of Ethiopian Air Force
- Incumbent; Lieutenant General Yilma Merdasa since 21 June 2018
- Ethiopian Air Force
- Member of: Ethiopian National Defense Force
- Reports to: Chief of General Staff
- Appointer: the President of Ethiopia
- Formation: 1929
- First holder: Mischka Babichef

The Commander of the Ethiopian Air Force is the chief and highest-ranking officer of the Ethiopian Air Force The current commander is Lieutenant General Yilma Merdasa.

== List of officeholders ==
=== Ethiopian Empire (1929-1974) ===
- Mischka Babichef (1929–?)
- Colonel Hubert Julian (?–August 1935)
- Colonel John Robinson (August 1935–April 1936)
- Carl Gustaf von Rosen (1947–1962)
- Christian Nilsson (1957–1962)
- Brigadier General Asefa Ayana (1962–1967)
- Major General Abera Woldemariam Mariam (1967–1974)

=== Derg/PDRE (1974-1991) ===
- General Asefa G. Egzi (1974, 3 months)
- Brigadier General Yohannes Woldemariam (1974 – 6 December 1974)
- Brigadier General Taye Tilahun (6 December 1974 – 19 September 1977)
- Major General Fanta Belay (19 September 1977 – 1987)
- Lieutenant General Mengistu kassa (1956–)
- Major General Amha Desta (1987 – 17 May 1989)
- General Alemayehu Agonafir (1989–1992)

=== Ethiopia (1991-present) ===
- General Adem Mohammed (?–2018)
- Lieutenant General Yilma Merdasa (since 21 June 2018).
