= United Nations Special Fund =

United Nations' Agency

- Formation: 1958
- Headquarters: New York City, United States
- Website: www.un.org

The United Nations Special Fund (UNSF) is a United Nations agency. The mission for the United Nations Special Fund is to assist low income, developing countries to recover their economic development. The structure of the United Nations Special Fund secretariat was separated into three units: All the policy-making, proposal examines and supervising of the fund are controlled by the managing director. The unit needs to contact the policy with agencies which execute the policies, the United Nations Secretariat and recipients countries which require to participate in the proposal and contribute, then, it will provide them clear order about the policy after the meetings. The Bureau of operations has headquarters controlled about how to developing and planning the requests of each country's requests, then, they have to evaluate those requests, prepare for the proposal about the project, select the appropriate agencies to complete the request, at the end, they need to check and follow the request when the projects start to operation. Another important mission this unit responsible for is to negotiation between the agencies and the recipient countries. The Bureau of operations needs to develop the agreement and contact the executing agencies, recipients governments, United Nations, international organizations when there is no disagreement. The function of the unit of joint administrative services was providing supervision services to the Fund. This unit only pays the adscititious costs which are for operations.

Commemorative stamp for United Nations Special Fund

== History ==
The history of The United Nations Special Fund was a compromise result in the twelfth session of the General Assembly in 1958. There were two different opinions and proposals during the meeting. When the Americans and the British discuss the possibility of establishing a special developing fund, both the US and the UK had insisted that the level of fund they contributed will highly depend on how much they could save from the national defense spending. In order to contribute more fund, the only way to achieve this is to accept the world disarmament plan by the United Nations. However, the French representative thought that all countries rely on the funds from disarmament is unwise. French support the US and the UK to establish a special fund agency in the United Nations. Although the Soviet Union representative presented the concept that the US will not accept multilateral fund, because that will represent the untrusted on World Bank, Export-Import Bank, and other America's bank by the developing countries. Because of that, the proposal on establishing a special fund can not move on. At the last two days of the Second Committee meeting of the General Assembly, all governments reach a consensus. On December 14, 1957, the General Assembly decided to establish a special fund in the United Nations for technical assistance for developing countries instead of a capital development fund. On October 14, 1958, the vote for establishing the Special Fund started in the United Nations, at the end of the voting, there were 77 in favor, 0 opposed, and 1 abstention. Because of that, on January 1, 1959, the United Nations Special Fund officially established. After the United Nations Special Fund established, the representatives begin to discuss how to contribute and distribute the fund. The representatives of the United Nations supported the United States' proposal during the meeting and believed that they have the most efficient way to distribute the fund. Also, the United States' opinion was it is impossible to solve all the issue for one country at once. Therefore, the best way was to distribute the fund through international agencies. This could ensure all the fund will not be wasted and all used in the right place. However, the recipient countries disagree with this proposal because they believed the donor countries will introduce their political and economic system to them compulsorily. Also, the main purpose of the United Nations Special Fund is to develop economies. Overall, the order of the United Nations Special Fund is to use as the technical assistance to help countries to develop their economics and government departments. After the United Nations Special Fund was established, the early stages of the operation, the cooperation, and the development requests were heavily reliance on the length of time. Because it takes time between the Governing Council's approval to the project proposal and the signature of this request that agrees to the operation.

Theoretically, the time the Governing Council approves the proposal for the experts and equipment to arrive in the country to start of this proposal will take about six months. However, the actual time of the progress was averaged over nine months. The reason caused by this was they underestimated how much time they needed to spend to complete negotiations about individual agreements and planning of how to progress this request. Also how to organize the experts who participate in the operation, the staff from the executing agencies, and the time on delivery of the equipment the operation needs.

All those things will take a long period to complete. However, the government needs to pay the operation cost, labors, raw materials, the services fee for experts and other people who participate in the operation in local currencies. Those are all the problems that appeared during the operation, agencies in the United Nations and governments all knew those problems. However, they consider those problems as the characteristic of the decade of multilateral aid programming.

Although there are many things that could be improved, the managing director has been paying attention to the progress of implementation. There were some preparations he made that could help the project to be completed faster, such as the project experts involved in the preparation of the operation. The Special Fund has published a plan of operation, so the plan stipulates the standard of the content of individual plans to facilitate the agencies to sign the agreement and operations with the Special Fund and governments. Beyond that, the governments and the international agencies have to take responsibility for the problems, but the only thing the managing director can do is exhort. After the eighth session (January 1963), the managing director has the power to cancel the projects which not operation within one year after the United Nations Special Fund approval.

== Mission and future ==
Since the United Nations Special Funds were established in 1964, to release the pressures on the organization, they chose to liberalize the financial rules. Under the rules, the income level for the special fund largely depended on the donation level from other developed countries. The donor countries think some of the proposals are unrealistic and they have a disagreement on how the funds should be distributed. The donor nations want to make sure that the funds will not be wasted and use them to develop the economic system. Because of that, if the divergence between the donor countries and the recipient countries cannot be solved, the Special Fund system has to go through a tremendous change. If they find a way to solve the problem and have an agreement, it will face a quiet and respectable future.

== Government council ==
One member in the council believed that to solve the problems of development, they should have consistent economic policies at the international level and they should try to formulate those policies. Those policies have to focus on the long-term and comprehensive for investment activities, those policies should ensure it has positive and helpful impacts on the development part of the developing countries. Because there are various areas needs to develop. They were suggested to consider the total needs of pre-investment and all the resources required to complete this investment. This could be the first step in formulating the policies. The agencies accepted the Managing Director's suggestion and the report recommended. From January 1963, the Governing Council have to consider the ceiling of new earmarkings for every new calendar year about the level of new pledges and other resources applicable to that year. There were several members of the international agencies supported this recommendation because they understand that the total program allocations should continue to be limited to the level of current resources available to the Fund. Consider the relations between the international agencies and the Government Council, it was not a surprise that they were supporting the Council "generally supported the recommendations of the Working Group as representing a sound policy at this stage of the Fund's development," After this, they decided to use the new financial rules in the United Nations Special Fund.

On general issues relating to Special Fund activities, the representative function was provided by the Governing Council. There were only two views in the Government Council, and the two clientele: international agencies and governments, confronted each other about what subjects should use the fund. Those were controlled by the Government Council Managing Director, who has the power to determine how to deal with these two clienteles and establish his policy accordingly. Indeed, the managing director has to be sensitive enough to interpret various positions of the Council members. The success of the United Nations Special Fund is based on his ability to take responsibility for the council with his explanation.

== Area of works ==
In order to expand the United Nations' technical assistance in some basic areas, the United Nations decided to establish a special fund program on October 14, 1958. The Special Fund will focus on developing manpower, industry, agriculture, transportation, and communications, construction and housing, health, education, statistics for those countries which apply for the Special Fund. Also, this article clearly introduces the three types of agreements about Special Fund: an agreement between the Special Fund and the implementing agency; an agreement between the Special Fund and the requesting Government; and an action plan for a specific project signed by the Special Fund, the implementing agency, and the recipient government. (United Nations Special Fund. 1958) After that, the Special Fund selected 18 countries representatives from the Economic and Social Council to build up their own governing body Council. The representatives are equally selected from developed countries and developing countries.

== Agreement with government ==
This is a cooperation between the United Nations Special Fund and the Malta government. It explained what the special fund provides and how the special fund could connect to the Malta government. This agreement shows the use of the United Nations Special Fund for a country, which can develop Malta's social progress and technology, increase economic growth, and help people in Malta improve their living standards. Also, the precondition of the agreement is the government and special fund needs to have a friendly cooperation spirit. This agreement is an example to understand what area the United Nations Special Fund could help a government or country to develop.

Around 1971, the Singapore government submitted a proposal to the United Nations Special Fund. The main purpose of the proposal was to apply for a Special Fund to develop the country's urban. The proposal included Singapore's topographic information and the rough draft of the urban they want to develop. The agreement included the rough draft and the contract from the international agencies and the Singapore government. Also, the agreement motioned that this progress be based on a friendly cooperation spirit, how long this project could be done and clear duty allocation.
