= Dire Dawa Airport =

Airport in Dire Dawa, Ethiopia

Dire Dawa International Airport ድሬ ዳዋ ዓለም አቀፍ አየር ማረፊያ
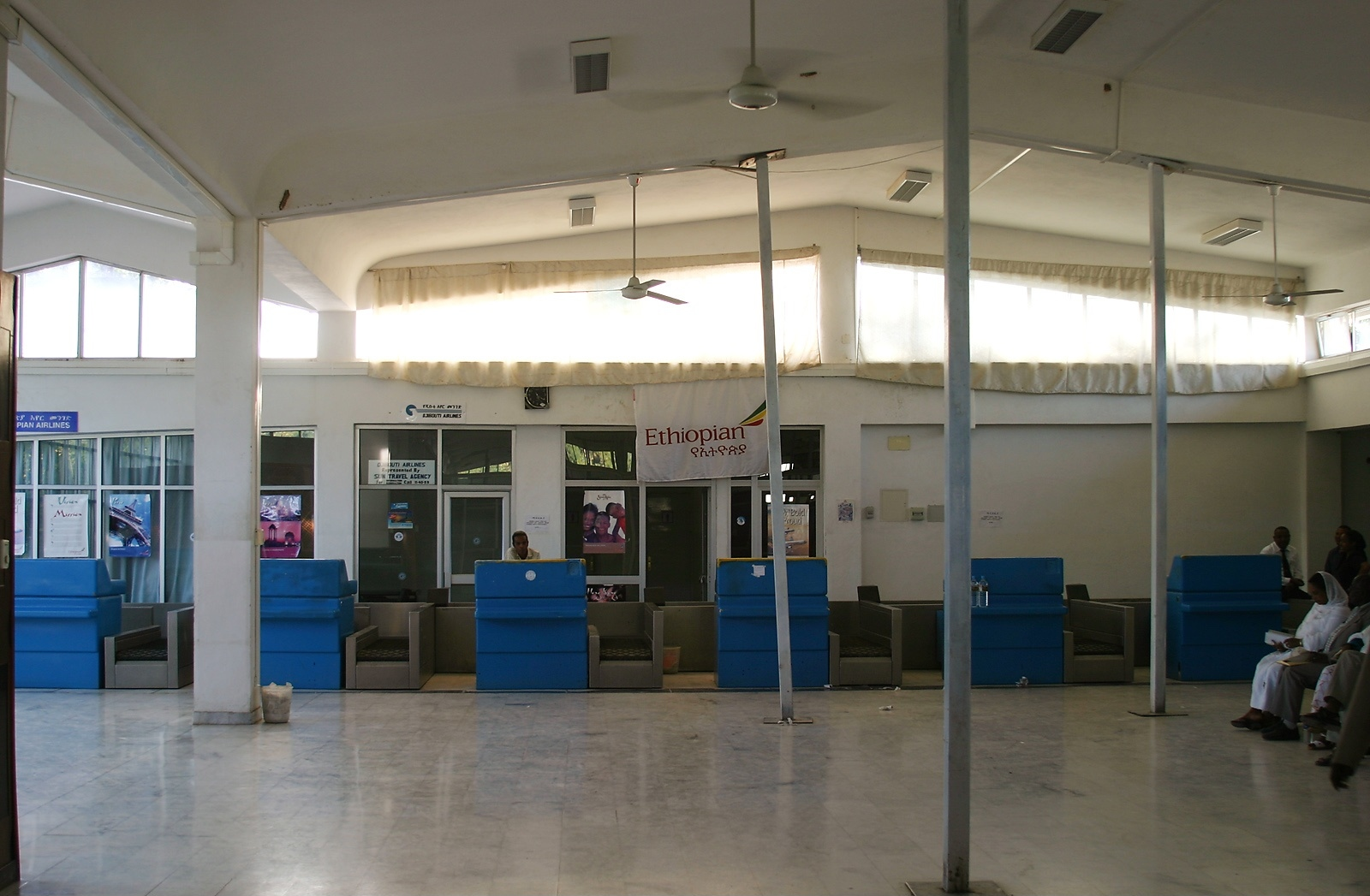
- IATA: DIR; ICAO: HADR

Summary
- Airport type: Public / Military
- Operator: Ethiopian Airports Enterprise
- Serves: Dire Dawa, Ethiopia
- Elevation AMSL: 3,829 ft (1,167 m)
- Coordinates: 09°37′28″N 041°51′15″E

Map
- Location of airport in Ethiopia

Runways
Direction	Length		Surface
Direction	m	ft	Surface
15/33	2,679	8,791	Asphalt

Dire Dawa International Airport (IATA: DIR, ICAO: HADR), is an international airport serving Dire Dawa, a city in eastern Ethiopia. It is located 5 km (3 miles) northwest of the city centre.

== Facilities ==
The airport is located at an elevation of 3,829 feet (1,167 m) above mean sea level. It has one runway designated 15/33, with an asphalt surface measuring 2,679 by 45 metres (8,789 ft × 148 ft).

== Airlines and destinations ==
Airlines	Destinations
Ethiopian Airlines	Addis Ababa, Djibouti, Gode

== Accidents and incidents ==
- On 27 August 1981, Douglas C-47B ET-AGX of RRC Air Services was written off when the port undercarriage collapsed on landing.
- On 9 January 2020, an Ethiopian Airlines Boeing 737-700 registered ET-ALN operating flight ET363 was on approach to the airport, but flew through a swarm of desert locusts that obscured visibility from the cockpit. The crew depressurized the aircraft and manually cleaned the windscreens before attempting a second approach, but were faced with the same problem. After a second depressurization and manual cleaning, the flight diverted to Addis Ababa, its origin airport.
