= Lideta Army Airport =

Airport in Addis Ababa, Ethiopia

Lideta Airport
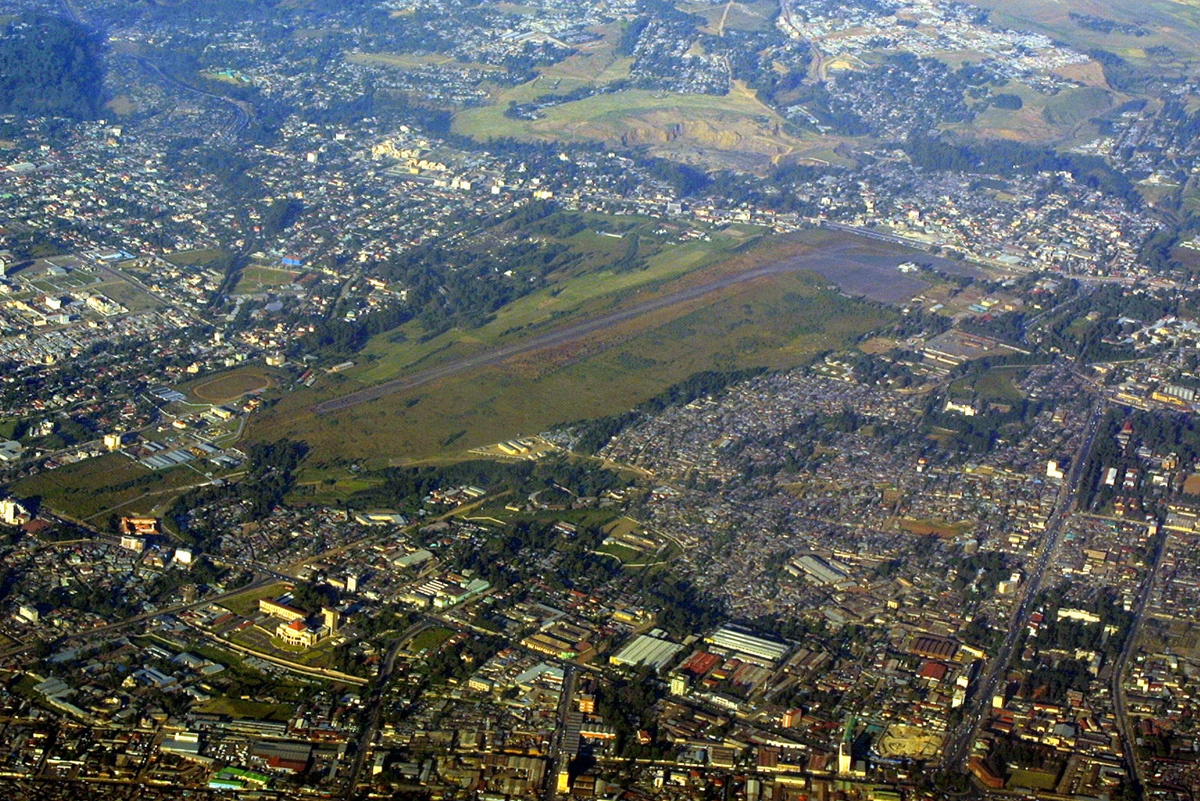
- IATA: none; ICAO: HAAL

Summary
- Airport type: Military
- Operator: Closed
- Location: Addis Ababa
- Elevation AMSL: 7,749 ft / 2,362 m
- Coordinates: 9°00′13″N 38°43′34″E

Map
- Location in Ethiopia

Runways
Direction	Length		Surface
Direction	ft	m	Surface
12/30	3,839	1,170	Asphalt
- Sources: World Aero Data

Lideta Airport (ICAO: HAAL) also colloquially known as the Old Airport (and "Ivo Oliveti" airport when inaugurated) is a decommissioned military airport located in Addis Ababa, Ethiopia.

== History ==
Before the construction of the Addis Ababa Bole International Airport, it was Lideta Airport (named after the local area, now better known as the Old Airport) that had served the nation for nearly three decades. It is located southwest of the capital city about 4.82 kilometres from the centre of the town at an elevation of 7,749 feet (2362m) above sea level with an average temperature of 25 °C. A new aerodrome named Akaki was built in the first months of 1934, clearly for the Fokker VIIs, as they were too large for the airfield at Jan Meda. In the newspaper, Courier d'Ethiopie, it is only mentioned as "aerodrome de l'Akaki" in June 1935, before that, its location is given as "Keft Meda," in the "plaine de Fourri." The new airport at Lideta was constructed on the same site and named “Ivo Oliveti” Airport by the Italians during their occupation of Ethiopia from 1936 to 1941. The Italians used the airport as an important destination served by the civilian airline, Ala Littoria. Ala Littoria was the imperial route that had already been established to link the metropolis with other colonial towns like Mogadishu and Asmara. With the Italian conquest of Ethiopia, Addis Ababa was incorporated into the imperial network, being served four times a week with the Savoia Marchetti, SM-73 airplanes. After the defeat of the Italians as well, the airport at Lideta continued to serve the nation as an international gateway and domestic hub. B.O.A.C. No.5 Line - 8 Lockheed Lodestars were first proposed to operate the route there in August 1941: Cairo (Almaza)-Port Sudan-Asmara one service weekly, rising to three weekly. Asmara-Aden-Addis Ababa two services weekly. On 1 February 1946 at 11:50 a huge crowd gathered at Lideta to watch the arrival together of six DC-3s – the first five aircraft for the brand new Ethiopian Airlines, and a sixth to transport the USAAF ferry pilots back to Cairo. Registrations were ET-T-1/5. There were joyrides over Addis Ababa on March 3 and the first scheduled international passenger service took off for Cairo at 7am on 8 April, refuelling at Asmara 10-10:30, arriving Almaza at 4:30pm.

Formerly the main air hub (created by the Italians in 1936 with the name Ivo Oliveti aeroporto) for the Addis Ababa area, in 1960, Ethiopian Airlines realised the runway at Lideta was too short for its new jet aircraft, the Boeing 720. Thus a new airport was built at Bole and Lideta was converted to function solely for Ethiopian military activities.

== Accidents and incidents ==
- 5 September 1961: An Ethiopian Airlines Douglas C-47A, registration ET-T-16, crashed south of Sendafa, shortly after takeoff from Lideta, following a propeller malfunction. Five of 19 occupants of the aircraft perished in the accident. The aircraft was due to operate a domestic non-scheduled Addis Ababa-Asmara passenger service.
- 30 November 1963: An Ethiopian Airlines Douglas C-47A, tail number ET-AAT, banked to the left on the takeoff run and swerved off the runway. There were no reported fatalities, but the aircraft was written off.

== See also ==
- List of airports in Ethiopia
