= List of Ethiopian Airlines destinations =

Ethiopian Airlines is the flag carrier of Ethiopia; it was founded as Ethiopian Air Lines on 21 December 1945. The carrier started operations on 8 April 1946, and the first scheduled destination served was Cairo via Asmara using Douglas C-47 Skytrain equipment.

The airline's hub is located at Addis Ababa Bole International Airport. Following is a list of Ethiopian Airlines' scheduled destinations. Each destination in the list below is provided with the country name, the name of the airport served, and whether it is served by passenger aircraft, cargo aircraft, or both. Terminated destinations are also listed.

== List ==
Ethiopian Airlines flies to the following destinations, as of September 2025:

Country	City	Airport	Notes	Refs
Angola	Luanda	Dr. António Agostinho Neto International Airport	Passenger	
Angola	Luanda	Quatro de Fevereiro Airport	Airport closed	
Argentina	Buenos Aires	Ministro Pistarini International Airport	Passenger	
Austria	Vienna	Vienna International Airport	Passenger	
Bahrain	Manama	Bahrain International Airport	Passenger	
Bangladesh	Dhaka	Shahjalal International Airport	Passenger	
Belgium	Brussels	Brussels Airport	Passenger + cargo	
Belgium	Liège	Liège Airport	Cargo	
Belgium	Ostend/Bruges	Ostend–Bruges International Airport	Terminated	
Benin	Cotonou	Cadjehoun Airport	Passenger	
Botswana	Gaborone	Sir Seretse Khama International Airport	Passenger	
Botswana	Maun	Maun Airport	Passenger	
Brazil	Rio de Janeiro	Rio de Janeiro/Galeão International Airport	Terminated	
Brazil	São Paulo	São Paulo/Guarulhos International Airport	Passenger + cargo	
Burkina Faso	Ouagadougou	Ouagadougou Airport	Passenger	
Burundi	Bujumbura	Bujumbura International Airport	Passenger + cargo	
Cameroon	Douala	Douala International Airport	Passenger	
Cameroon	Garoua	Garoua International Airport	Passenger	
Cameroon	Yaoundé	Yaoundé Nsimalen International Airport	Passenger	
Canada	Toronto	Toronto Pearson International Airport	Passenger	
Central African Republic	Bangui	Bangui M'Poko International Airport	Passenger	
Chad	Ndjamena	N'Djamena International Airport	Passenger	
Chile	Santiago	Arturo Merino Benítez International Airport	Cargo	
China	Beijing	Beijing Capital International Airport	Passenger	
China	Chengdu	Chengdu Shuangliu International Airport	Terminated	
China	Chengdu	Chengdu Tianfu International Airport	Passenger	
China	Chongqing	Chongqing Jiangbei International Airport	Cargo	
China	Guangzhou	Guangzhou Baiyun International Airport	Passenger + cargo	
China	Hangzhou	Hangzhou Xiaoshan International Airport	Terminated	
China	Nanjing	Nanjing Lukou International Airport	Cargo	
China	Shanghai	Shanghai Pudong International Airport	Passenger	
China	Shenzhen	Shenzhen Bao'an International Airport	Cargo	
China	Ürümqi	Ürümqi Diwopu International Airport	Cargo	
China	Xiamen	Xiamen Gaoqi International Airport	Cargo	
Colombia	Bogotá	El Dorado International Airport	Cargo	
Comoros	Moroni	Prince Said Ibrahim International Airport	Passenger	
Côte d'Ivoire	Abidjan	Félix-Houphouët-Boigny International Airport	Passenger	
Cyprus	Larnaca	Larnaca International Airport	Terminated	
Democratic Republic of Congo	Goma	Goma International Airport	Passenger	
Democratic Republic of Congo	Kinshasa	N'djili Airport	Passenger + cargo	
Democratic Republic of Congo	Lubumbashi	Lubumbashi International Airport	Passenger	
Denmark	Copenhagen	Copenhagen Airport	Passenger	
Djibouti	Djibouti City	Djibouti–Ambouli International Airport	Passenger + cargo	
Egypt	Cairo	Cairo International Airport	Passenger + cargo	
Eritrea	Asmara	Asmara International Airport	Terminated	
Eritrea	Assab	Assab International Airport	Terminated	
Eritrea	Massawa	Massawa International Airport	Terminated	
Eritrea	Teseney	Teseney Airport	Terminated	
Equatorial Guinea	Malabo	Malabo International Airport	Passenger	
Ethiopia	Addis Ababa	Addis Ababa Bole International Airport	Hub	
Ethiopia	Arba Minch	Arba Minch Airport	Passenger	
Ethiopia	Asosa	Asosa Airport	Passenger	
Ethiopia	Axum	Axum Airport	Passenger	
Ethiopia	Awasa	Awasa Airport	Passenger	
Ethiopia	Baco/Jinka	Baco Airport	Terminated	
Ethiopia	Bahar Dar	Bahir Dar Airport	Passenger	
Ethiopia	Beica	Beica Airport	Terminated	
Ethiopia	Bulchi	Bulchi Airport	Terminated	
Ethiopia	Buno Bedele	Bedele Airport	Terminated	
Ethiopia	Debre Markos	Debre Markos Airport	Passenger	
Ethiopia	Debre Tabor	Debre Tabor Airport	Terminated	
Ethiopia	Dembidolo	Dembidolo Airport	Passenger	
Ethiopia	Dessie	Combolcha Airport	Passenger	
Ethiopia	Dire Dawa	Dire Dawa Airport	Passenger	
Ethiopia	Dodollo	Dodola Airport	Terminated	
Ethiopia	Gambela	Gambela Airport	Passenger	
Ethiopia	Gimbi	Gimbi Airport	Terminated	
Ethiopia	Ginir	Ghinnir Airport	Terminated	
Ethiopia	Goba	Robe Airport	Passenger	
Ethiopia	Gode	Gode Airport	Passenger	
Ethiopia	Gondar	Gondar Airport	Suspended	
Ethiopia	Gore	Gore Airport	Passenger	
Ethiopia	Humera	Humera Airport	Passenger	
Ethiopia	Jijiga	Jijiga Airport	Passenger	
Ethiopia	Jimma	Aba Segud Airport	Passenger	
Ethiopia	Kebri Dahar	Kabri Dar Airport	Passenger	
Ethiopia	Lalibela	Lalibela Airport	Suspended	
Ethiopia	Lekempti	Nekemte Airport	Terminated	
Ethiopia	Mekele	Alula Aba Airport	Passenger	
Ethiopia	Maji	Tum Airport	Terminated	
Ethiopia	Mekane Selam	Mekane Selam Airport	Terminated	
Ethiopia	Mendi	Mendi Airport	Terminated	
Ethiopia	Mizan Teferi	Mizan Teferi Airport	Terminated	
Ethiopia	Mota	Mota Airport	Terminated	
Ethiopia	Negele Borana	Neghelle Airport	Passenger	
Ethiopia	Nejo	Nejjo Airport	Terminated	
Ethiopia	Semera	Semera Airport	Passenger	
Ethiopia	Sheikh Hussein	Sheikh Hussein Airport	Terminated	
Ethiopia	Shilavo	Shilavo Airport	Terminated	
Ethiopia	Shire	Shire Airport	Terminated	
Ethiopia	Soddu	Sodo Airport	Terminated	
Ethiopia	Tippi	Tippi Airport	Terminated	
Ethiopia	Tum	Tum Airport	Terminated	
Ethiopia	Yabelo	Yabelo Airport	Passenger	
Ethiopia	Wacca	Wacca Airport	Terminated	
France	Lyon	Lyon–Saint-Exupéry Airport	Passenger	
France	Marseille	Marseille Provence Airport	Passenger	
France	Paris	Charles de Gaulle Airport	Passenger	
Gabon	Libreville	Libreville International Airport	Passenger	
Germany	Berlin	Berlin Tegel Airport	Airport closed	
Germany	Frankfurt	Frankfurt Airport	Passenger	
Ghana	Accra	Accra International Airport	Passenger + cargo	
Greece	Athens	Athens International Airport	Passenger	
Greece	Athens	Ellinikon International Airport	Airport closed	
Guinea	Conakry	Conakry International Airport	Passenger	
Hong Kong	Hong Kong	Hong Kong International Airport	Passenger + cargo	
India	Ahmedabad	Ahmedabad Airport	Cargo	
India	Bangalore	Kempegowda International Airport	Passenger + cargo	
India	Chennai	Chennai International Airport	Passenger + cargo	
India	Delhi	Indira Gandhi International Airport	Passenger + cargo	
India	Hyderabad	Rajiv Gandhi International Airport	Passenger + cargo	
India	Mumbai	Chhatrapati Shivaji Maharaj International Airport	Passenger + cargo	
Indonesia	Jakarta	Soekarno–Hatta International Airport	Passenger	
Ireland	Dublin	Dublin Airport	Passenger	
Israel	Tel Aviv	Ben Gurion Airport	Passenger	
Italy	Milan	Milan Malpensa Airport	Passenger + cargo	
Italy	Rome	Leonardo da Vinci–Fiumicino Airport	Passenger	
Japan	Tokyo	Narita International Airport	Passenger	
Jordan	Amman	Queen Alia International Airport	Passenger	
Kenya	Mombasa	Moi International Airport	Passenger	
Kenya	Nairobi	Jomo Kenyatta International Airport	Passenger + cargo	
Kuwait	Kuwait City	Kuwait International Airport	Passenger + cargo	
Lebanon	Beirut	Beirut–Rafic Hariri International Airport	Passenger	
Liberia	Monrovia	Roberts International Airport	Passenger	
Luxembourg	Luxembourg	Luxembourg Airport	Terminated	
Madagascar	Antananarivo	Ivato International Airport	Passenger	
Madagascar	Nosy Be	Fascene Airport	Passenger	
Malaysia	Kuala Lumpur	Kuala Lumpur International Airport	Passenger	
Malawi	Blantyre	Chileka International Airport	Passenger	
Malawi	Lilongwe	Lilongwe International Airport	Passenger	
Mali	Bamako	Senou International Airport	Passenger	
Mexico	Mexico City	Felipe Ángeles International Airport	Cargo	
Mexico	Mexico City	Mexico City International Airport	Terminated	
Mozambique	Beira	Beira Airport	Passenger	
Mozambique	Maputo	Maputo International Airport	Passenger	
Namibia	Windhoek	Hosea Kutako International Airport	Passenger	
Netherlands	Amsterdam	Amsterdam Airport Schiphol	Terminated	
Netherlands	Maastricht/Beek	Maastricht Aachen Airport	Terminated	
Niger	Niamey	Diori Hamani International Airport	Passenger	
Nigeria	Abuja	Nnamdi Azikiwe International Airport	Passenger	
Nigeria	Enugu	Akanu Ibiam International Airport	Passenger + cargo	
Nigeria	Kaduna	Kaduna International Airport	Terminated	
Nigeria	Kano	Mallam Aminu Kano International Airport	Passenger + cargo	
Nigeria	Lagos	Murtala Mohammed International Airport	Passenger + cargo	
Norway	Oslo	Oslo Airport, Gardermoen	Passenger + cargo	
Oman	Muscat	Muscat International Airport	Passenger	
Pakistan	Karachi	Jinnah International Airport	Passenger	
Philippines	Manila	Ninoy Aquino International Airport	Passenger	
Poland	Warsaw	Warsaw Chopin Airport	Passenger	
Portugal	Lisbon	Lisbon Airport	Terminated	
Portugal	Porto	Porto Airport	Passenger	
Qatar	Doha	Hamad International Airport	Passenger	
Republic of Congo	Brazzaville	Maya-Maya Airport	Passenger + cargo	
Republic of Congo	Pointe-Noire	Pointe-Noire Airport	Passenger	
Russia	Moscow	Moscow Domodedovo Airport	Passenger	
Rwanda	Kigali	Kigali International Airport	Passenger + cargo	
Saudi Arabia	Dammam	King Fahd International Airport	Passenger	
Saudi Arabia	Jizan	King Abdullah International Airport	Passenger	
Saudi Arabia	Dhahran	Dhahran International Airport	Airport closed	
Saudi Arabia	Jeddah	King Abdulaziz International Airport	Passenger + cargo	
Saudi Arabia	Riyadh	King Khalid International Airport	Passenger + cargo	
Senegal	Dakar	Blaise Diagne International Airport	Passenger	
Seychelles	Mahe	Seychelles International Airport	Passenger	
Singapore	Singapore	Changi Airport	Passenger	
Somalia	Berbera (Note: The city is located in Somaliland, a self-declared sovereign state that is internationally recognised as an autonomous region of Somalia.)	Berbera Airport	Terminated	
Somalia	Bosaso	Bosaso Airport	Passenger	
Somalia	Garowe	Garowe Airport	Passenger	
Somalia	Hargeisa	Hargeisa Airport	Passenger	
Somalia	Mogadishu	Aden Adde International Airport	Passenger	
South Africa	Cape Town	Cape Town International Airport	Passenger	
South Africa	Durban	King Shaka International Airport	Resumes 11 December 2026	
South Africa	Johannesburg	O. R. Tambo International Airport	Passenger + cargo	
South Korea	Seoul	Incheon International Airport	Passenger + cargo	
South Sudan	Juba	Juba Airport	Passenger + cargo	
South Sudan	Malakal	Malakal Airport	Terminated	
Spain	Barcelona	Josep Tarradellas Barcelona–El Prat Airport	Terminated	
Spain	Madrid	Madrid–Barajas Airport	Passenger	
Spain	Zaragoza	Zaragoza Airport	Cargo	
Sudan	Khartoum	Khartoum International Airport	Passenger	
Sudan	Port Sudan	Port Sudan New International Airport	Terminated	
Sudan	Wadi Halfa	Wadi Halfa Airport	Terminated	
Sweden	Stockholm	Stockholm Arlanda Airport	Passenger	
Switzerland	Geneva	Geneva Airport	Passenger	
Switzerland	Zurich	Zurich Airport	Passenger	
Tanzania	Dar es Salaam	Julius Nyerere International Airport	Passenger	
Tanzania	Kilimanjaro	Kilimanjaro International Airport	Passenger	
Tanzania	Zanzibar	Abeid Amani Karume International Airport	Passenger	
Thailand	Bangkok	Suvarnabhumi International Airport	Passenger	
Togo	Lomé	Lomé–Tokoin International Airport	Passenger + cargo	
Turkey	Istanbul	Atatürk Airport	Terminated	
Turkey	Istanbul	Istanbul Airport	Passenger + cargo	
Uganda	Entebbe/Kampala	Entebbe International Airport	Passenger + cargo	
United Arab Emirates	Abu Dhabi	Abu Dhabi International Airport	Passenger	
United Arab Emirates	Dubai	Dubai International Airport	Passenger + cargo	
United Kingdom	London	Gatwick Airport	Passenger	
United Kingdom	London	Heathrow Airport	Passenger	
United Kingdom	Manchester	Manchester Airport	Passenger	
United States	Atlanta	Hartsfield–Jackson Atlanta International Airport	Passenger	
United States	Chicago	O'Hare International Airport	Passenger	
United States	Houston	George Bush Intercontinental Airport	Terminated	
United States	Los Angeles	Los Angeles International Airport	Terminated	
United States	Miami	Miami International Airport	Cargo	
United States	Newark	Newark Liberty International Airport	Passenger	
United States	New York City	John F. Kennedy International Airport	Passenger	
United States	Washington, D.C.	Dulles International Airport	Passenger	
Vietnam	Hanoi	Noi Bai International Airport	Passenger	
Yemen	Aden	Aden International Airport	Terminated	
Yemen	Hodeidah	Hodeidah International Airport	Terminated	
Yemen	Sanaa	Sanaa International Airport	Terminated	
Yemen	Taiz	Taiz International Airport	Terminated	
Zambia	Livingstone	Harry Mwanga Nkumbula International Airport	Passenger	
Zambia	Lusaka	Lusaka International Airport	Passenger + cargo	
Zambia	Ndola	Ndola Airport	Passenger	
Zimbabwe	Harare	Robert Gabriel Mugabe International Airport	Passenger	
Zimbabwe	Victoria Falls	Victoria Falls Airport	Passenger	

== See also ==
- Transport in Ethiopia

== Bibliography ==
- Guttery, Ben R. (1998). Encyclopedia of African Airlines. Jefferson, NC: McFarland & Company. ISBN 978-0-7864-0495-7.
