= List of airports in Ethiopia =

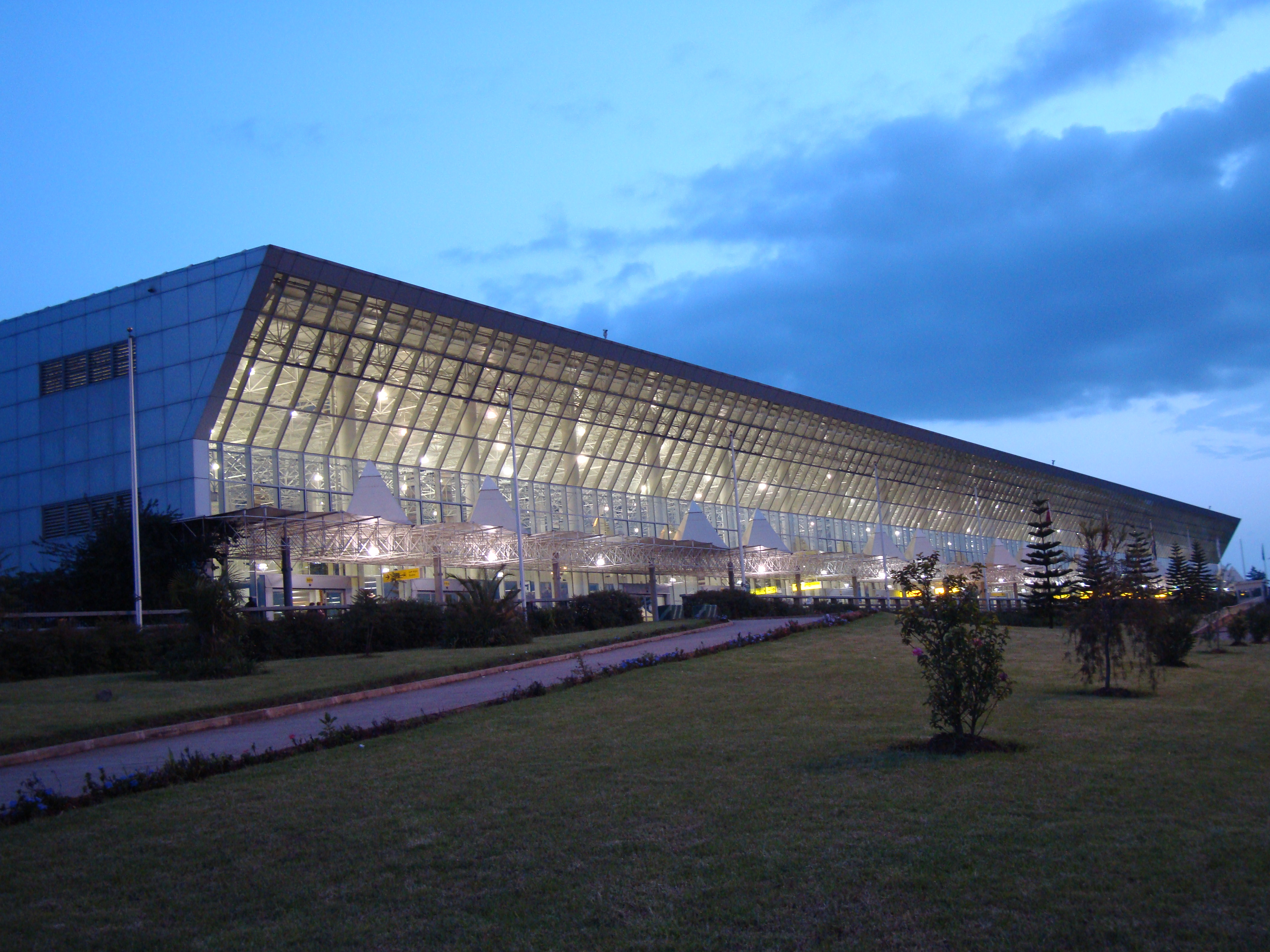
Addis Ababa Bole International Airport

This is a list of airports in Ethiopia, grouped by type and sorted by location.

Transport in Ethiopia is overseen by the Ministry of Transport and Communications.

In December 2024, it was reported that Ethiopia will be constructing a new airport worth US$6 billion near its capital Addis Ababa. The airport will be Africa's largest and busiest airport and is designed to serve 100 million passengers annually.

== Airports ==
Airport names shown in bold indicate the airport has scheduled service on commercial airlines.

City served	Region	ICAO	IATA	Airport name
**Public airports**
Addis Ababa	Addis Ababa	HAAB	ADD	**Addis Ababa Bole International Airport**
Arba Minch (Arba Mintch)	SNNPR	HAAM	AMH	**Arba Minch Airport**
Asosa (Assosa)	Benishangul-Gumuz	HASO	ASO	**Asosa Airport**
Awasa (Awassa)	Sidama	HALA	AWA	**Awasa Airport**
Axum (Aksum)	Tigray	HAAX	AXU	**Axum Airport**
Bahir Dar (Bahar Dar)	Amhara	HABD	BJR	**Bahir Dar Airport**
Beica (Bega)	Oromia	HABE	BEI	Beica Airport
Combolcha (Kombolcha) / Dessie	Amhara	HADC	DSE	**Kombolcha Airport**
Dansha	Tigray	HADA		Dansha Airport
Debre Marqos	Amhara	HADM	DBM	Debre Marqos Airport
Debre Tabor	Amhara	HADT	DBT	Debre Tabor Airport
Dembidolo	Oromia	HADD	DEM	**Dembidolo Airport**
Dire Dawa	Dire Dawa	HADR	DIR	**Dire Dawa International Airport**
Dodola	Oromia	HADO		Dodola Airport
Dolo	Somali			Dolo Airport
Fincha (Finicha'a)	Oromia	HAFN	FNH	Fincha Airport
Gambela (Gambella)	Gambela	HAGM	GMB	**Gambela Airport**
Ghinnir (Ginir)	Oromia	HAGH	GNN	Ghinnir Airport
Goba / Robe	Oromia	HAGB	GOB	**Robe Airport** (Gobe Airport)
Gode	Somali	HAGO	GDE	**Ugas Mirad Airport**
Gondar (Gonder)	Amhara	HAGN	GDQ	**Gondar Airport**
Gore	Oromia	HAGR	GOR	Gore Airport
Humera (Himera, Himora)	Tigray	HAHU	HUE	**Humera Airport**
Jijiga	Somali	HAJJ	JIJ	**Jijiga Gerad Wilwal Airport**
Jimma	Oromia	HAJM	JIM	**Aba Segud Airport** (Jimma Airport)
Jinka (formerly Baco)	SNNPR	HABC	BCO	**Jinka Airport** (Baco Airport)
Kabri Dar (Kebri Dahar)	Somali	HAKD	ABK	Kabri Dar Airport
Lalibela	Amhara	HALL	LLI	**Lalibela Airport**
Maji	SNNPR	HAMJ	TUJ	Tum Airport
Makale (Mekele, Mek'ele)	Tigray	HAMK	MQX	**Alula Aba Nega Airport** (Makale Airport)
Mekane Selam	Amhara	HAMA	MKS	Mekane Selam Airport
Mendi	Oromia	HAMN	NDM	Mendi Airport
Metema (Metemma)	Amhara	HAMM	ETE	Genda Wuha Airport
Mizan Teferi	SNNPR	HAMT	MTF	Mizan Teferi Airport
Mui	SNNPR	HAMR	MUJ	Mui Airport
Nejo	Oromia	HANJ	NEJ	Nejjo Airport
Nekemte	Oromia	HANK	NEK	**Nekemte Airport**
Semera	Afar	HASM	SZE	**Semera Airport**
Shakiso	Oromia	HASK	SKR	Shakiso Airport
Shilavo	Somali	HASL	HIL	Shilavo Airport
Shire	Tigray		SHC	**Shire Airport**
Sodo	SNNPR	HASD	SXU	Sodo Airport
Tippi (Tepi)	SNNPR	HATP	TIE	Tippi Airport
Wacca	SNNPR	HAWC	WAC	Wacca Airport
**Military airports**
Addis Ababa	Addis Ababa	HAAL		Lideta Army Airport
Bishoftu	Oromia	HAHM	QHR	Harar Meda Airport
Neghelle (Negele Boran)	Oromia	HANG	EGL	Neghelle Airport
**Under construction**
Bishoftu/Addis Ababa	Oromia			Bishoftu International Airport

== See also ==
- Transport in Ethiopia
- Ethiopian Air Force
- List of airports by ICAO code: H#HA - Ethiopia
- Wikipedia: WikiProject Aviation/Airline destination lists: Africa#Ethiopia
