= Ethiopian Airlines accidents and incidents =

Ethiopian Airlines, the national airline of Ethiopia, has a good safety record. As of March 2019, the Aviation Safety Network records 64 accidents/incidents for Ethiopian Airlines that total 459 fatalities since 1965, plus six accidents for Ethiopian Air Lines, the airline's former name. Since July 1948, the company wrote off 36 aircraft, including three Boeing 707s, three Boeing 737s, one Boeing 767, two Douglas DC-3s, two Douglas DC-6, one de Havilland Canada DHC-5 Buffalo, two de Havilland Canada DHC-6 Twin Otters, 21 subtypes of the Douglas C-47, one Lockheed L-749 Constellation and one Lockheed L-100 Hercules.

Ethiopian's deadliest aircraft incident took place on 10 March 2019, when a Boeing 737 MAX 8, barely four months old, crashed shortly after takeoff en route from Addis Ababa to Nairobi; all 157 people on board perished. Until then, the airline's most infamous accident occurred on 23 November 1996, when a hijacked Boeing 767-200ER crashed into the Indian Ocean off the coast of the Comoros Islands due to fuel starvation, killing 125 of the 175 passengers and crew on board. The third-deadliest accident took place in January 2010 and involved a Boeing 737-800 that had just departed Beirut–Rafic Hariri International Airport and crashed into the Mediterranean Sea, off the coast of Lebanon; there were 90 people on board, of whom none survived. The crash of a Boeing 737-200 at Bahir Dar Airport in September 1988 ranks as the carrier's fourth-deadliest accident, with 35 fatalities, out of the 104 people on board.

Following is a list of accidents and incidents involving Ethiopian Airlines aircraft. It includes hijackings, events involving fatalities and/or events causing damage beyond repair to the aircraft.

== List ==
^{†}	Events for Ethiopian Air Lines
^{‡}	Events for Ethiopian Airlines

Date	Location	Aircraft	Tail number	Aircraft damage	Fatalities	Description of the event	Refs
22 July 1948 ^{†}	Gore	Douglas C-47A	ET-T-5	W/O	0	Overran the wet runway at Gore Airport.	
10 July 1957 ^{†}	Off Khartoum	L-749 Constellation	ET-T-35	W/O	0/20	The aircraft belly landed just after it departed from Khartoum Airport, 49 kilometres (30 mi) away from the city. Due to operate the second leg of an international scheduled Athens–Khartoum–Addis Ababa passenger service as Flight 3.	
15 July 1960 ^{†}	Off Jimma	Douglas C-47A	ET-T-18	W/O	1/11	Crashed into mountainous terrain 27.5 kilometres (17.1 mi) south of Jimma. The aircraft was flying the Bulchi–Jimma route as Flight 372.	
5 September 1961 ^{†}	Sendafar	Douglas C-47A	ET-T-16	W/O	5/19	Crashed south of Sendafa, following an engine malfunction while en route a domestic non-scheduled Addis Ababa–Asmara passenger service.	
13 January 1962 ^{†}	Tippi	Douglas C-47A	ET-T-1	W/O	6	Swerved off the runway on the take-off run at Tippi Airport, and ran into a mill. Five people on board lost their lives in the accident, plus one more on the ground. The aircraft was due to operate a domestic scheduled Tippi–Jimma passenger service.	
30 November 1963 ^{†}	Addis Ababa	Douglas C-47A	ET-AAT	W/O	0/3	During a test flight, the aircraft banked to the left on the takeoff run at Lideta Airfield, swerving off the runway.	
14 September 1965 ^{‡}	Gore	Douglas C-47A	ET-ABI	W/O	17/17	Crashed when attempting to land in Gore Airport.	
10 April 1969 ^{‡}	Suez	Douglas C-47A	ET-AAQ	W/O	3/3	Was operating an Asmara International Airport–Cairo International Airport cargo flight on behalf of United Arab Airlines when it was shot down 3 kilometres (1.9 mi) south of Suez while flying over a prohibited area.	
13 September 1969 ^{‡}	Aden	DC-6	Unknown	None	1/44	An Eritrean hijacker was shot on board by an Ethiopian security official. The aircraft was en route a scheduled flight from Addis Ababa-Haile Selassie I Airport to Djibouti-Ambouli Airport, when three Eritrean hijackers belonging to the Eritrean Liberation Front hijacked the plane and forced the crew to fly to Aden International Airport. The hijackers were arrested after landing in Aden. The one shot perished later from the injuries he received.	
12 December 1969 ^{‡}	Athens	Boeing 707	Unknown	None	2/23	A Yemeni hijacker entered the cockpit shortly after departing from Madrid to Rome, and demanded the pilots to head to Aden. The hijacker was shot dead by an official security, and later another hijacker was also shot dead at the rear of the aircraft. The plane landed safely in Athens.	
12 March 1970 ^{‡}	Asmara	DC-6B	ET-AAY	W/O	0/4	Caught fire after overrunning the runway on landing at Asmara International Airport.	
10 September 1972 ^{‡}	Gondar	Douglas C-47D	ET-ABQ	W/O	11/11	Crashed near Gondar when one wing separated from the fuselage. The aircraft was some 35 minutes into the flight, operating a domestic scheduled Axum–Gondar passenger service.	
8 December 1972 ^{‡}	Addis Ababa	Boeing 720B	Unknown	Repaired	7/94	Seven Eritrean hijackers belonging to the Eritrean Liberation Front attempted to hijack Flight 708 on its first leg, en route a scheduled Addis Ababa–Asmara–Athens–Rome–Paris flight. After a grenade was activated while security officials opened fire at the hijackers, it exploded and damaged the rudder controls. The pilots managed to land the aircraft safely at Addis Ababa. Neither the passengers nor the crew were harmed, but the aircraft sustained substantial damage. Six of the hijackers were shot dead on board, while the remaining one died in a hospital. The aircraft was later repaired.	
5 August 1974 ^{‡}	Mota	Douglas C-47B	ET-ABE	W/O	0	Overshot the runway on landing at Mota Airport.	
20 November 1974 ^{‡}	Sodo	Douglas C-47A	ET-AAR	W/O	2/24	Crashed on take-off from Sodo airport. Both the pilot and the copilot were killed, while 10 of the 21 passengers were injured. Due to operate a domestic scheduled Sodo–Beica passenger service.	
14 March 1975 ^{‡}	Lalibela	Douglas C-47D	ET-ABR	W/O	1	Crashed when it was shot by rebels during landing at Lalibela Airport.	
11 September 1975 ^{‡}	Mota	Douglas C-47D	ET-ABX	W/O	1/9	Crashed into Mount Choqa after the tail hit a tree on a steep climb, while it was operating a domestic scheduled passenger flight from Bahir Dar Airport to Debre Marqos Airport.	
13 October 1976 ^{‡}	Asmara	DC-6B	ET-AAZ	W/O	0	Suffered severe damage on the right main gear on take-off at Asmara International Airport.	
14 December 1976 ^{‡}	Oborso	Douglas C-47B	ET-AEJ	W/O	0/8	Following the collapse of the right main gear during landing at Oborso Airport, the pilots retracted the gears, and the aircraft continued on its belly until it collided with an anthill.	
25 April 1977 ^{‡}	Unknown	DC-3	Unknown	Unknown	3	Hijacked on a domestic flight from Mek'ele to Gondar.	
20 July 1977 ^{‡}	Tubo Milkie	DC-3	ET-ABF	W/O	5/5	Crashed into a mountain near Tubo Milkie on approach to Jimma Airport.	
19 November 1977 ^{‡}	Rome	Boeing 707-320C	ET-ACD	W/O	5/5	Hit tree tops seconds after departing from Rome-Fiumicino Airport and crashed.	
12 June 1977 ^{‡}	Kabri Dar	Douglas C-47A	ET-AAP	W/O	0	Left main undercarriage collapsed upon landing at Kabri Dar Airport.	
15 October 1978 ^{‡}	Sodo	Douglas C-47B	ET-AGK	W/O	0/32	Engines were cut off upon touchdown at Sodo Airport, following a loss of hydraulic pressure. The airplane ended up in a drainage ditch.	
25 October 1978 ^{‡}	Degahbur	Douglas C-47A	ET-AGQ	W/O	0/13	The aircraft was operating a cargo service when it ground-looped upon landing at Degahbur Airport, after deceleration failed, hitting a drainage ditch, and causing the left main gear to collapse.	
28 January 1979 ^{‡}	Haykota	Douglas C-47B	ET-AGP	W/O	3	Crashed under unspecified circumstances.	
19 February 1979 ^{‡}	Barentu	Douglas C-47B	ET-AFW	W/O	5/5	Crashed following an inflight explosion of a bomb.	
18 March 1980 ^{‡}	Addis Ababa	Douglas C-47B	ET-AGM	W/O	0/3	Crashed on approach to Bole International Airport after hitting the roof of a house when descending too fast due to a feathered propeller. The aircraft was performing a training flight.	
11 January 1981 ^{‡}	Bahir Dar	Douglas C-47A	ET-AGW	W/O	0	Experienced the collapse of its port main undercarriage on landing at Bahir Dar Airport. The airplane was operating a freighter service.	
7 October 1981 ^{‡}	Dessie	Douglas C-47A	ET-AHR	W/O	0	The main landing gear resulted damaged during landing at Combolcha Airport. The aircraft was written off two months later after it was struck by a crashing helicopter.	
22 August 1982 ^{‡}	Mek'ele	DC-3	ET-AHP	W/O	0	Crashed on takeoff from Alula Aba Airport due to a flat tyre.	
22 June 1986 ^{‡}	Dembidolo	Twin Otter 300	ET-AIQ	W/O	0/20	The aircraft was operating a domestic scheduled Bole International Airport–Dembidolo Airport passenger service, when it struck trees on approach to the airport of destination, and crashed.	
15 September 1988 ^{‡}	Bahir Dar	Boeing 737-200	ET-AJA	W/O	35/104	Both engines ingested pigeons during take-off. The aircraft made a belly landing at the departing airport, and caught fire. Due to operate a Bahir Dar Airport–Asmara International Airport scheduled flight as Flight 604.	
8 November 1988 ^{‡}	Gondar	DHC-5 Buffalo	ET-AHI	W/O	1	Following take-off from Gondar Airport, the main gear did not retract. An attempt to land ended up with the aircraft touching down 400 m (1,300 ft) ahead of the end of the runway. The aircraft came to rest after rolling almost 1,000 m (3,300 ft). The nose gear collapsed and a fire broke out on an engine.	
25 July 1990 ^{‡}	Addis Ababa	Boeing 707-320C	ET-ACQ	W/O	0/4	Aborted take-off after birdstrike during the take-off run. Due to operate a scheduled Addis Ababa–Asmara freighter service.	
25 March 1991 ^{‡}	Asmara	Boeing 707-320C	ET-AJZ	W/O	0 (Note: There were fatalities among people who were loading the aircraft.)/0	Destroyed by rebels at Asmara International Airport.	
17 September 1991 ^{‡}	Mount Arey	L-100-30	ET-AJL	W/O	4/4	A problem with the nosegear prompted the crew to return to Djibouti. The aircraft crashed into mountainous terrain when the descent was initiated too soon.	
12 March 1993 ^{‡}	Dire Dawa	ATR 42-300	Unknown	None	2/34	The aircraft was hijacked by four people while en route a domestic scheduled Gambela Airport–Bole International Airport service, demanding to be flown to Djibouti. The plane landed at Dire Dawa for refueling. During a six-day-long period of negotiations, one hijacker attempted to escape and was shot wounded. A passenger resulted wounded and two other hijackers were killed amid a gunfire while the aircraft was stormed by security forces, and the remaining hijacker was arrested.	
22 October 1995 ^{‡}	Addis Ababa	Twin Otter 300	ET-AIO	W/O	0/20	Experienced a bird strike on approach to Bole International Airport, inbound from Dessie as Flight 173. The windshields resulted damaged. The pilots made a forced landing that ended up with the aircraft falling into a depression and ground looping.	
23 November 1996 ^{‡}	Moroni	Boeing 767-200ER	ET-AIZ	W/O	125/175	Flight 961 was hijacked by three hijackers while en route the second leg of a Bombay–Addis Ababa–Nairobi–Brazzaville–Lagos–Abidjan route. The hijackers instructed the pilot to fly to Australia. Instead, the pilots headed the aircraft southwards and flew it along the shore. Fuel eventually ran out and one of the engines stopped. A landing into shallow waters 500 yd (460 m) away from the shore, close to the Galawa Beach, near Moroni, was attempted. The water landing failed when the aircraft hit an unseen coral reef. Many passengers died because they inflated their life vests before leaving the flooded cabin. Among the dead was the Kenyan photojournalist Mohamed Amin, besides all of the hijackers. This crash is the carrier's second deadliest.	
9 June 2002 ^{‡}	Addis Ababa	Fokker 50	Unknown	Unknown	2/46	While attempting to hijack Flight 113, en route from Bahir Dar to Addis Ababa, two hijackers were shot dead by the security personnel on board, and a crew member was injured. The plane landed safely at the airport of destination.	
25 January 2010 ^{‡}	Off Beirut	Boeing 737-800	ET-ANB	W/O	90/90	Flight 409 was an international scheduled Beirut–Addis Ababa passenger service that plunged into the Mediterranean Sea 11 kilometres (6.8 mi) southwest of Rafic Hariri International Airport shortly after it took off from the airport in stormy weather. The aircraft was carrying 90 people on board —82 of them passengers—, most of them Ethiopian or Lebanese.	
17 February 2014 ^{‡}	Geneva	Boeing 767-300	ET-AMF	None	0/202	On 17 February 2014, Ethiopian Airlines Flight 702 flying from Addis Ababa to Rome and onwards to Milan was forced to land at Geneva airport after being hijacked by the co-pilot while flying north over Sudan. The aircraft circled Geneva airport several times while the co-pilot communicated with air traffic control to inquire about possibility of hijackers receiving asylum in Switzerland. Flight 702 landed with one engine and less than 10 minutes of fuel remaining. No passengers or crew were harmed and the hijacker was arrested.	
10 January 2015 ^{‡}	Accra	Boeing 737-400F	ET-AQV	W/O	0/3	On 10 January 2015, a Boeing 737-400 cargo plane operated by Ethiopian Airlines Flight KP4030, sustained substantial damage in a runway excursion on landing at Accra-Kotoka Airport (ACC), Ghana. The three crew members were taken to hospital.	
10 March 2019 ^{‡}	Addis Ababa	Boeing 737 MAX 8	ET-AVJ	W/O	157/157	Ethiopian Airlines Flight 302, a four-month-old Boeing 737 MAX 8, crashed near Bishoftu six minutes after takeoff from Bole International Airport, killing all 157 passengers and crew on board. The flight was scheduled as an international flight to Nairobi.	
22 July 2020 ^{‡}	Shanghai	Boeing 777F	ET-ARH	W/O	0	Destroyed by cargo fire on the ground at Shanghai Pudong International Airport.	
4 April 2021 ^{‡}	Ndola	Boeing 737-800	ET-AQP	None	0	Flight 841 landed at the under-construction and unopened Copperbelt International Airport instead of Simon Mwansa Kapwepwe International Airport.	
