= List of accidents and incidents involving the DC-3 (1975–1979) =

This is a list of accidents and incidents involving the Douglas DC-3^{A} aircraft, which have taken place from 1975 to 1979. It includes aircraft based on the DC-3 airframe such as the Douglas C-47 Skytrain and Lisunov Li-2. Military accidents are covered, as well as hijackings and incidents of terrorism. However, acts of war involving military aircraft are outside the scope of this list.

== 1975–1976 ==
Date	Type	Call sign	Fatalities	Info
January 1, 1975	Douglas C-47A	N9BC	None	Ditched off Fort Lauderdale, Florida. The aircraft was on a flight from Grand Bahama International Airport, Bahamas to Fort Lauderdale – Hollywood International Airport when the starboard propeller over-sped and had to be feathered. The port engine then overheated and lost power. All three people on board survived.
January 8, 1975	Douglas DC-3	FAC-688	30	Crashed shortly after take-off from Benito Salas Airport, Neiva on a flight to Gustavo Artunduaga Paredes Airport, Florencia. All 30 people on board were killed.
January 19, 1975	Douglas C-47B	XU-HAK	—N/a	Destroyed in a rocket attack at Pochentong International Airport, Phnom Penh.
January 19, 1975	Douglas DC-3	XU-KAL	—N/a	Destroyed in a rocket attack at Pochentong International Airport, Phnom Penh.
January 19, 1975	Douglas DC-3	N86AC	—N/a	Destroyed in a rocket attack at Pochentong International Airport, Phnom Penh.
January 30, 1975	Douglas DC-3	HI-222	1	Crashed on take-off from Las Américas International Airport, Santo Domingo killing one of the 30 people on board. The aircraft was on an international scheduled passenger flight to Mais Gate Airport, Port-au-Prince, Haiti.
February 1, 1975	Douglas DC-3	N15HC	5	Crashed on approach to Houston Intercontinental Airport, Texas when the port wing collided with an electricity pylon. The aircraft was on a domestic non-scheduled passenger flight from Lawton Municipal Airport, Oklahoma to Huntsville Regional Airport, Texas. Due to weather conditions, the flight was diverted to Houston. Of the 16 occupants, two crew and three passengers were killed.
February 1, 1975	Douglas C-47A	HC-AUR	—N/a	Crashed at Quito.
February 4, 1975	Douglas C-47	IJ818	—N/a	Damaged beyond economic repair in India.
February 17, 1975	Douglas C-47A	TG-AMA	—N/a	Destroyed by fire at El Petén Airport, Tikal. The registration TG-AMA was later used on another DC-3 owned by Aviateca.
February 22, 1975	Douglas C-47A	XU-GAJ	5	Damaged beyond economic repair in a rocket attack at Pochentong International Airport.
February 23, 1975	Douglas DC-3	—N/a	—N/a	Hijacked to Saudi Arabia. The aircraft was on a domestic passenger flight from Hodeidah International Airport, Yemen to Sanaa International Airport, Yemen.
February 25, 1975	Douglas DC-3	—N/a	None	Hijacked on a flight from Pagadian Airport, Pagadian City to Zamboanga International Airport, Zamboanga City. Both hijackers surrendered.
February 28, 1975	Douglas C-47B	N78705	—N/a	Written off at Madrid.
March 4, 1975	Douglas DC-3	FAB2047	1	Damaged beyond economic repair at Peixe, killing the pilot.
March 10, 1975	Douglas DC-3	—N/a	—N/a	Damaged beyond economic repair in a rocket attack at Pochentong International Airport, Phnom Penh.
March 11, 1975	Douglas DC-3	—N/a	—N/a	Damaged beyond economic repair in a rocket attack at Pochentong International Airport, Phnom Penh.
March 14, 1975	Douglas C-47	ET-ABR	1	Destroyed on the ground at Lalibela Airport during a clash with rebels.
March 24, 1975	Douglas C-47A	B-1553	—N/a	Crashed at Kompong Cham following a mid-air collision with a Cessna L-19 Bird Dog.
March 27, 1975	Douglas C-48A	N6	None	Crashed on take-off from DuBois-Jefferson County Airport, Pennsylvania. The aircraft was operating an executive flight to Harrisburg International Airport. All eleven people on board survived.
April 11, 1975	Douglas DC-3	—N/a	3	Hit by shrapnel shortly after take-off from Pochentong International Airport on a flight to Kampong Chhnang Airport. The aircraft was destroyed by fire and two of the three occupants were killed.
April 11, 1975	Douglas C-47B	XW-TFB	—N/a	Damaged beyond economic repair in a rocket attack on Pochentong International Airport.
April 19, 1975	Douglas C-47A	EL-AAB	None	Damaged beyond economic repair in a take-off accident at Roberts International Airport, Harbel. All 25 people on board survived.
April 29, 1975	Douglas VC-47A	084	—N/a	Crashed on landing at U-Tapao Royal Thai Navy Airfield, Sattahip. The aircraft was on a flight from Tan Son Nhat International Airport, Saigon.
May 3, 1975	Douglas DC-3	FAC-663	4	Crashed at Sardinata. The aircraft was on a domestic scheduled passenger flight from Aguas Claras Airport, Ocaña to Camilo Daza Airport, Cúcuta. Four of the seven occupants were killed.
May 17, 1975	Douglas C-47B	PP-CDD	—N/a	Damaged beyond economic repair at Jacarepaguá Airport, Rio de Janeiro.
May 19, 1975	Douglas C-47	BJ975	—N/a	Damaged beyond economic repair.
July 3, 1975	Douglas C-47A	FAC-970	10	Crashed at Colina killing all ten people on board.
July 21, 1975	Douglas C-47A	R3707	—N/a	Crashed.
July 25, 1975	Douglas R4D-1	C-GLUC	None	Ditched in shallow water on Lake Mistassini. The aircraft was on a domestic non-scheduled passenger flight from Matagami Airport to Quebec Airport, Quebec City. All 24 people on board survived.
July 26, 1975	Douglas C-47D	14+07	10	Damaged beyond economic repair in a take-off accident at Landsberg Air Base, Landsberg am Lech. Ten people were killed.
August 3, 1975	Douglas C-47	412	21	Ditched off Punta Amapala following fuel exhaustion. All 21 people on board were killed. The aircraft was on a flight to Ilopango International Airport, San Salvador when it was forced to divert due to weather conditions.
August 16, 1975	Douglas C-47A	6O-SAC	None	Crashed shortly after take-off from Bossaso Airport, Boosaaso following an engine malfunction believed to have been caused by contaminated fuel. All eleven people on board survived.
August 22, 1975	Douglas C-49J	HK-1517E	None	Damaged beyond economic repair at San Luis Airport, Ipiales.
August 27, 1975	Douglas C-47B	5Y-AAF	None	Damaged beyond economic repair in a landing accident at Mtwara Airport. The aircraft was on a scheduled passenger flight. All 19 people on board survived.
September 11, 1975	Douglas C-47A	N144A	2	Crashed at Wakeman, Ohio killing both crew. The aircraft was on a ferry flight from Wakeman Airport to Miami, Florida.
September 11, 1975	Douglas C-47	ET-ABX	1	Crashed into Choke Mountain near Mota killing one of the nine people on board. The aircraft was on a domestic scheduled passenger flight from Bahir Dar Airport to Debre Marqos Airport.
September 13, 1975	Douglas EC-47A	FAB2065	None	Ditched off Itaparica, both crew members survived.
September 17, 1975	Douglas EC-47A	125	9	Crashed at Ritoque killing nine people.
September 17, 1975	Douglas DC-3	7O-ABP	—N/a	Damaged beyond economic repair in a landing accident at Beihan Airport. The aircraft had departed from Aden International Airport.
September 25, 1975	Douglas C-47A	C-FECY	—N/a	Damaged beyond economic repair at Lac Guyere, Quebec.
September 25, 1975	Douglas C-47A	CF-AII	3	Crashed short of the runway at Fort Severn Airport killing all three people on board. The aircraft was operating a non-scheduled passenger flight.
November 3, 1975	Douglas C-47A	C-FOOY	None	Written off in a wheels-up landing 43 nautical miles (80 km) north of Frobisher Bay, Northwest Territories. The aircraft was unable to land at its destination due to weather conditions and eventually ran out of fuel. All 26 people on board survived.
November 5, 1975	Douglas C-47B	T.3-30	—N/a	Damaged beyond economic repair.
November 5, 1975	Douglas C-47B	T.3-35	—N/a	Damaged beyond economic repair.
November 5, 1975	Douglas C-47A	T.3-31	—N/a	Damaged beyond economic repair.
November 15, 1975	Douglas C-47	C-FCSC	—N/a	Damaged beyond economic repair by a fire at La Grande Rivière Airport, Radisson, Quebec.
November 18, 1975	Douglas C-47	TG-AGA	15	Crashed within Petén Department whilst on a passenger flight from Uaxactun Airport to Flores International Airport, Santa Elena. Of the 22 occupants, only 7 crew members survived.
November 29, 1975	Douglas C-47A	C-FOOX	—N/a	Damaged beyond economic repair at Igloolik Airport, Northwest Territories.
January 18, 1976	Douglas C-47	CP-573	7	Crashed near Capitán Germán Quiroga Guardia Airport, San Borja following a failure of the starboard engine. The aircraft was on a domestic non-scheduled passenger flight. Seven of the ten people on board were killed.
January 29, 1976	Douglas C-47D	T.3-32	—N/a	Involved in an accident and subsequently withdrawn from use.
February 16, 1976	Douglas C-47A	TT-LAG	—N/a	Damaged beyond economic repair in an accident at Faya-Largeau Airport.
March 24, 1976	Douglas C-47A	XW-TAF	—N/a	Damaged beyond economic repair in a storm at Wattay International Airport, Vientiane.
March 24, 1976	Douglas C-47B	XW-TDF	—N/a	Damaged beyond economic repair in a storm at Wattay International Airport, Vientiane.
March 24, 1976	Douglas C-47B	XW-TDR	—N/a	Damaged beyond economic repair in a storm at Wattay International Airport, Vientiane.
April 2, 1976	Douglas DC-3	FAC-676	5	Crashed on approach to Gustavo Artunduaga Paredes Airport, Florencia. The aircraft was on a flight from Tres de Mayo Airport, Puerto Asís. Five of the 16 people on board were killed.
April 23, 1976	Douglas C-47A	ET-AAS	—N/a	Damaged beyond economic repair at Massawa Airport.
May 20, 1976	Douglas C-47	CF-FKZ	—N/a	Damaged beyond economic repair in an accident at Asbestos Hill Airport, Quebec.
May 31, 1976	Douglas C-47B	ET-ADC	—N/a	Destroyed by fire after an explosion whilst taxiing at Massawa Airport.
June 6, 1976	Lisunov Li-2	CCCP-13345	4	Crashed into the Kama River following an engine failure. The aircraft hit telephone lines and then crashed. It was on a flight from Moscow to Tyumen.
June 11, 1976	Douglas C-47A	PP-AJC	3	Written off at Rio Manana. Three people were killed.
July 5, 1976	Douglas C-47	—N/a	17	Crashed near Daiku. All 17 people on board were killed.
July 14, 1976	Lisunov Li-2	CCCP-13369	—N/a	Crashed after takeoff from an unidentified Soviet airfield. The wrong type of fuel had been tanked and the aircraft was also overloaded.
September 7, 1976	Douglas C-47	C-GKFC	None	Destroyed by fire after an emergency landing near Brockett, Alberta. All 26 people on board escaped. The aircraft was on a domestic non-scheduled passenger flight from Vernon Airport, British Columbia to Lethbridge Airport, Alberta.
September 23, 1976	Douglas C-47A	L2-40/15	—N/a	Damaged beyond economic repair in a take-off accident at Sakon Nakhon Airport.
October 25, 1976	Douglas C-47	HK-149	36	Crashed on approach to El Alcaraván Airport, Yopal. The aircraft was on a domestic scheduled passenger flight. Shortly after take-off, the port engine failed and the decision was made to return to El Alcaraván. All 36 people on board were killed.
November 5, 1976	Douglas DC-3	HP-671	2	Disappeared on a flight from Hato International Airport, Willemstad to Mais Gate Airport, Port-au-Prince. Both crew members were declared dead in absentia.
November 12, 1976	Douglas C-47	BJ922	—N/a	Damaged beyond economic repair.
November 25, 1976	Douglas C-47	CP-755	None	Damaged beyond economic repair in a landing accident at El Alto International Airport, La Paz. The aircraft was on a cargo flight, all four people on board survived.
November 30, 1976	Douglas C-117B	N2010	—N/a	Crashed into a mountain near Victoria whilst on a flight dispersing sterile screw-worms.
December 10, 1976	Douglas C-47A	C-FIAX	None	Crashed on take-off from Chisabisi Airport. All eight people on board survived.
December 14, 1976	Douglas C-47B	ET-AEJ	None	Damaged beyond economic repair when the undercarriage collapsed on landing at Oborso Airport. The aircraft was on a scheduled passenger flight. All eight people on board survived.

== 1977–1978 ==
Date	Type	Call sign	Fatalities	Info
January 6, 1977	Douglas C-47A	CP-728	None	Damaged beyond economic repair in a belly landing at La Senda. The aircraft was on a domestic cargo flight from Viru Viru International Airport, Santa Cruz de la Sierra to Teniente Jorge Henrich Arauz Airport, Trinidad when the pilot decided to return to Viru Viru following a problem with the port engine. The starboard engine also malfunctioned and it was then impossible to maintain height despite cargo being jettisoned. All four people on board survived.
January 6, 1977	Douglas C-47B	R7034	3	On 6 January, Douglas C-47B R7034 of No. 3 Squadron, Royal Rhodesian Air Force collided with electricity poles shortly after take-off from Buffalo Range Airport and crashed, killing all three crew.
January 15, 1977	Douglas DC-3	N73KW	None	Crashed shortly after take-off from Miami International Airport, Florida on a domestic scheduled passenger flight to Key West International Airport, Florida. All 33 people on board survived.
February 7, 1977	Douglas C-47A	PK-NDH	—N/a	Damaged beyond economic repair in a landing accident at Tanjung Santan Airport.
February 14, 1977	Douglas C-47A	PK-WWK	—N/a	Damaged beyond economic repair. As of 2000, the aircraft was reported to still be in existence.
February 17, 1977	Douglas C-47B	FAC-1125	None	Damaged beyond economic repair in a take-off accident at Fabio Alberto León Bentley Airport, Mitú. All 28 people on board survived.
February 28, 1977	Douglas C-47A	C-FNAR	4	Crashed near Salluit, Quebec in white-out conditions. Four of the ten people on board were killed.
February 28, 1977	Douglas C-47A	C-FIQR	—N/a	Crashed near Saglone, Quebec.
March 1, 1977	Douglas C-47A	7O-ABF	19	Crashed into the Red Sea shortly after take-off from Aden International Airport. The aircraft was on a scheduled passenger flight. All 19 people on board were killed.
March 25, 1977	Douglas C-53	N692A	—N/a	Damaged beyond economic repair in a heavy landing at Cyril E. King Airport, Charlotte Amalie.
March 28, 1977	Douglas C-47A	N57131	None	Destroyed by fire following a taxiing accident at O'Hare International Airport, Chicago, Illinois. The aircraft was due to operate a cargo flight.
March 31, 1977	Douglas DC-3	RP-C368	8	The pilot of a Swiftair flight shot and killed eight passengers whilst the aircraft was in flight. The Douglas DC-3 suffered minor damage. It was repaired and returned to service.
April 5, 1977	Douglas C-47A	VT-EEL	6	Crashed into a hill in the Velikonda Range at Edavlli, killing all ten people on board. The aircraft was on a survey flight.
April 10, 1977	Douglas DC-3	HK-556	35	Crashed into Rio Guape at an altitude of 7,200 feet (2,200 m). The aircraft was on a domestic non-scheduled passenger flight from La Vanguardia Airport, Villavicencio to El Dorado International Airport, Bogotá. The wreckage was not discovered for 35 days. All 35 people on board were killed.
April 11, 1977	Douglas C-47B	C-FXXT	None	Damaged beyond economic repair in an aborted take-off at Wunnummin Lake Airport.
April 16, 1977	Douglas C-47A	B-247	—N/a	Damaged beyond economic repair in a landing accident at Tainan Airport.
April 25, 1977	Douglas DC-3	Unknown	3	Hijacked on a flight from Alula Aba Airport, Mek'ele to Gondar Airport. Three people were killed, and the hijackers were overpowered.
May 12, 1977	Douglas R4D-1	C-FBKV	1	Written off in an accident at Pickle Lake Airport, Ontario. One person was killed.
May 25, 1977	Douglas C-47	IJ297	—N/a	Written off in an accident.
May 30, 1977	Douglas C-47A	R3702	1	Hit by a RPG-7 fired by ZANLA guerillas during take-off from Mapai. One person was killed.
June 10, 1977	Douglas C-47	5U-AAJ	None	Written off in a forced landing at Founkoueye following an engine failure. The aircraft was on a scheduled passenger flight which had departed from Tahoua Airport. All 21 people on board survived.
June 12, 1977	Douglas DC-3A	N33649	—N/a	Written off in a forced landing at Vero Beach, Florida whilst being used to smuggle drugs.
June 12, 1977	Douglas C-47A	ET-AAP	—N/a	Damaged beyond economic repair in a landing accident at Kabri Dar Airport, Kebri Dahar when the port undercarriage collapsed.
June 17, 1977	Douglas C-47	HK-1511	—N/a	Damaged beyond economic repair in an accident at Condonto Airport.
June 21, 1977	Douglas C-47	Unknown	5	Crashed on take-off from Don Muang AFB, Bangkok. Five of the twelve people on board were killed when the aircraft collided with a Fairchild C-123 Provider.
June 27, 1977	Douglas C-47D	L2-11/96/45941	None	Crashed in the Lamlukka District when on a flight from Udorn AFB to Don Muang AFB.
July 18, 1977	Douglas DC-3A	N459	2	Crashed at Sheridan, Wyoming whilst engaged in spraying. Both crew were killed and the aircraft was destroyed by fire.
July 19, 1977	Douglas C-47A	HK-166	None	Crashed on approach to Fabio Alberto Leon Bentley Airport, Mitú. All ten people on board survived.
July 20, 1977	Douglas R4D-1	ET-ABF	5	Crashed into a mountain near Tubo Milkie whilst on a domestic cargo flight from Tippi Airport to Jimma Airport. All five people on board were killed.
July 25, 1977	Douglas C-47	FAH-301	25	Crashed shortly after take-off from Yoro Airport due to the failure of the port engine. The aircraft was on a military flight to Toncontín International Airport, Tegucigalpa. Twenty-five of the 40 people on board were killed.
August 12, 1977	Douglas C-53D	ET-AGR	—N/a	Destroyed in an air raid at Jijiga Airport.
August 14, 1977	Douglas C-47A	ET-AAP	—N/a	Shot down at Massawa.
September 21, 1977	Douglas C-47	N723A	—N/a	Crashed at Narsarsuaq Airport.
September 30, 1977	Douglas C-47A	TG-AKA	1	Damaged beyond economic repair in a landing accident at Flores International Airport, Santa Elena. One of the three crew members was killed.
October 2, 1977	Douglas C-47A	N65121	None	Shot down by the Fuerza Aérea Colombiana near Villavicencio whilst being used on a drug‑smuggling flight. Both crew were captured.
October 23, 1977	Douglas C-47	C-FSAW	3	An dc-3 Crashed into a mountain near Manidar whilst on a survey flight. All three crew were killed.
October 28, 1977	Douglas DC-3	Vietnam Civil Aviation Flight 509	3	Hijacked to U-Tapao International Airport where the four hijackers surrendered. Two people on board the aircraft were killed in the hijacking. The aircraft was on a domestic flight from Tan Son Nhat International Airport, Ho Chi Minh City to Phu Quoc Airport, Duong Dong.
November 20, 1977	Douglas C-47B	FAC-1127	—N/a	Crashed in Colombia.
November 20, 1977	Douglas C-47A	FAC-1120	—N/a	Crashed at Llanos del Yori, Colombia.
December 13, 1977	Douglas DC-3	N51071	29	Crashed on take-off from Evansville Regional Airport, Indiana whilst on a domestic non-scheduled passenger flight to Nashville Metropolitan Airport, Tennessee. All 29 people on board were killed. The cause of the accident was that the gust locks had not been removed and the aircraft was improperly loaded, resulting in an aft centre of gravity.
January 2, 1978	Douglas DC-3	N15598	None	Ditched in the sea 1,000 feet (300 m) off San Juan, Puerto Rico. The aircraft was on an international scheduled passenger flight from Saint Thomas Airport, United States Virgin Islands to San Juan. All five people on board survived. The cause of the accident was that the pilot mismanaged the fuel system, running the starboard tanks dry when there was fuel available in the port tanks.
January 27, 1978	Douglas DC-3D	HK-1351	12	Crashed into a mountain at Cerro Granada, Caquetá, killing all twelve people on board. The altitude of the crash site is 6,800 feet (2,100 m), and the mountain was obscured by clouds at the time. The aircraft was on a scheduled passenger flight.
January 28, 1978	Douglas C-47	TT-EAB	—N/a	In Chad, Douglas C-47 TT-EAB of Air Tchad was reportedly shot down by rebels near Tibesti. The damaged aircraft apparently landed at N'Djamena International Airport where it was to be seen in 1980, but has since been scrapped.
February 8, 1978	Douglas C-49J	N189UM	None	Damaged beyond repair in a landing accident at Tamanrasset Airport in Algeria.
February 10, 1978	Douglas C-47A	CX-BJH	44	Crashed shortly after take-off from Artigas Airport on a domestic scheduled passenger flight to Carrasco International Airport, Montevideo. All 44 people on board were killed, making this the second-worst involving a DC-3 and the worst aviation accident in Uruguay at the time.
February 21, 1978	Douglas DC-3	FAC-668	5	Crashed at an unknown location in Colombia.
March 15, 1978	Douglas C-47	L2/48/18/100937	—N/a	Damaged beyond repair in an accident at Don Nok Royal Thai Air Force Base. The port engine failed shortly after take-off and an emergency landing was being attempted.
March 23, 1978	Douglas C-47A	N1546A	1	Ditched off Grand Turk Island in the Turks and Caicos Islands following an onboard fire. One of the three crew was killed.
May 19, 1978	Douglas C-47A	VT-DEU	8	Crashed at Badkhalsa in India following a failure of the port engine. All eight people on board were killed.
May 30, 1978	Douglas C-47B	TG-LAM	—N/a	Crashed near Volcán Santo Tomás in Guatemala.
July 9, 1978	Douglas C-47A	N45873	None	Damaged beyond repair in a take-off accident at Richmond Municipal Airport in the American state of Indiana. All 42 people on board survived. The aircraft was on a local flight dropping parachutists. The cause of the accident was a jam in the elevator control system.
July 20, 1978	Douglas C-47A	TG-PAW	—N/a	Damaged beyond repair in an accident at Guatemala's Lake Peten Itza whilst on a flight from Dos Lagunas Airport to Flores International Airport.
July 26, 1978	Douglas DC-3	TG-AFA	—N/a	Overran the runway at Flores International Airport in Guatemala following a birdstrike on take-off and was reported to have been damaged beyond economic repair. The aircraft was later repaired and returned to service.
July 28, 1978	Douglas C-47B	F-BIEE	—N/a	Crashed into the Mediterranean Sea off Italy whilst on an illegal flight from France to an unknown African destination.
August 17, 1978	Douglas C-47B	G-AMSM	None	Damaged beyond economic repair in a take-off accident at Lydd (Ferryfield) Airport. The nose section of this aircraft is preserved at Brenzett Aeronautical Museum, Kent.
September 18, 1978	Douglas C-47A	C-FCRW	None	Damaged beyond economic repair in a landing accident at Komakuk Airport, Northwest Territories.
September 21, 1978	Douglas DC-3	N407D	4	Crashed into the Caribbean Sea off the coast of the United States whilst on a ferry flight from Florida's Fort Lauderdale International Airport to José Martí International Airport in Havana, Cuba. All four people on board were killed. The aircraft disappeared off radar screens at 12:43 local time (17:43 UTC). A search was initiated, which USCGC Steadfast coordinated, but was called off on 24 September without any trace of N407D being found.
September 24, 1978	Douglas C-47B	G-BFPU	None	Damaged beyond repair in following a forced landing 6.9 nautical miles (12.8 km) north east of Karima, Sudan following problems with both engines. Following a successful belly landing, the aircraft was destroyed by the subsequent fire.
October 1, 1978	Douglas R4D-6	N47Z	1	Ditched off Fort Walton Beach, Florida following a failure of the electrical system whilst on a flight from Miami International Airport to an unnamed airport in San Juan, Puerto Rico. One of the four people on board was killed.
October 3, 1978	Douglas C-47A	DO-10	15	Crashed into Finland's Lake Juurusvesi when attempting to return to Kuopio Airport. All 15 on board were killed. The aircraft was on a military flight to Helsinki Airport when an engine failed shortly after take-off and the decision was made to return to Kuopio.
October 5, 1978	Douglas C-47A	PK-NDI	—N/a	Caught fire whilst parked at Ngurah Rai International Airport on the Indonesian island of Bali and was destroyed.
October 7, 1978	Douglas C-47A	PT-KVU	None	Damaged beyond economic repair when it overran the runway on landing at Carlos Prates Airport, Belo Horizonte. All 19 people on board survived.
October 15, 1978	Douglas C-47A	ET-AGK	None	Damaged beyond economic repair in a landing accident at Soddu Airport in Ethiopia following a hydraulic system failure. The aircraft was on a domestic scheduled passenger flight. All 32 people on board survived. The aircraft was later used as an instructional airframe. As of July 2010, the aircraft is reported to be stored at Addis Ababa.
October 25, 1978	Douglas C-47A	ET-AGQ	None	Damaged beyond economic repair in a landing accident at Degahbur Airport. Although the aircraft was on a cargo flight, it was carrying nine passengers and four crew, all of whom survived.
November 14, 1978	Douglas C-47A	4W-ABY	—N/a	Damaged beyond economic repair in a landing accident at Mareb Airport in Egypt.
November 21, 1978	Douglas C-47A	HK-1393	28	Crashed into Colombia's Mount Judio at an altitude of 11,200 feet (3,400 m) whilst on a domestic scheduled passenger flight from Camilo Daza International Airport to Santiago Pérez Quiroz Airport. All 28 people on board were killed.
December 2, 1978	Douglas C-47A	N41447	None	Crashed short of the runway at Des Moines International Airport, Idaho whilst on a cargo flight from Chicago. Airframe icing was a factor in the accident.
December 5, 1978	Douglas C-53	N25656	3	Crashed shortly after take-off from Sebring Airport, Florida and was destroyed by fire. The gust locks had not been removed before flight and the aircraft was overloaded. All three people on board were killed.
December 11, 1978	Douglas C-49J	N133AC	2	Crashed near Port Mayaca, Florida due to fuel exhaustion. The aircraft was being used to smuggle marijuana at the time and both crew were killed.
December 14, 1978	Douglas C-47A	N4996E	—N/a	Written off in a crash landing in a sugar cane field at Battle Creek, Florida whilst being used to smuggle marijuana. The pilot was not qualified to fly the aircraft and mismanaged the fuel system. both crew were killed.

== 1979 ==
Date	Type	Call sign	Fatalities	Info
January 10, 1979	Douglas DC-3A	N9025R	None	Damaged beyond economic repair in a landing accident at Southbay Airport, Florida. The aircraft nosed over when it landed on soft ground.
January 28, 1979	Douglas C-47	ET-AGP	—N/a	Damaged beyond economic repair in an accident at Heycota in Eritrea. Three people were killed.
February 19, 1979	Douglas C-47	ET-AFW	5	Crashed at Barentu Airport in Eritrea after a bomb exploded on board. All five people on board the aircraft were killed.
April 5, 1979	Douglas C-47A	L2-26/02	—N/a	Hit by a car on the ground at an airfield in Thailand. The aircraft was subsequently written off.
April 8, 1979	Douglas C-47	Unknown	—N/a	Damaged beyond economic repair at Condega.
April 20, 1979	Douglas C-47A	ET-AGU	None	Damaged in a landing accident at Oborso Airport. The aircraft was repaired and returned to service.
May 7, 1979	Douglas DC-3	TG-SAB	—N/a	Damaged in a landing accident at Flores International Airport, Flores-Santa Elena when it departed the runway and collided with a car. The aircraft was subsequently repaired and returned to service.
June 11, 1979	Douglas C-47A	N148Z	10	Damaged beyond repair when an engine caught fire in flight and then fell off. The aircraft was on a domestic non-scheduled passenger flight that had departed from Grangeville County Airport. Although a forced landing was made in the Selway River some 48 nautical miles (89 km) north east of Elk City, Idaho, ten of the twelve people on board were killed.
June 12, 1979	Douglas DC-3D	N427W	2	Crashed shortly after take-off from Fort Lauderdale Executive Airport after take-off was attempted at too low an airspeed. Both crew were killed. The pilot did not have a rating to fly the DC-3 and the aircraft did not have a certificate of airworthiness.
August 31, 1979	Douglas DC-3	HI-237	—N/a	Damaged beyond repair by Hurricane David at an airport in Santo Domingo in the Dominican Republic.
September 21, 1979	Douglas C-47A	ET-AGU	—N/a	Damaged beyond economic repair in a take-off accident at Barentu Airport.
October 30, 1979	Douglas C-47B	N99663	2	Written off in a landing accident at Bettles Airport in the American state of Alaska. The aircraft struck three parked aircraft. It was on a cargo flight from Fairbanks International Airport, Alaska, to Ambler Airport, Alaska via Bettles. All four aircraft were substantially damaged.
November 10, 1979	Douglas C-47B	ST-AHH	—N/a	Crashed at Kadugli Airport in Sudan and was destroyed by the subsequent fire.
November 13, 1979	Douglas C-47A	PT-KVT	—N/a	Crashed 5 nautical miles (9.3 km) north of Cascavel.
December 27, 1979	Douglas C-47	313	2	Crashed at Puerto Lempira in Honduras whilst on a military flight. Both crew were killed and some of the passengers were injured.

== Notes ==
^Note A Military versions of the DC-3 were known as C-47 Skytrain, C-48, C-49, C-50, C-51, C-52, C-53 Skytrooper, C-68, C-84, C-117 Super Dakota and YC-129 by the United States Army Air Forces and as the R4D by the United States Navy. In Royal Air Force (and other British Commonwealth air forces') service, these aircraft were known as Dakotas.
