= Hawassa Airport =

Airport in Hawassa, Southern Nations, Nationalities, and Peoples' Region, Ethiopia

Hawassa Airport ሀዋሳ አውሮፕላን ወደብ
- IATA: AWA; ICAO: HALA

Summary
- Airport type: Public
- Serves: Hawassa
- Elevation AMSL: 5,604 ft / 1,708 m
- Coordinates: 7°05′42″N 38°23′54″E

Map
- Location of the airport in Ethiopia

Runways
Direction	Length		Surface
Direction	m	ft	Surface
Old 17/35	1,290	4,232	Dirt
New 01/19	3,130	10,269	Asphalt
- Source: Google Maps GCM

Hawassa Airport (Amharic: ሀዋሳ አውሮፕላን መንገድ; Aw'asa) (IATA: AWA, ICAO: HALA) is Sub Ethiopian Airlines which serves in Hawassa, Sidama Region, Ethiopia. The construction of the airport (Coordinates: 7°05′42″N 38°23′54″E) started at the beginning of 2015. The old dirt runway is within the city, at 7°04′00″N 38°29′25″E.

== Airlines and destinations ==
Airlines	Destinations
Ethiopian Airlines	Addis Ababa

== See also ==
- List of airports in Ethiopia
- Transport in Ethiopia
