= Neghelle Airport =

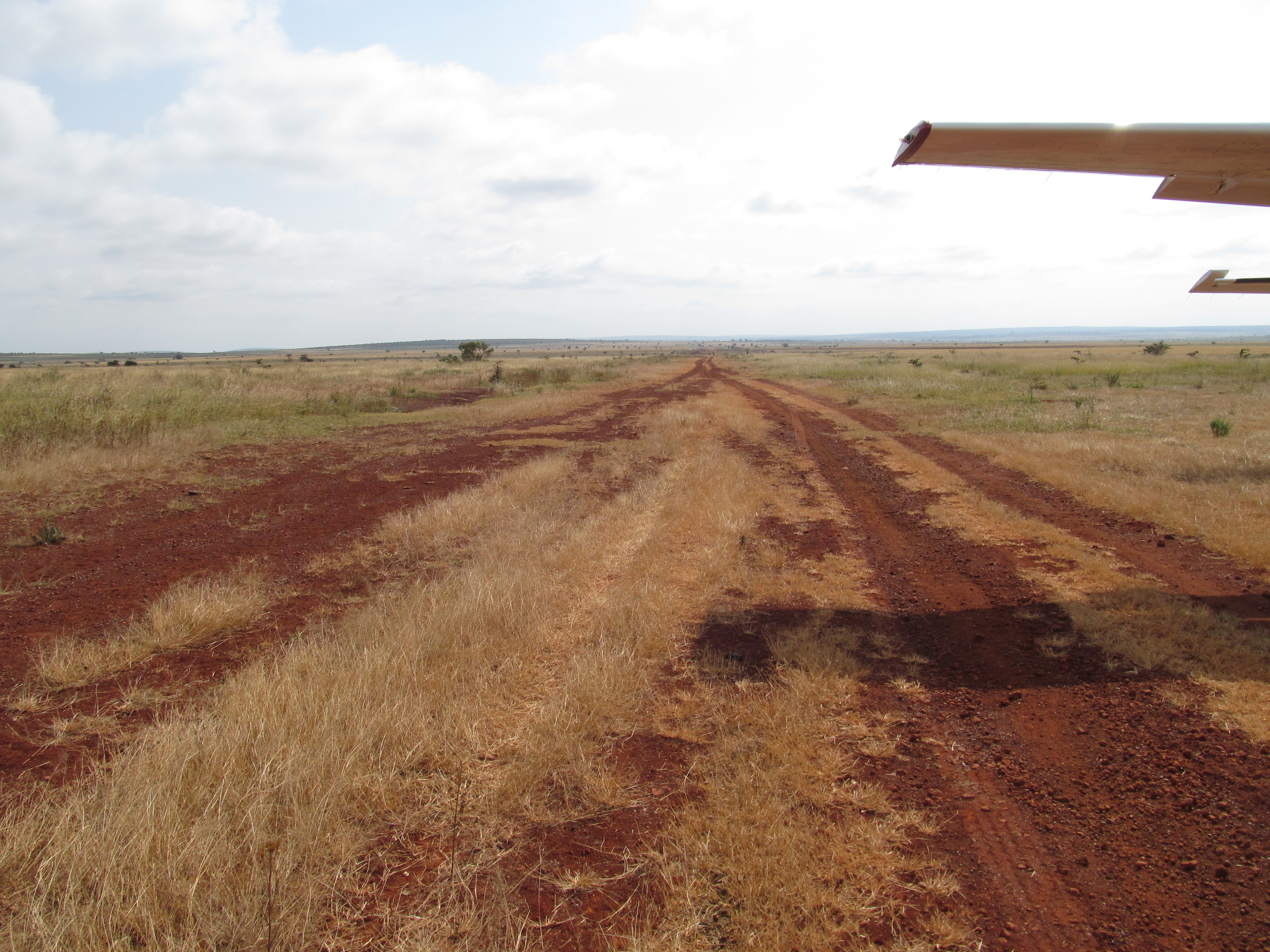
- IATA: EGL; ICAO: HANG

Summary
- Serves: Negele Boran
- Location: Ethiopia
- Coordinates: 5°17′N 39°45′E

Map
- Location of the airport in Ethiopia
- Sources: Great Circle Mapper, ICAO

Neghelle Airport (IATA: EGL, ICAO: HANG) is a military airport located in Negele Boran, Ethiopia.

== See also ==
- List of airports in Ethiopia
