= Asosa Airport =

Airport in Benishangul-Gumuz Region, Ethiopia

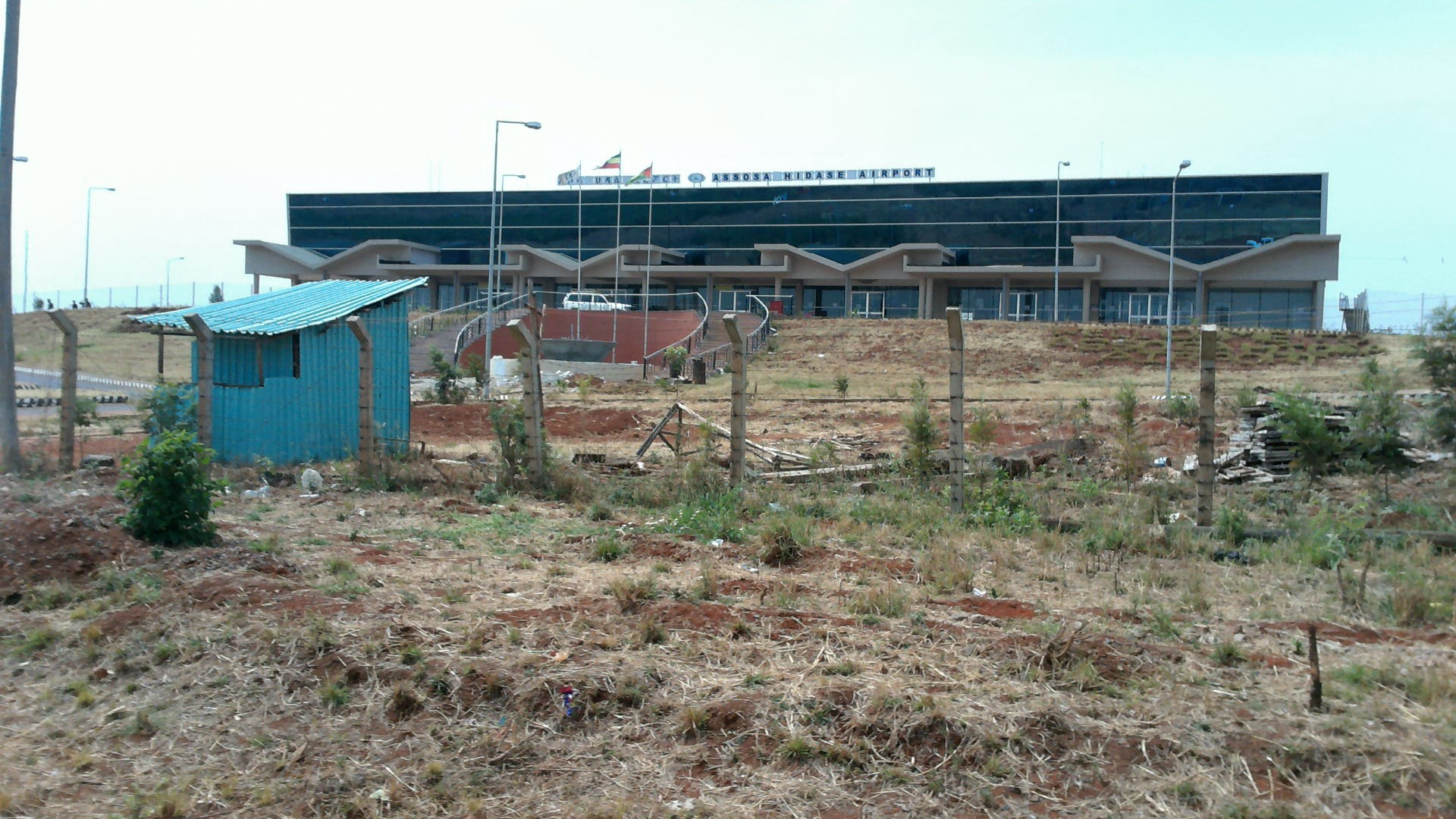
- IATA: ASO; ICAO: HASO

Summary
- Airport type: Public
- Operator: Ethiopian Airports Enterprise
- Serves: Asosa, Ethiopia
- Elevation AMSL: 1,561 m (5,121 ft)
- Coordinates: 10°01′06″N 034°35′10″E

Map
- Location within Ethiopia

Runways
Direction	Length		Surface
Direction	m	ft	Surface
11/29	1,950	6,398	Asphalt

Asosa Airport (IATA: ASO, ICAO: HASO) is a public airport serving Asosa, the capital of the western Benishangul-Gumuz Region in Ethiopia. The name of the city and airport may also be transliterated as Assosa. The airport is located 5.5 km (3.4 miles) southeast of the city.

== Facilities ==
The airport sits at an elevation of 1,561 metres (5,121 ft) above mean sea level. It has one runway designated 11/29, with an asphalt surface measuring 1,950 by 46 metres (6,398 ft × 151 ft).

== Airlines and destinations ==
Airlines	Destinations
Ethiopian Airlines	Addis Ababa
