= Dodola Airport =

Airport in Dodola, Ethiopia

- IATA: none; ICAO: HADO

Summary
- Airport type: Public
- Serves: Dodola
- Elevation AMSL: 8,234 ft / 2,510 m
- Coordinates: 7°01′15″N 39°03′00″E

Map
- Location of the airport in Ethiopia

Runways
| Direction | Length | | Surface |
| Direction | m | ft | Surface |
|---|---|---|---|
| 07/25 | 1,850 | 6,070 | Grass |
- Source: Google Maps GCM

Dodola Airport (ICAO: HADO) is an airstrip serving the city of Dodola in the Oromia Region of Ethiopia. The runway is 15 kilometres (9.3 mi) west of the city.

The airstrip lies 8,234 feet (2,510 m) above mean sea level.

== See also ==
- Transport in Ethiopia
- List of airports in Ethiopia
