= Semera Airport =

Airport in Semera, Afar Region, Ethiopia

- IATA: SZE; ICAO: HASM

Summary
- Airport type: Public
- Owner: Ethiopian Civil Aviation Authority
- Operator: Ethiopian Airports Enterprise
- Serves: Semera
- Location: Afar Region
- Hub for: hub regional
- Elevation AMSL: 1,390 ft / 424 m
- Coordinates: 11°47′15″N 40°59′30″E

Map
- Location of the airport in Ethiopia

Runways
Direction	Length		Surface
Direction	m	ft	Surface
13/31	2,500	8,202	Concrete
- Source: GCM Google Maps SkyVector

Semera Airport (IATA: SZE, ICAO: HASM) is an airport serving Semera, a city in the Afar Region in northeastern Ethiopia.

The airport is on the west side of the village. The former gravel runway was paved and a terminal complex added after 2016.

== Airlines and destinations ==
Airlines	Destinations
Ethiopian Airlines	Addis Ababa, Bahir Dar, Gondar, Mekele, Shire

== See also ==
- Transport in Ethiopia
- List of airports in Ethiopia
