= Ginir =

Ginir ጊኒር
- Location within Ethiopia
- Coordinates: 7°8′N 40°42′E
- Country: Ethiopia
- Region: Oromia
- Zone: Bale Zone
- Elevation: 1,986 m (6,516 ft)

Population (2005)
  - Total: 21,585
- Time zone: UTC+3 (EAT)

Ginir (also transliterated Ginnir, Ghinnir) is a town in southeastern Ethiopia. Located in the East Bale Zone of the Oromia Region, this town has a latitude and longitude of 7°08′N 40°42′E and an elevation between 1750 and 1986 meters above sea level.

Ginir is the administrative center of Ginir district and Bale Zone. It is served by an airport.

== History ==
In the 19th century, Ginir was the major commercial center southwest of the Awash River. Not only was it where salt was sold to traders who then supplied the districts south of Shewa, but it was the beginning of a trade route that reached south to Luuq (in modern-day Somalia) and beyond to Bardera. When the American Arthur Donaldson Smith was exploring the upper reaches of the Shebelle River in October 1894, he found that the local Ethiopian governor, Ras Wolde Guebre, had made Ginir his headquarters and had installed a garrison of about 200 men. A post route by mule from Addis Ababa to Ginir existed in 1904, one of the few places in southern Ethiopia with that kind of service at that time. A post office was opened within the period 1923-1932; a postal cancellation is known from 1928.

Despite this early economic activity, when C.W. Gwynn visited Ginir in 1908 it had declined since Donaldson Smith's time: "It should be a considerable market for salt, obtained in the district between the Wabi and Web, and also for ivory; but it had been used of recent years as a jumping-off place for raids against the Ogaden, and traders were afraid to venture there. The main traffic is the lucrative, though illicit, trade in arms." During the previous year, governor Dejazmach Lul Seged had clashed with the Italian garrison at Luuq and two Italian officers were killed; at the Italian government's insistence the Dejazmach had been removed from his post, but his retinue "looted the neighbourhood, and the garrison established by the new governor extorted what little was left for their immediate wants."

== Demographics ==
Based on figures from the Central Statistical Agency in 2005, this town has an estimated total population of 21,585, of whom 10,849 are men and 10,736 are women. The 1994 national census reported this town had a total population of 12,068 of whom 5,884 were men and 6,184 were women.
