= Jinka Airport =

Airport in Jinka, Ethiopia

Jinka Airport ጂንካ አየር ማረፊያ
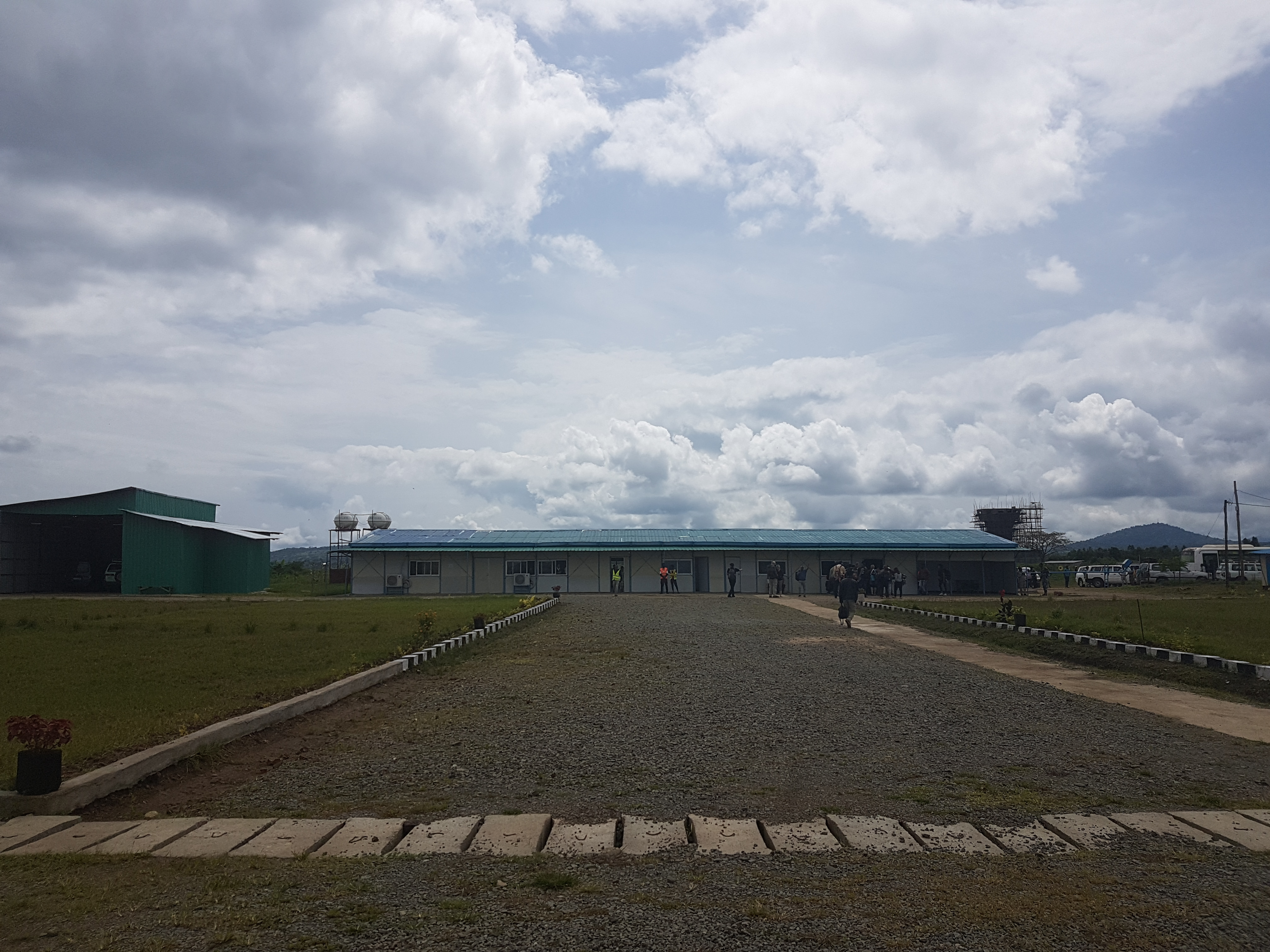
- Jinka Airport in 2018 before the opening of the new terminal.
- IATA: BCO; ICAO: HABC

Summary
- Airport type: Public
- Owner: Federal Government of Ethiopia
- Operator: Ethiopian Airlines Group
- Serves: Jinka
- Location: Jinka, Ethiopia
- Elevation AMSL: 4,580 ft / 1,396 m
- Coordinates: 5°45′00″N 36°33′45″E

Map
- Location of the airport in Ethiopia

Runways
Direction	Length		Surface
Direction	m	ft	Surface
12/30	2,500	8,202	Asphalt
- Source: Google Maps GCM

Jinka Airport (IATA: BCO, ICAO: HABC), sometimes known as Baco Airport, is a public airport serving the town of Jinka in southern Ethiopia. The airport is located approximately 4 kilometres (2.5 mi) south of Jinka town centre. The airport serves as a gateway to the Omo River Valley region.

== Facilities ==
The previous gravel runway was paved and extended to a 2,500 by 45 metre asphalt runway in August 2017.

On April 13, 2024, a new terminal was inaugurated by Ethiopian Airlines after two years of construction. The new terminal measures about 3,500 square metres with an investment exceeding €8 million. It features modern passenger service areas and dedicated VIP lounges.

== Airlines and destinations ==
Airlines	Destinations
Ethiopian Airlines	Addis Ababa

== See also ==
- Transport in Ethiopia
- List of airports in Ethiopia
