= Nekemte Airport =

Airport in Nekemte, Oromia Region, Ethiopia

- IATA: NEK; ICAO: HANK

Summary
- Serves: Nekemte, Ethiopia
- Elevation AMSL: 6,500 ft / 1,981 m
- Coordinates: 9°3′N 36°36′E

Map
- Location of the airport in Ethiopia

Runways
Direction	Length		Surface
Direction	ft	m	Surface
	4,101	1,250
- Great Circle Mapper

Nekemte Airport (IATA: NEK, ICAO: HANK) is an airport serving the town of Nekemte, in Oromia Region, Ethiopia.

== Airlines and destinations ==
Airlines	Destinations
Ethiopian Airlines	Addis Ababa

== See also ==
- List of airports in Ethiopia
