= Mendi, Oromia =

Town in Oromia Region, Ethiopia

Mendi መንዲ
- Town
- Location within Oromia
- Coordinates: 9°36′N 35°36′E
- Country: Ethiopia
- Region: Oromia
- Zone: West Welega
- Elevation: 1,821 m (5,974 ft)

Population (2005)
  - Total: 18,020
- Time zone: UTC+3 (EAT)

Mendi (Amharic:መንዲ; also transliterated Mandi) is a town in western Ethiopia. Located in the West Welega Zone of the Oromia Region, this town has a latitude and longitude of 9°36′N 35°36′E with an elevation of 1821 meters above sea level.

In his travel book, In Search of King Solomon's Mines, Tahir Shah described Mendi in the late 20th century as a town with "a muddy main street", lined with "buildings with corrugated iron roofs and cement walls". He stops in a bar where "kerosene and sawdust had been sprinkled on the floor to keep away the flies."

== History ==
Dejazmach constructed a church in Mendi in 1893. However, when the Dejazmach regained his rights to levy taxes over his father's former kingdom in 1907, the central government excepted the "gate" of Mendi, which was retained to the customs office in Nekemte. "This sealed the right of the centre to fiscal control over Nekemte, a right that Addis Abeba was never to abandon in the years to come."

By the 1930s, Mendi had become an important market of coffee. It attracted the attention of a Swedish pastor who established a mission there. The missionaries were accused of wrongdoing by the local Ethiopian priest to the Italians in 1938, who eventually expelled them; the Swedish mission was not revived until 1946. Mendi hosted a conference of Ethiopian Evangelical Churches in January 1954; the mission had to confront Muslim missionaries from Sudan in the next year, who converted 1000 people in a neighboring locale.

John Young believes that "at least a small contingent of the OLF is able to operate in the Mendi area ... on a semi-permanent basis" since the 2005 Ethiopian general election.

== Demographics ==
Based on figures from the Central Statistical Agency in 2005, Mendi has an estimated total population of 18,020 of whom 9,199 are men and 8,821 are women. The 1994 census reported this town had a total population of 10,070 of whom 4,989 were males and 5,081 were females.

== Climate ==
Climate data for Mendi, elevation 1,650 m (5,410 ft)
| Month | Jan | Feb | Mar | Apr | May | Jun | Jul | Aug | Sep | Oct | Nov | Dec | Year |
|---|---|---|---|---|---|---|---|---|---|---|---|---|---|
| Mean daily maximum °C (°F) | 28.3 (82.9) | 29.5 (85.1) | 30.2 (86.4) | 29.7 (85.5) | 26.8 (80.2) | 24.3 (75.7) | 22.6 (72.7) | 23.5 (74.3) | 24.1 (75.4) | 24.8 (76.6) | 25.5 (77.9) | 27.1 (80.8) | 26.4 (79.5) |
| Daily mean °C (°F) | 20.5 (68.9) | 21.5 (70.7) | 22.5 (72.5) | 22.6 (72.7) | 21.3 (70.3) | 19.6 (67.3) | 18.2 (64.8) | 18.5 (65.3) | 19.2 (66.6) | 19.2 (66.6) | 19.2 (66.6) | 19.5 (67.1) | 20.1 (68.3) |
| Mean daily minimum °C (°F) | 12.6 (54.7) | 14.0 (57.2) | 15.0 (59.0) | 15.5 (59.9) | 15.3 (59.5) | 14.6 (58.3) | 14.1 (57.4) | 14.1 (57.4) | 14.0 (57.2) | 13.6 (56.5) | 13.6 (56.5) | 12.6 (54.7) | 14.1 (57.4) |
| Average precipitation mm (inches) | 4 (0.2) | 6 (0.2) | 26 (1.0) | 67 (2.6) | 164 (6.5) | 303 (11.9) | 307 (12.1) | 309 (12.2) | 302 (11.9) | 129 (5.1) | 29 (1.1) | 6 (0.2) | 1,652 (65) |
| Average relative humidity (%) | 48 | 48 | 48 | 50 | 73 | 82 | 84 | 86 | 77 | 73 | 67 | 57 | 66 |
Source: FAO
