= Soddu Airport =

Airport in Ethiopia

Sodo Airport
- IATA: SXU; ICAO: HASD

Summary
- Serves: Sodo
- Elevation AMSL: 6,400 ft (2,000 m)
- Coordinates: 6°50′N 37°46′E

Map
- Location of the airport in Ethiopia

Runways
Direction	Length		Surface
Direction	ft	m	Surface
	6,235	1,900
- Sources: Great Circle Mapper

Sodo Airport (IATA: SXU, ICAO: HASD) is an airport that has served Wolaita Sodo, a city in Wolaita Zone, Ethiopia. The airport is located 10 km (6 miles) to northern part of the city. Currently, the airport is not operational and its reconstruction started in 2022.

== Accidents and incidents ==
November 20, 1974 - An Ethiopian Airlines Douglas C-47A, registration ET-AAR, that was due to fly a domestic passenger service to Beica, crashed on take-off. There were 24 occupants on board; both the pilot and the co-pilot perished in the accident.

October 15, 1978 - Due to the loss of hydraulic pressure, an Ethiopian Airlines Douglas C-47B, registration ET-AGK, was diverted to the airport. The engines were cut out following landing, and the aircraft ended up in a drainage ditch. There were no fatalities, but the aircraft was written off.

== See also ==
- List of airports in Ethiopia
