= Negele Borana =

Town in Oromia Region, Ethiopia

Negelle Borena ነጌሌ ቦረና
- Town
- Location within Ethiopia
- Coordinates: 5°20′N 39°35′E
- Country: Ethiopia
- Region: Oromia
- Zone: East Borana
- Elevation: 1,475 m (4,839 ft)

Population (2007)
  - Total: 35,264
- Time zone: UTC+3 (EAT)

Negele Borana (Amharic: ነጌሌ ቦረና) is a town and separate woreda in southern Ethiopia. Located on the road connecting Addis Ababa to Moyale, it is the capital of the newly-established East Borana Zone of the Oromia Region. Negelle Borana is the largest city traditionally inhabited by the Borana Oromo. It has a latitude and longitude of 5°20′N 39°35′E with an altitude of about 1,475 meters above sea level. It is surrounded by Liben woreda.

== Overview ==
The town is reported to have telephone service, a post office and electricity, as well as at least one primary and one secondary school, but no financial institutions. The electrical power was introduced by a branch of the Ethiopian Electric Light and Power Authority (EELPA), and in January 1961 a diesel-driven 120 kW electric power plant for the town was completed. A 2004 report states that Negele Borana is supplied with electricity by the Ethiopian Electric Power Corporation (the successor utility to the EELPA) from the national grid. There is also an airport. Negele Borana Military Base, an important installation of the Ethiopian Army, is located to the northeast of the city. A barrack revolt at this base on 12 January 1974 marked the beginning of the Ethiopian Revolution that overthrew the monarchy of Haile Selassie.

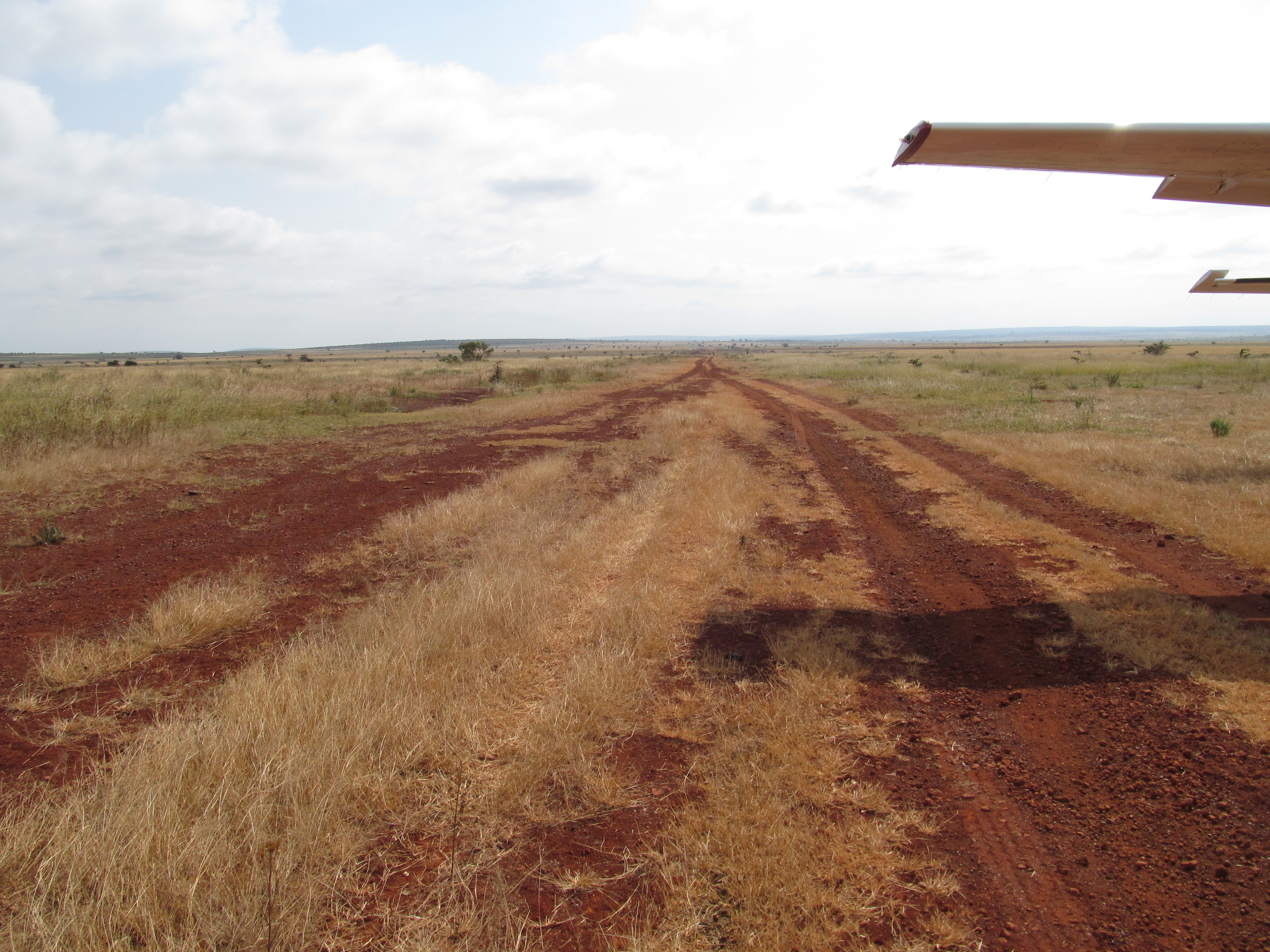
Negele Airport

Philip Briggs describes Negele Borana as "something of a frontier town, a cultural boiling pot that is predominantly Oromo but also has strong Somali, and Muslim influences. ... Negele Borana's distinctive character and cultural blend are personified in one of the most lively and absorbing markets in East Africa -- especially on Sundays when the camel market is held."

== History ==
The town of Negele Borana was founded in the early 20th century; the Swedish doctor F. Hylander described it in 1934 as an "Amhara new settlement and fortress with palisades", which was "the farthest outpost towards Jubbaland".

At the beginning of the Second Italo-Ethiopian War from 4 October 1935, Negele Borana served as the headquarters of Ras Desta Damtew. The Italians subjected the town to frequent bombing raids. The Italians under General Rodolfo Graziani captured the town shortly after their victory at the Battle of Ganale Dorya, which further weakened the southern Ethiopian defenses.

The town was occupied by the British Gold Coast Brigade on 27 March 1941, who had pushed north from Dolo. The British colonial unit found that the Italians had abandoned the settlement 10 days before they arrived, and in the time between the buildings had been looted and destroyed by the neighboring Borena Oromo. By the time David Buxton visited Negele Borana in 1943, he found that a battalion of the Ethiopian Army had garrisoned this "half-built Italian settlement".

The Norwegian Lutheran Mission operated a station in Negele Borana from 1949. Their most important activity was to start a hospital for the town in one of the abandoned Italian buildings, which they operated until 1956 when the Ministry of Public Health took it over. In 1958, Negele Borana was one of 27 places in Ethiopia ranked as First Class Township.

On 12 January 1974, enlisted men and non-commissioned officers of the Fourth Brigade stationed at the Military Base protested over their substandard living conditions. "There was nothing new about discontent among soldiers serving in the desolate conditions in these far-flung garrisons," note Marina and David Ottaway. "The heat was unbearable, the food barely edible, and the water was bad or in short supply". The last straw was when the officers refused to let the soldiers use their well after their own water pump broke down. The soldiers arrested their superior officers and petitioned Emperor Haile Selassie for redress of their grievances. The Emperor sent Lieutenant-General Deresse Dubale to investigate the matter; the mutineers took him prisoner, forced him to eat and drink as they did, then tied him up and put him under a tree for eight hours while they negotiated with the defense ministry. Furious, the Emperor sent two bombers to overfly the garrison and intimidate them to release Deresse, but did not punish the soldiers. The whole incident was hushed up for a while.

During the Ogaden War, the Somali Army attempted to capture Negele Borana throughout August 1977, but the local garrison was able to beat back the attacks.

Rights activists in southern Oromia reported to Human Rights Watch that students, farmers, and business people had been detained in Negele Borana. As of 25 January 2010 several hundred people, mostly affiliated with the Oromo People's Congress, were said to be still incarcerated in Negele borana jail. These arrests reportedly were in response to protests about the activities of mining companies in the region, which the authorities attributed to the opposition.

== Climate ==
Negele Borana has an altitude-moderated hot semi-arid climate (Köppen BSh), resembling Kenya rather than more northerly parts of Ethiopia. There are two short wet seasons in April-May and October-November, and these four months combine for 445 millimetres (17.52 in) of a total annual rainfall of 550 millimetres (21.65 in). Temperatures are much milder than usual for a hot semi-arid climate: afternoons are very warm and mornings comfortable all year round: in fact Negele Borana is only 1 °C or 1.8 °F above being classified as a cool semi-arid climate (BSk).

Climate data for Negele, elevation 1,544 m (5,066 ft)
| Month | Jan | Feb | Mar | Apr | May | Jun | Jul | Aug | Sep | Oct | Nov | Dec | Year |
|---|---|---|---|---|---|---|---|---|---|---|---|---|---|
| Mean daily maximum °C (°F) | 28.3 (82.9) | 29.0 (84.2) | 28.7 (83.7) | 25.6 (78.1) | 24.0 (75.2) | 22.2 (72.0) | 22.5 (72.5) | 23.8 (74.8) | 26.0 (78.8) | 25.2 (77.4) | 25.7 (78.3) | 27.0 (80.6) | 25.7 (78.2) |
| Daily mean °C (°F) | 20.2 (68.4) | 21.2 (70.2) | 21.6 (70.9) | 20.2 (68.4) | 19.5 (67.1) | 18.2 (64.8) | 17.8 (64.0) | 18.6 (65.5) | 19.5 (67.1) | 19.1 (66.4) | 19.2 (66.6) | 19.7 (67.5) | 19.6 (67.2) |
| Mean daily minimum °C (°F) | 11.3 (52.3) | 13.1 (55.6) | 13.8 (56.8) | 14.8 (58.6) | 14.8 (58.6) | 13.5 (56.3) | 12.6 (54.7) | 12.3 (54.1) | 13.1 (55.6) | 13.6 (56.5) | 12.5 (54.5) | 11.8 (53.2) | 13.1 (55.6) |
| Average precipitation mm (inches) | 13 (0.5) | 32 (1.3) | 58 (2.3) | 225 (8.9) | 168 (6.6) | 9 (0.4) | 7 (0.3) | 6 (0.2) | 44 (1.7) | 180 (7.1) | 60 (2.4) | 10 (0.4) | 812 (32.1) |
| Average relative humidity (%) | 58 | 54 | 57 | 65 | 68 | 75 | 75 | 72 | 66 | 70 | 64 | 58 | 65 |
Source: FAO

== Demographics ==
The 2007 national census reported a total population for this town of 35,264, of whom 18,351 were men and 16,913 were women. The majority of the inhabitants said they were Muslim, with 54.89% of the population reporting they observed this belief, while 34.25% of the population practiced Ethiopian Orthodox Christianity, 8.24% were Protestant, and 2.34% practiced traditional beliefs. The 1994 national census reported this town had a total population of 23,997 of whom 12,036 were men and 11,961 women.
