= Dodola, Oromia =

Dodola ዶዶላ
- Town
- Location within Ethiopia
- Coordinates: 6°59′N 39°11′E
- Country: Ethiopia
- Region: (Oromia Region) Oromia
- Zone: West Arsi Zone

Population
  - Total: 110,000
- Time zone: UTC+3 (EAT)

Dodola is a town in southeastern Ethiopia. Located in the West Arsi Zone of the Oromia State, this town has a latitude and longitude of 06°59′N 39°11′E, with an elevation ranging from 2362 to 2493 meters above sea level. It is the administrative center of Dodola Aanaa.

The town is served by Dodola Airport.

== History ==
Arnold Weinholt Hodson passed through Dodola when he was the British resident in southern Ethiopia (1914-1923). The Italian Guida described Dodola in 1938 as a town with an important market in an area rich in resources of agriculture and forest, and having 150 inhabitants. The Guida further mentioned the village church of Kidane Mihret as a notable landmark.

The road to Dodola built by the Italian occupants had fallen into disrepair by the time of the Bale revolt. However, a telephone landline to the town was in operation by 1964.

The Ethiopian Ministry of Education gave permission on 21 March 1949 to a group of Danish missionaries to establish a station at Dodola, but due to funding issues the mission was not started until 1952. The mission included a school and a clinic. Over the following years the station had a constant problem with retaining staff, but by 1971 it had secured support from the Lutheran World Federation.

== Demographics ==
Based on figures from the Central Statistical Agency in 2005, Dodola has an estimated total population of 24,767 of whom 12,444 are men and 12,323 are women. The 1994 national census reported this town had a total population of 13,847 of whom 6,749 were men and 7,098 were women.

== Administration ==
The city is administered by the Dodola City Mayor's Office, which oversees urban development, public services, and local governance for residents of Dodola and surrounding communities. The Mayor's Office coordinates with the West Arsi Zone administration and the Oromia Regional State on matters of urban planning, infrastructure development, and delivery of essential public services to residents.
