= Debre Tabor Airport =

Airport in Debre Tabor, Amhara Region, Ethiopia

- IATA: DBT; ICAO: HADT

Summary
- Serves: Debre Tabor
- Location: Ethiopia
- Elevation AMSL: 8,465 ft / 2,580 m
- Coordinates: 11°53′06″N 38°00′32″E
- Interactive map of Debre Tabor Airport

Runways
Direction	Length		Surface
Direction	ft	m	Surface
		1,300

Debre Tabor Airport is an airport in the town of Debre Tabor, in northern Ethiopia (IATA: DBT, ICAO: HADT).

== History ==
=== Conquest by the Tigray Defense Forces ===
As part of its counter-offensive in the Tigray War, on 18 August 2021, the Tigray People's Liberation Front tried to take control of Debre Tabor Airport but failed.
