= Mizan Teferi Airport =

Airport in South West Ethiopia People's Region, Ethiopia

- IATA: MTF; ICAO: HAMT

Summary
- Elevation AMSL: 4,396 ft / 1,340 m
- Coordinates: 6°57′27″N 35°33′18″E

Map
- Location of the airport in Ethiopia.

Helipads
Number	Length		Surface
Number	ft	m	Surface
	4,055	1,236
- Great Circle Mapper

Mizan Teferi Airport (IATA: MTF, ICAO: HAMT) is an airport in the town of Mizan Teferi, in southwestern Ethiopia.
