= Beica Airport =

Airport in Ethiopia

Coordinates: 9°23′31″N 34°31′09″E

Beica Airport was an airport serving the town of Beica (or Begi), in south-western Ethiopia (IATA: BEI, ICAO: HABE). Located at an elevation of 1,649 meters above sea level, this airport has one unpaved runway that is 1,331 meters long. As of 2009, it is abandoned.
