= Shilavo Airport =

Airport in Ethiopia

Coordinates: 6°04′40″N 44°45′50″E

Shilavo Airport is an airport in the town of Shilavo, in eastern Ethiopia (IATA: HIL, ICAO: HASL). It has a single unpaved runway.
