= Mekane Selam Airport =

- IATA: MKS; ICAO: HAMA

Summary
- Airport type: Public
- Location: Mekane Selam, Ethiopia
- Coordinates: 10°43′28″N 38°44′29″E

Map
- Location of airport in Ethiopia

Runways
Direction	Length		Surface
Direction	m	ft	Surface
	1,500	4,921	Unpaved

Mekane Selam Airport (IATA: MKS, ICAO: HAMA) is an airport serving Mekane Selam, a town in the Debub Wollo (or "South Wollo") zone of the Amhara region in central Ethiopia. The airport's only runway is approximately 1,500 metres (4,921 ft) in length.
