= Mekane Selam =

Mekane Selam መካነ ሰላም
- Location in Ethiopia
- Coordinates: 10°44′57″N 38°45′38″E
- Country: Ethiopia
- Region: Amhara Region
- Zone: South Wollo Zone
- Elevation: 1,827 m (5,994 ft)

Population (2005)
  - Total: 8,481 (est)
- Time zone: UTC+3 (EAT)

Mekane Selam (Amharic: መካነ ሰላም) is a town in central Ethiopia. Located in the South Wollo Zone of the Amhara Region, this town has a latitude and longitude of 10°45′N 38°45′E with an elevation of 2638 meters above sea level. It is the administrative center of Borena woreda. The city is bordered by Eastern Gojjam in the west, Kelala and Wogide in the south, Leganbo (Akesta) in the east and Sayint (Agibar) in the north.

Mekane Selam hosts an airport ( IATA code MKS) with an unpaved runway, the former destination of scheduled flights by Ethiopian Airlines. The airport has not been operational for the last 20 and above years. It is also reportedly the western most community accessible by car in Wollo. The nearby geology is characterized by an outcropping of basaltic rocks that have been reused in local buildings.

== History ==
The Swedish geologist Erik Nilsson visited Mekane Selam (which he called Agibar) during the first half of 1933, where he spent some time with the province's governor, Dejazmach Workneh.

Mekane Selam was the site where 8,000 Italian soldiers surrendered in May 1941. These were the remnants of 51 battalions which had managed to escape from Gojjam ahead of Gideon Force and were trapped in the town when Wilfred Thesiger completed a 50-mile march in 24 hours with his men and seized the ridge connecting two hills the Italians had intended to use for their retreat.

== Demographics ==
Based on 2005 figures from the Central Statistical Agency, Mekane Selam has an estimated total population of 8,481 of whom 4,119 were males and 4,362 were females. The 1994 census reported this town had a total population of 4,901 of whom 2,167 were males and 2,734 were females.
