= Wacca Airport =

Airport in Ethiopia

Coordinates: 7.16700°N 37.16700°E

Wacca Airport (IATA: WAC, ICAO: HAWC) (also known as Tarche Soddo) is an Ethiopian airfield in Wacca, South West Ethiopia Peoples' Region. It has an unpaved runway, with a length of about 1,200 meters. Records at the Nordic Africa Institute website show it already was in existence in the 1970s.
