= Gore Airport =

Airport in Ethiopia

- IATA: GOR; ICAO: HAGR

Summary
- Airport type: Public
- Serves: Gore, Oromia
- Elevation AMSL: 6,580 ft / 2,006 m
- Coordinates: 8°09′40″N 35°33′10″E

Map
- Location of the airport in Ethiopia

Runways
Direction	Length		Surface
Direction	ft	m	Surface
03/21	3,840	1,170	Grass
- Source: Google Maps

Gore Airport (IATA: GOR, ICAO: HAGR) is a public airport serving the town of Gore in south-western Ethiopia.

== Airlines and destinations ==
Airlines	Destinations
Ethiopian Airlines	Addis Ababa

== See also ==
- Transport in Ethiopia
