= Gambela Airport =

Airport in Gambela Region, Ethiopia

- IATA: GMB; ICAO: HAGM

Summary
- Airport type: Public
- Operator: Ethiopian Airports Enterprise
- Serves: Gambela, Ethiopia
- Elevation AMSL: 1,771 ft (540 m)
- Coordinates: 08°07′43″N 034°33′47″E

Map
- Location within Ethiopia

Runways
Direction	Length		Surface
Direction	m	ft	Surface
18/36	2,514	8,248	Concrete

Gambela Airport (IATA: GMB, ICAO: HAGM) is a public airport serving Gambela, the capital city of the Gambela Region in western Ethiopia. The name of the city and airport may also be transliterated as Gambella. The airport is located 17 km (11 miles) south of the city. It also serves the Gambela National Park, which is Ethiopia's largest national park.

== Facilities ==
The airport resides at an elevation of 1,771 feet (540 m) above mean sea level. It has one runway designated 18/36 with a concrete surface measuring 2,514 by 45 metres (8,248 ft × 148 ft).

== Airlines and destinations ==
Airlines	Destinations
Ethiopian Airlines	Addis Ababa
