= Aba Segud Airport =

Airport in Oromia Region, Ethiopia

Aba Jifa Airport Jimma Airport
- IATA: JIM; ICAO: HAJM

Summary
- Airport type: Public
- Owner: Ethiopian Civil Aviation Authority
- Operator: Ethiopian Airports Enterprise
- Serves: Jimma, Ethiopia
- Elevation AMSL: 5,587 ft (1,703 m)
- Coordinates: 07°39′57″N 036°48′59″E

Map
- Location in Ethiopia (Oromia region in red)

Runways
Direction	Length		Surface
Direction	m	ft	Surface
13/31	3,300	10,827	Asphalt

Aba Jifar Airport (IATA: JIM, ICAO: HAJM), also known as Jimma Airport, is a public airport serving Jimma, a city in the Oromia Region of Ethiopia. The airport is located 2.5 km (1.6 miles) southwest of the city.

== Facilities ==
Operated by Ethiopian Airports Enterprise, the Aba Jifar Airport sits at an elevation of 5,587 feet (1,703 m) above mean sea level. The airport's only runway, designated 13/31, has an asphalt surface and measures 3,300 by 50 metres (10,827 ft × 164 ft).

== Airlines and destinations ==
Airlines	Destinations
Ethiopian Airlines	Addis Ababa, Dembidolo
