= Dembidolo Airport =

Airport in Oromia Region, Ethiopia

- IATA: DEM; ICAO: HADD

Summary
- Airport type: Public
- Serves: Dembidolo
- Elevation AMSL: 5,200 ft / 1,585 m
- Coordinates: 8°33′15″N 34°51′30″E

Map
- Location of the airport in Ethiopia

Runways
Direction	Length		Surface
Direction	ft	m	Surface
15/33	4,400	1,340	Grass
- Source: Google Maps

Dembidolo Airport (IATA: DEM, ICAO: HADD) is a public airport in Dembidolo, Oromia Region, Ethiopia

Located 5 km (3.1 mi) from Dembidolo town, the airport lies at an elevation of 5,200 feet (1,585 m) above mean sea level.

Ethiopian Construction Works, Corporation Transport Infrastructure Construction Sector constructed the airport in asphalt and concrete at a cost of more than 176.7 million birr. The project included a runway, apron field, taxiway and taxiway strip, and was completed in June 2018.

== Airlines and destinations ==
=== Passenger ===
Airlines	Destinations
Ethiopian Airlines	Addis Ababa, Jimma
