= Addis Ababa Bole International Airport =

Airport in Ethiopia

Addis Ababa Bole International Airport አዲስ አበባ ቦሌ ዓለም አቀፍ አየር ማረፊያ
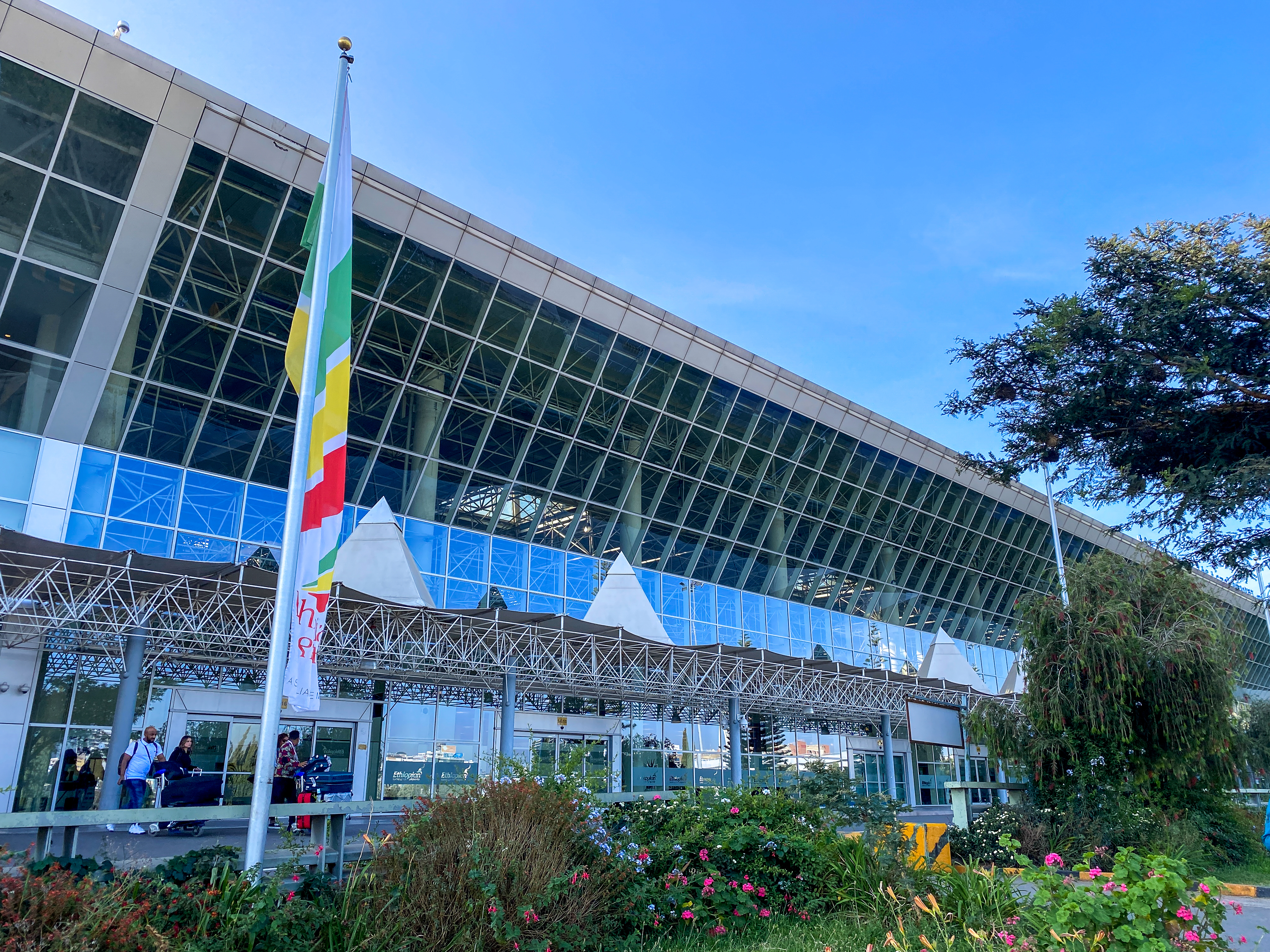
- Airport facade in 2022
- IATA: ADD; ICAO: HAAB

Summary
- Airport type: Public
- Owner: Ethiopian Airlines
- Operator: Ethiopian Airports Enterprise
- Serves: Addis Ababa, Ethiopia
- Location: Bole
- Opened: 1962; 64 years ago
- Hub for: Ethiopian Airlines
- Elevation AMSL: 2,334 m (7,657 ft)
- Coordinates: 08°58′40″N 38°47′58″E
- Website: Official website

Map
- Location of airport in Ethiopia

Runways
Direction	Length		Surface
Direction	m	ft	Surface
07R/25L	3,800	12,467	Asphalt
07L/25R	3,700	12,139	Asphalt

Statistics (2024)
- Passengers: 12,099,516 ▲11.0%
- Aircraft movements: 165,091 ▲16.5%
- Cargo (metric tonnes): 265,949 ▲7.1%
- Sources:Business Insiders Africa

Addis Ababa Bole International Airport (IATA: ADD, ICAO: HAAB) is an international airport in Addis Ababa, Ethiopia. It is in the Bole district, 6 km (3.7 mi) southeast of the city centre and 65 km (40 mi) north of Bishoftu. The airport was formerly known as Haile Selassie I International Airport. It is the main hub of Ethiopian Airlines, the national airline that serves destinations in Ethiopia and throughout the African continent, as well as connections to Asia, Europe, North America and South America. The airport is also the base of the Ethiopian Aviation Academy. As of June 2018, nearly 380 flights per day were using the airport. The airport is set to be replaced by a new hub at Bishoftu International Airport, with a projected completion in 2030.

== History ==
In 1960, Ethiopian Airlines realized the runway at Lideta was too short for its new jet aircraft, the Boeing 720. Thus a new airport was built at Bole.

By December 1962 the new runway and control tower were operational. In 1997, an expansion plan was announced for the airport. This expansion was done in three phases:

- Phase One: Adding a parallel runway and expanding the old runway.
- Phase Two: Construction of a brand new terminal with a large parking area, a shopping complex and restaurants.
- Phase Three: Construction of the 38-metre-tall (125 ft) control tower (double the height of the previous one) and installation of new electrical and fire-fighting equipment.

The expanded old runway and the new runway are capable of handling the Boeing 747 and Airbus A340 aircraft. The new parallel runway is connected by five entrances and exits to the old runway, which serves as a taxiway. The terminal houses a high tech security and baggage handling system built on more than 43,000 square meters of land. The terminal also has banks and duty-free shops. The new control tower was built in between Terminal 1 and Terminal 2, replacing the old control tower.

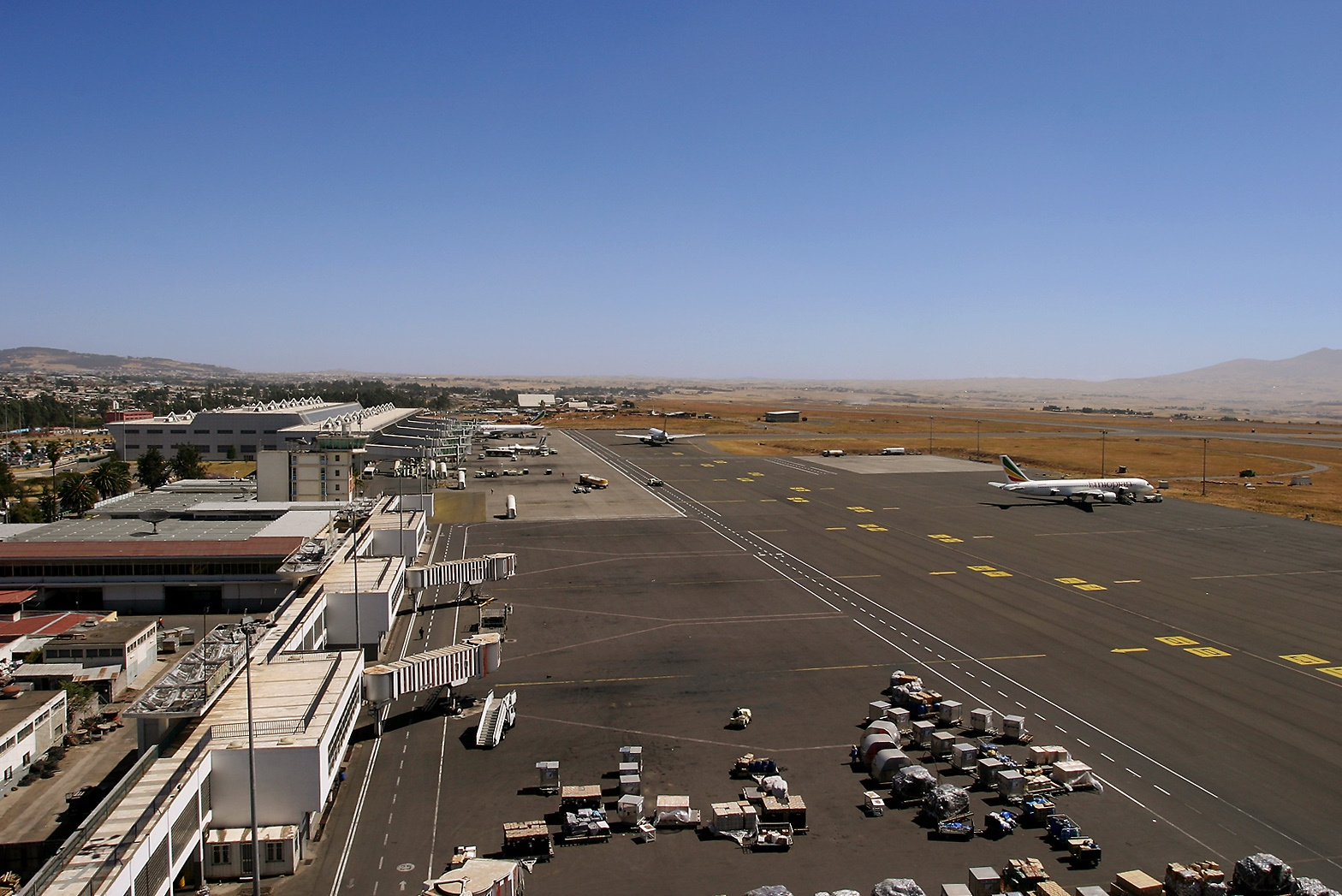
Aerial view of the airport in 2005

In 2003, the new international passenger terminal was opened, making it one of Africa's largest airport passenger terminals. The new terminal is capable of handling about 3,000 passengers an hour. This project was worth a total of 1.05 billion birr ($130 million). At the time, the airport was one of a number of airport terminal constructions that have been underway in Ethiopia.

In 2006, a new cargo terminal and maintenance hangar was opened five months late. This was because of expanded specifications to vastly improve Ethiopian Airlines' handling capacity and needs. The facility can accommodate three to four aircraft at a time. This project was worth a total of 340 million birr. At the same time, the first Airbus A380 arrived at the airport to undertake tests to validate its Engine Alliance GP7200 engines' performance from high-altitude airports. The airport is capable of accommodating the A380.

In 2010, the Ethiopian Airports Enterprise announced another expansion project worth $27.9 million at the airport. The project will include expansion of the aircraft parking capacity from 19 to 44 in order to accommodate heavier aircraft such as the Boeing 747 and Boeing 777. In the first phase of the project, 15 parking stands will be constructed and the remaining will be completed in the next phase. The expansion will help in easing air traffic congestion due to an increase in international travel. This would lead to the new expansion plan in 2012.

=== Expansion ===
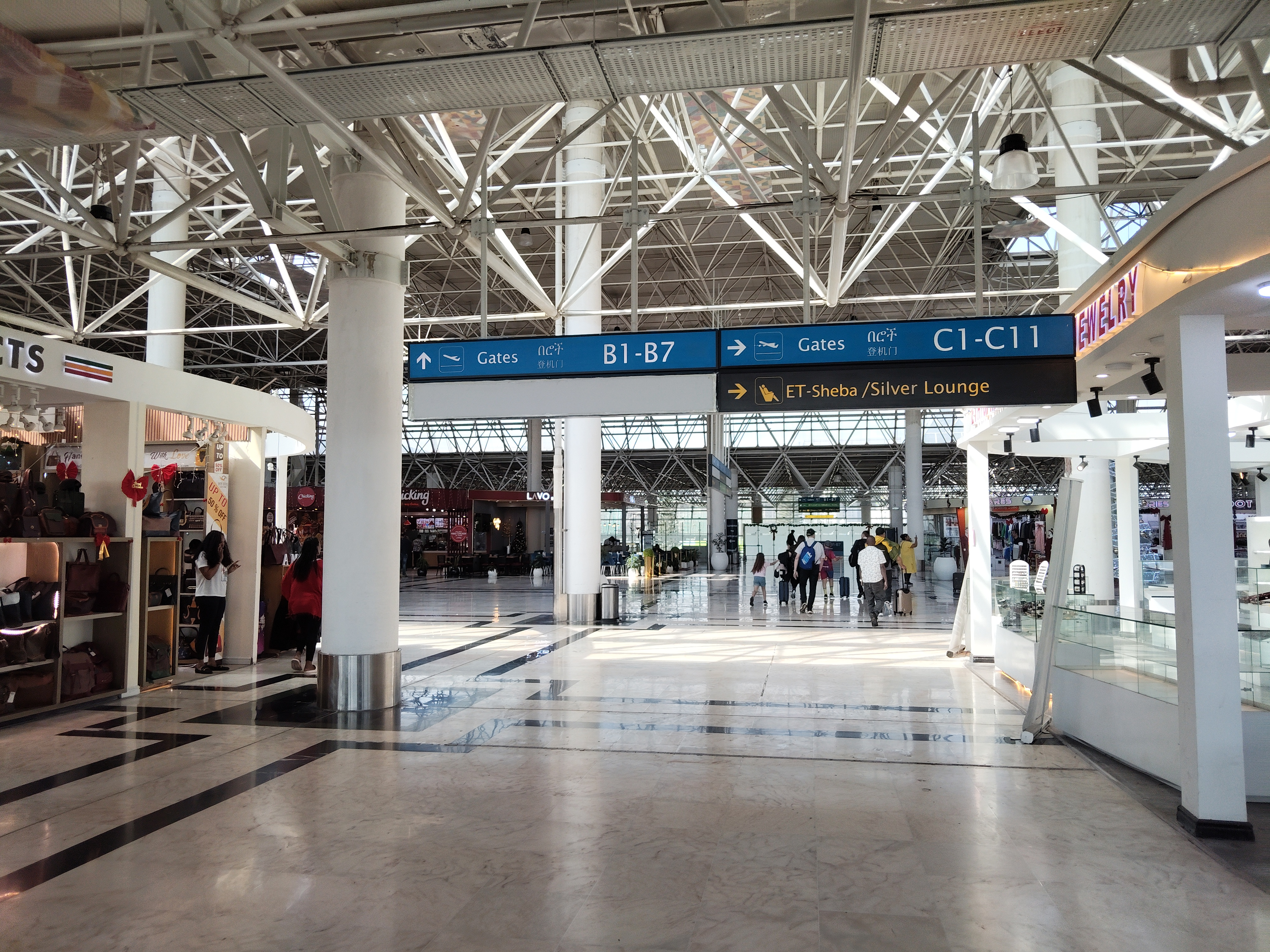
Airport interior in 2024

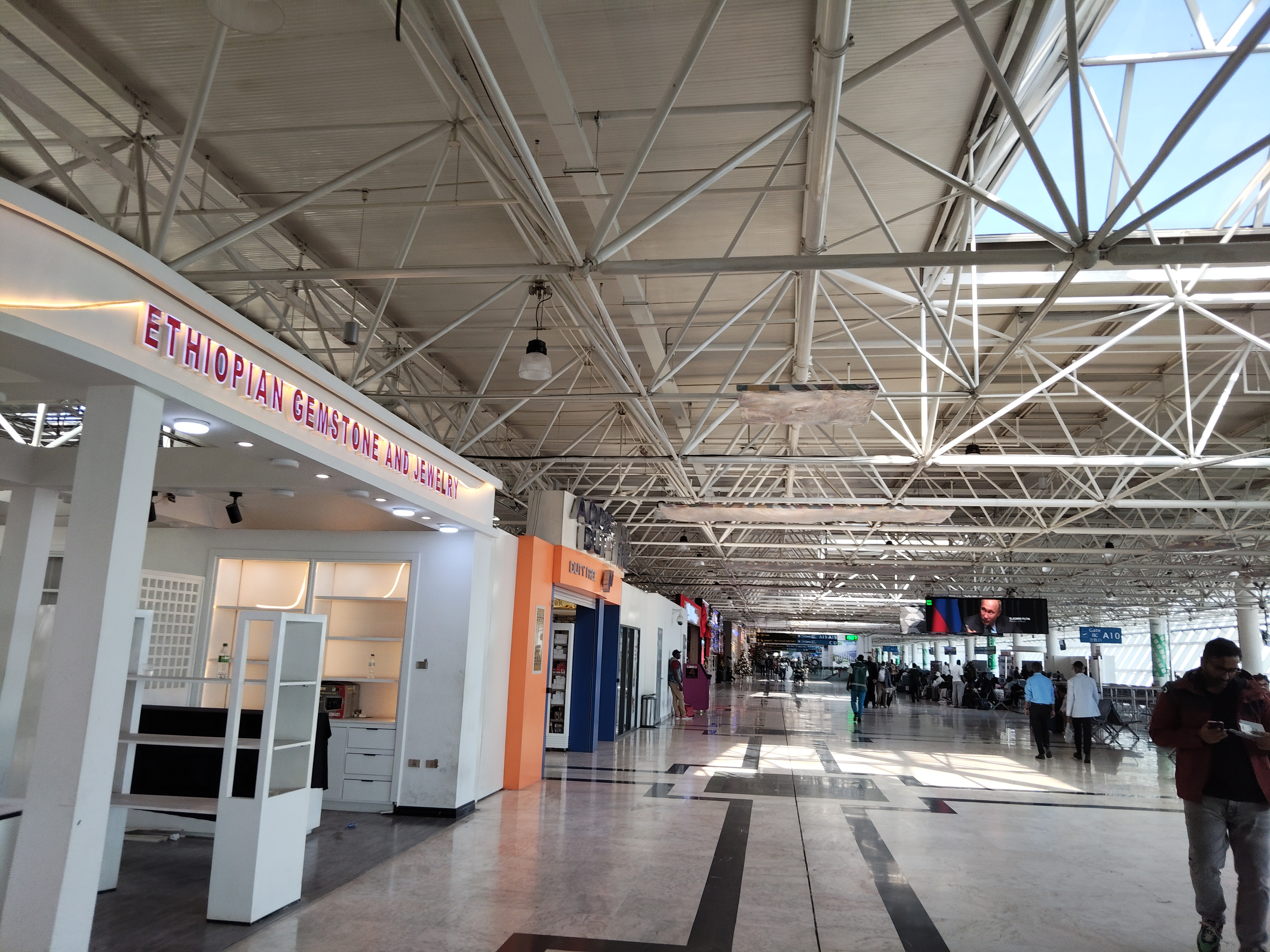
Departure concourse

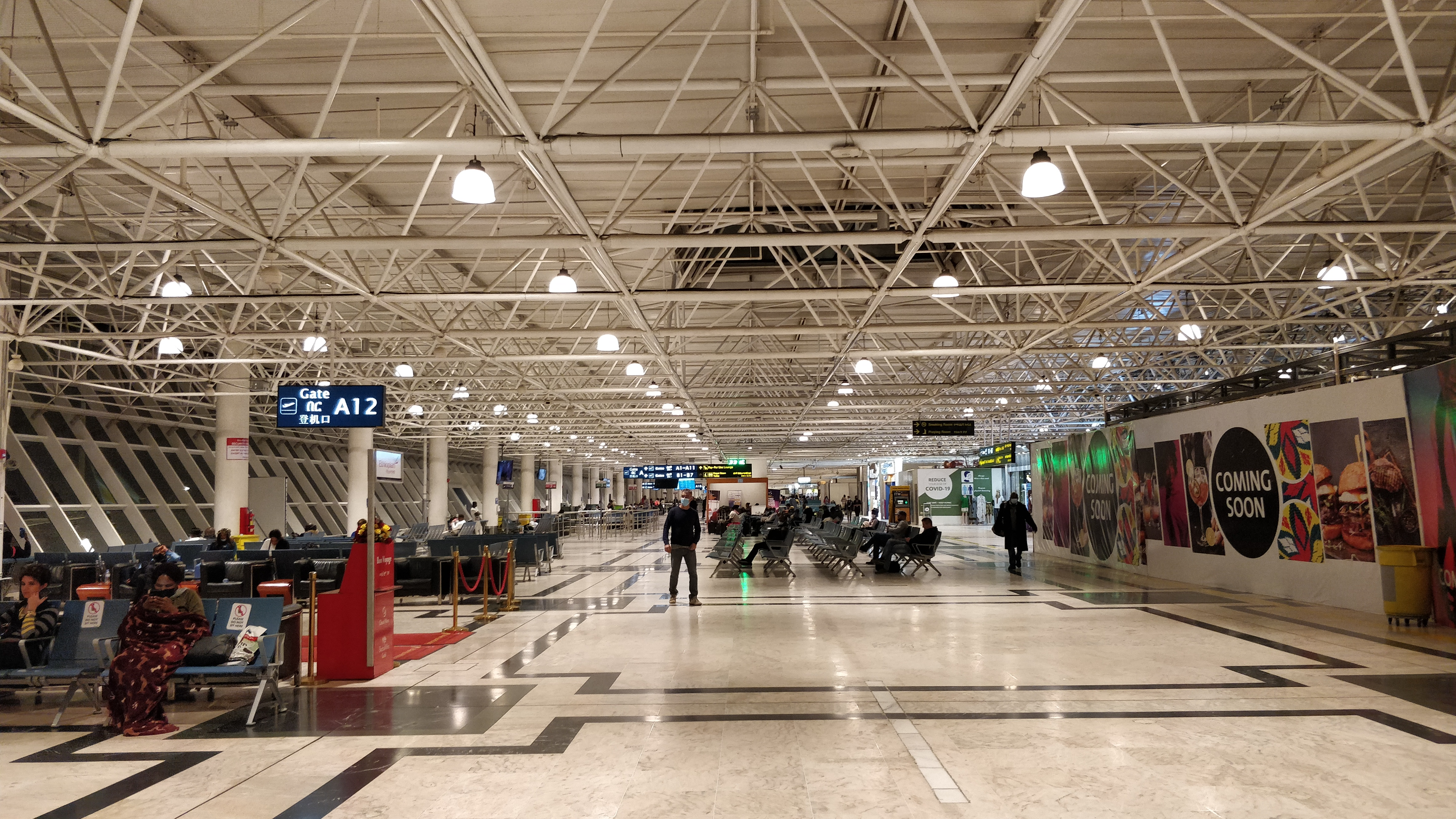
Departure area in 2021

Expansion of the passenger terminal, cargo and maintenance facilities, the runway and construction of the hotel was completed by Singaporean companies between 2022 and 2026 as part of a phased opening strategy.

The expansion work is being undertaken in two phases on an 80-hectare (200-acre) site. The first phase of the expansion work had enabled the airport to accommodate 15 additional aircraft, reducing traffic congestion at the airport. The second phase of the expansion work will enable the airport to service 10 additional aircraft. The airport will be able to service a total of 44 aircraft upon the completion of the expansion. The airport also plans to expand the apron which purportedly can solve the persistent aircraft parking problem it faces particularly during large international conferences.

In 2012, expansion of the new passenger terminal was announced. The outlay of this expansion was projected at $250 million. At the same time, a new ramp was completed and can now park 24 aircraft. Another ramp is being built for 14 more aircraft. At the same time, the first phase of expanding the taxiways and adding more aircraft parking was completed. Eventually, this will lead to the expansion of the terminal. This all falls in line with Ethiopian Airlines' plan, "Vision 2025".

According to the CEO of Ethiopian Airlines, the east wing of the newly expanded airport was expected to be operational by the end of June 2018. The whole expansion project was completed by the end of 2018, enabling the airport to accommodate up to 22 million passengers per year. As of 23 January 2020 the extension is still not fully completed. The new check in area and the elevated road to it are not yet open.

On 27 January 2019, Ethiopian Prime Minister Abiy Ahmed inaugurated the expansion to Terminal 2.

The former Prime Minister Hailemariam Desalegn had purportedly given permission to build a new international airport in the town of Mojo, 65 kilometres (40 mi) south of the capital's current airport. The senior official at the Ethiopian Airport Enterprise said that the officials of the enterprise and the Ministry of Transport briefed the Prime Minister about the planned grand airport project. Two other sites were also options.

The airport has two terminals with a total of around 69 gates. Terminal 1 has 10 gates and Terminal 2 has around 50 gates. Terminal 1 serves domestic flights, while Terminal 2 serves international flights.

== Airlines and destinations ==
=== Passenger ===
General source:

Airlines	Destinations
Air Algérie	Algiers
Air Arabia	Sharjah
China Southern Airlines	Changsha, Guangzhou
EgyptAir	Cairo
Emirates	Dubai–International
Ethiopian Airlines	Abidjan, Abu Dhabi, Abuja, Accra, Amman–Queen Alia, Antananarivo, Arba Minch, Asosa, Athens, Atlanta, (Note: Some of these flights make a stopover at Rome–Fiumicino for refueling. However, while Ethiopian Airlines sells separate tickets between Addis Ababa and Rome–Fiumicino, Ethiopian does not sell tickets solely between Addis Ababa and Rome–Fiumicino on flights bound to Atlanta, Chicago–O'Hare, Newark, Toronto–Pearson, or Washington–Dulles, nor does Ethiopian sell tickets solely between Rome–Fiumicino and Atlanta, Chicago–O'Hare, Newark, Toronto–Pearson, or Washington–Dulles.) Awasa, Axum, Bahir Dar, Bahrain, Bamako, Bangkok–Suvarnabhumi, Bangui, Beira, Beirut, Bengaluru, Blantyre, Bosaso, Brazzaville, Brussels, Buenos Aires–Ezeiza, Bujumbura, Bulawayo, Cairo, Cape Town, Chengdu–Tianfu, Chennai, Chicago–O'Hare, Conakry, Cotonou, Copenhagen, Dakar–Diass, Debre Markos, Dammam, Dar es Salaam, Delhi, Dembidolo, Dessie, Dhaka, Dire Dawa, Djibouti, Doha, Douala, Dubai–International, Durban (resumes 11 December 2026),Entebbe, Enugu, Frankfurt, Freetown, Gaborone, Gambella, Garowe, Geneva, Goba, Gore, Gode, Goma, Gondar, Guangzhou, Hanoi, Harare, Hargeisa, Hong Kong, Humera, Hyderabad, Istanbul, Jakarta–Soekarno-Hatta, Jizan, Jeddah, Jijiga, Jimma, Jinka, Johannesburg–O.R. Tambo, Juba, Kano, Karachi, Kigali, Kilimanjaro, Kinshasa–N'Djili, Kuala Lumpur–International, Kuwait City, Lagos, Lalibela, Libreville, Lilongwe, Livingstone, Lomé, London–Gatwick, London–Heathrow, Luanda, Lubumbashi, Lusaka, Lyon, Madrid, Mahé, Malabo, Manchester, Manila, Maputo, Marseille, Maun, Mek'ele, Milan–Malpensa, Mogadishu, Mombasa, Monrovia–Roberts, Moroni, Moscow–Domodedovo, Mumbai, Muscat, Nairobi–Jomo Kenyatta, N'Djamena, Ndola, Nekemte, Niamey, Nosy-Be, Oslo, Ouagadougou, Paris–Charles de Gaulle, Pointe-Noire, Porto, Port Harcourt (begins 1 December 2026), Port Sudan, Riyadh, Rome–Fiumicino, São Paulo–Guarulhos, Semera, Seoul–Incheon, Shanghai–Pudong, Sharjah, Singapore, Stockholm–Arlanda, Tel Aviv, Tokyo–Narita, Toronto–Pearson, Victoria Falls, Vienna, Warsaw–Chopin, Windhoek–Hosea Kutako, Yaoundé, Zanzibar, Zürich; Seasonal: Mauritius
Etihad Airways	Abu Dhabi
Flydubai	Dubai–International
Flynas	Abha, Jeddah, Riyadh
Jazeera Airways	Kuwait City
Kenya Airways	Nairobi–Jomo Kenyatta
Qatar Airways	Doha
RwandAir	Kigali
Saudia	Jeddah
Turkish Airlines	Istanbul
XiamenAir	Xiamen (begins 28 November 2026)
Yemenia	Aden

=== Cargo ===
Airlines	Destinations	Refs
Emirates SkyCargo	Dubai–Al Maktoum	
Ethiopian Cargo	Accra, Ahmedabad, Antananarivo, Beirut, Bengaluru, Bogotá, Brazzaville, Brussels, Bujumbura, Casablanca, Cairo, Chennai, Chongqing, Copenhagen, Delhi, Dhaka, Djibouti, Dubai–International, Enugu, Guangzhou, Hanoi, Hong Kong, Hyderabad, Jakarta–Soekarno-Hatta, Jeddah, Johannesburg–O. R. Tambo, Kigali, Kinshasa–N'Djili, Lagos, Liège, London–Heathrow, Luxembourg, Maastricht/Aachen, Mexico City–AFIA, Miami, Milan–Malpensa, Mumbai, Nanjing, Pointe-Noire, Santiago de Chile, São Paulo–Guarulhos, Ürümqi, Zaragoza	
Saudia Cargo	Jeddah	
Turkish Cargo	Istanbul	

== Accidents and incidents ==
- On 18 April 1972 at 09:40, an East African Airways Super VC-10 (registered 5X-UVA) crashed during take-off; 35 passengers were killed, as well as eight of the 11 crew. 13 were injured, and 48 uninjured.
- On 18 March 1980, Douglas C-47B ET-AGM of Ethiopian Airlines crashed while on a single-engined approach to Bole International Airport. The aircraft was on a training flight.
- On 10 March 2019, a Boeing 737 MAX 8 of Ethiopian Airlines operating as Ethiopian Airlines Flight 302 bound for Nairobi crashed shortly after takeoff from Bole International Airport. All 149 passengers and eight crew members on board perished. This crash was very similar to the crash of Lion Air Flight 610 five months earlier, as both planes were brand new 737 MAXs that crashed right after takeoff. Together, these two crashes led to the worldwide grounding of the Boeing 737 MAX for nearly two years.

== See also ==
- List of airports in Ethiopia
- List of the busiest airports in Africa
- Bishoftu International Airport
