= Kabri Dar Airport =

Airport in Ethiopia

- IATA: ABK; ICAO: HAKD

Summary
- Airport type: Public
- Operator: Ethiopian Airports Enterprise
- Serves: Kebri Dahar
- Coordinates: 6°43′58.1″N 44°14′29.6″E

Map
- Location of airport in Ethiopia

Runways
| Direction | Length | | Surface |
| Direction | m | ft | Surface |
|---|---|---|---|
| 08/26 | 2,500 | 8,202 | Concrete |

Kabri Dar Airport is a public airport in Kebri Dahar, in eastern Ethiopia (IATA: ABK, ICAO: HAKD). Located at an elevation of 549 metres (1,801 ft) above sea level, the facility has a 2,500-metre (8,200 ft) long concrete runway which is 46 metres (151 ft) wide.

== Airlines and destinations ==
| Airlines | Destinations |
|---|---|
| Ethiopian Airlines | Jijiga (Suspended since January 2026) |

== Accidents and incidents ==
On 12 June 1977, a Douglas C-47A ET-AAP of Ethiopian Airlines was reported to have been damaged beyond economic repair in a landing accident when the port undercarriage collapsed.
