= Debre Markos Airport =

Airport in Debre Markos, Amhara Region, Ethiopia

- IATA: DBM; ICAO: HADM

Summary
- Serves: Debre Markos
- Location: Ethiopia
- Elevation AMSL: 2,480 m (8,140 ft)
- Coordinates: 10°19′N 37°44′E
- Interactive map of Debre Markos Airport

Runways
Direction	Length		Surface
Direction	ft	m	Surface
		1,300

Debre Markos Airport is an airport in the city of Debre Markos, in northern Ethiopia (IATA: DBM, ICAO: HADM).

== Airlines and destinations ==
Airlines	Destinations
Ethiopian Airlines	Addis Ababa
