= Tippi Airport =

- IATA: TIE; ICAO: HATP

Summary
- Location: Tippi, Ethiopia
- Elevation AMSL: 4,068 ft / 1,240 m
- Coordinates: 7°12′9″N 35°24′54″E
- Interactive map of Tippi Airport

Runways
Direction	Length		Surface
Direction	ft	m	Surface
	4,272	1,302

Tippi Airport was an airport in Tippi, Ethiopia. Located at an elevation of 1,240 meters above sea level, it had one unpaved 1,302 meters long runway. As of 2014, the airport is no longer in use, and the runway serves other purposes.
