= Begi (town) =

Town in Oromia Region, Ethiopia

Begi Begii
- Town
- Location within Ethiopia
- Coordinates: 9°20′N 34°29′E
- Country: Ethiopia
- Region: Oromia
- Zone: West Welega
- Woreda: Begi
- Elevation: 1,673 m (5,489 ft)

Population (2005)
  - Total: 6,106
- Time zone: UTC+3 (EAT)
- Climate: Aw

Begi is a town in south-western Ethiopia. Located in the West Welega Zone of the Oromia Region, the town has a latitude and longitude of 9°20′N 34°29′E with an elevation of 1673 meters above sea level. Begi is the administrative center of Begi woreda. As of 2005, the woreda is divided into two districts: Begi and Qondaala.

Begi has enjoyed telephone service since the 1930s. The school in Begi started in 1953 as an elementary school (grades one through six), and in 1975 was upgraded to a junior secondary school, also offering education in grades seven and eight. The town also hosted an unpaved airfield with regular flights by Ethiopian Airlines, now abandoned and in state of disrepair, and has postal service.

== History ==
The Dutch explorer Juan Maria Schuver visited Begi during his first explorations between the White and Blue Niles (August 1881). He described the settlement as "a large village" that was recovering from a recent famine, but at the time of his visit "with extensive plantations of durra, maize, angolib (a species of edible, sweet durra-stalk) and cabbage. Every house had its small garden of tobacco, beans, yams and shieta, the minute red pepper."

By the 1930s, Begi had become the seat of Sheikh Hojele, governor of Benishangul (then part of Gojjam Province), and the major town of that region. Gold was reported to be found in the area. During the Italian occupation, the governor was Sheikh Abd al-Khair.

The Oromo Liberation Front held their first national congress in Begi February, 1988, having taken control of much of the Ethiopian territory along the Sudan border.

When the Benishangul-Gumuz and Oromia regions were established in 1992, the two regions disputed ownership of Begi, both wanting ownership. Benishangul-Gumuz's claim was based on two assertions: the first one was that Begi and its territory had been part of the domain of Sheikh Hojele; the second was that the earliest known inhabitants of the area were the Mao and Kwama peoples, which were ethnic groups assigned to Benishangul-Gumuz. To resolve this dispute, the Transitional Government of Ethiopia organized a referendum in 1994; the majority of voters decided in favor of joining Oromia, and Begi was placed under that region later that year.

On 18 October 2006, Begi and Gidami were the setting for clashes between Muslims and Protestant Christians, resulting in 9 deaths, including the death of two Protestant preachers, and over 100 injured. In addition, 21 churches, one mosque, and dozens of houses were burned, leaving over 400 people homeless.

== Demographics ==
Based on 2005 figures from the Central Statistical Agency, Begi has an estimated total population of 6,106 of whom 3,033 were males and 3,073 were females. The 1994 census reported this town had a total population of 3,415 of whom 1,645 were males and 1,770 were females.
