= Transport in Eritrea =

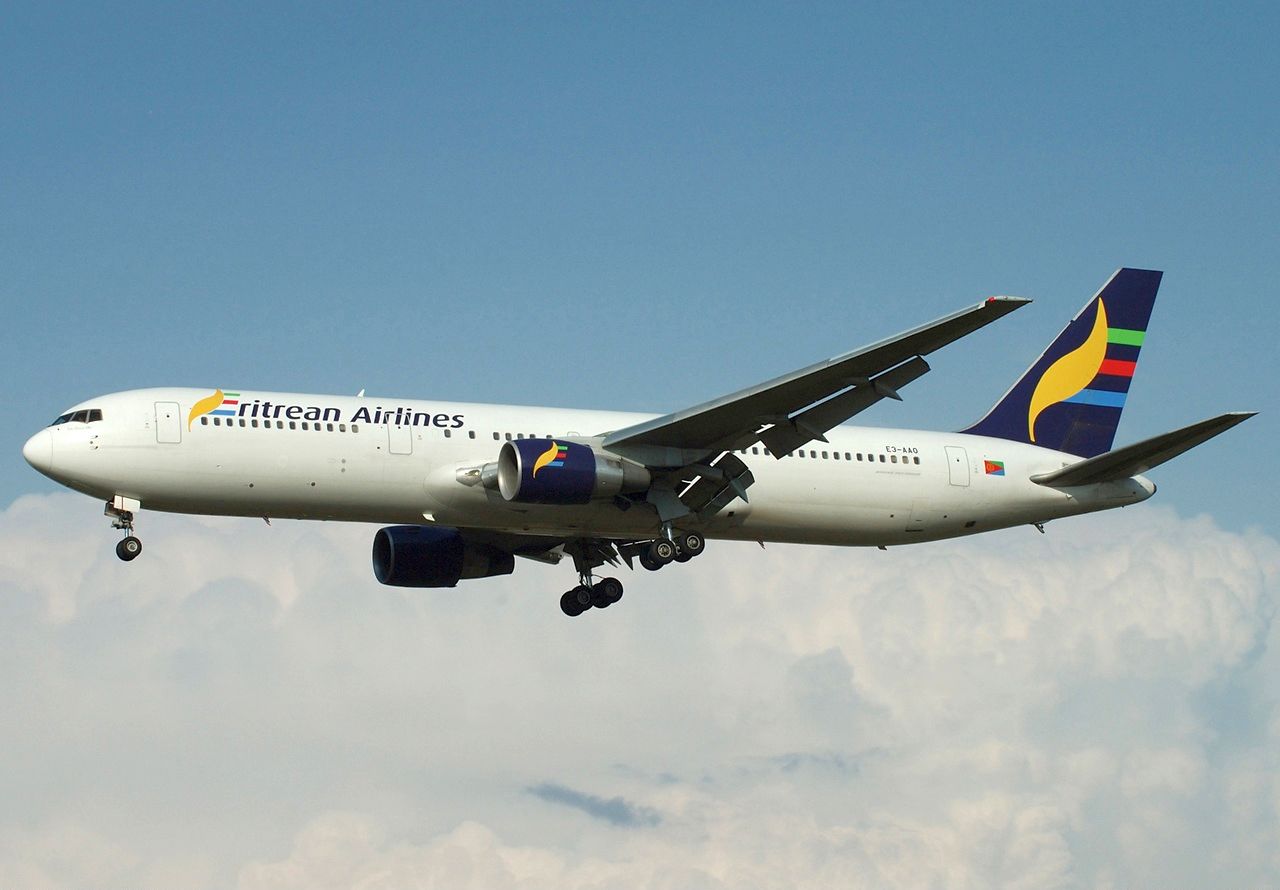
An Eritrean Airlines Boeing 767-366/ER aircraft. The national carrier is based in Asmara.

Transport in Eritrea includes highways, airports and seaports, in addition to various forms of public and private vehicular, maritime and aerial transportation.

== Railways ==
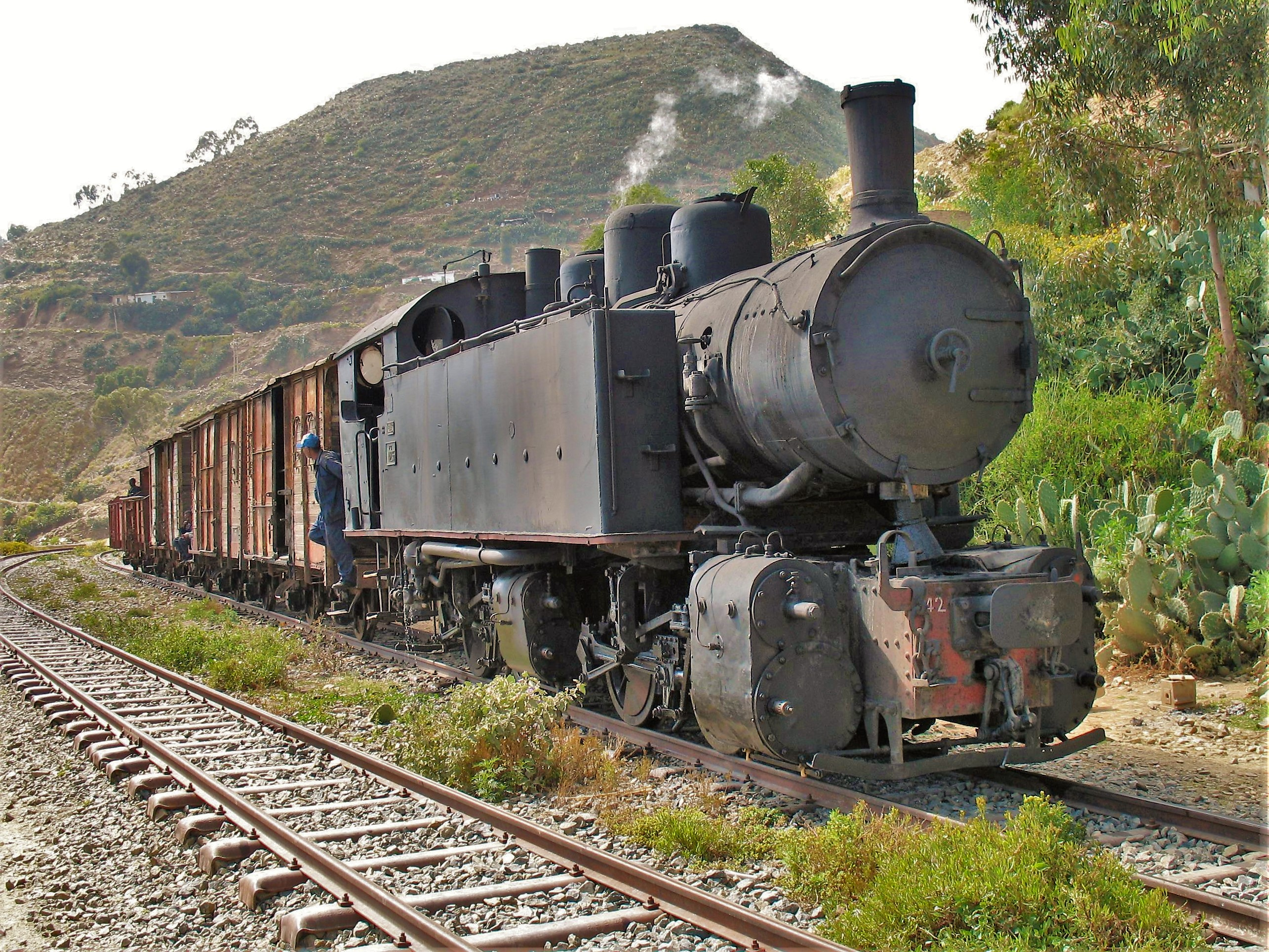
This steam locomotive dating from the 1930s still operates, carrying both freight and tourists.

As of 1999, there was a total of 317 kilometres of 950 mm (3 ft 1 3/8 in) (narrow gauge) rail line in Eritrea. The railway links Agordat and Asmara with the port of Massawa; however, it was nonoperational since 1978 except for about a 5 kilometre stretch that was reopened in Massawa in 1994. Rehabilitation of the remainder and of the rolling stock has occurred in recent years. By 2003, the line had been restored from Massawa all the way through to Asmara.

There are no rail links with adjacent countries.

== Highways ==
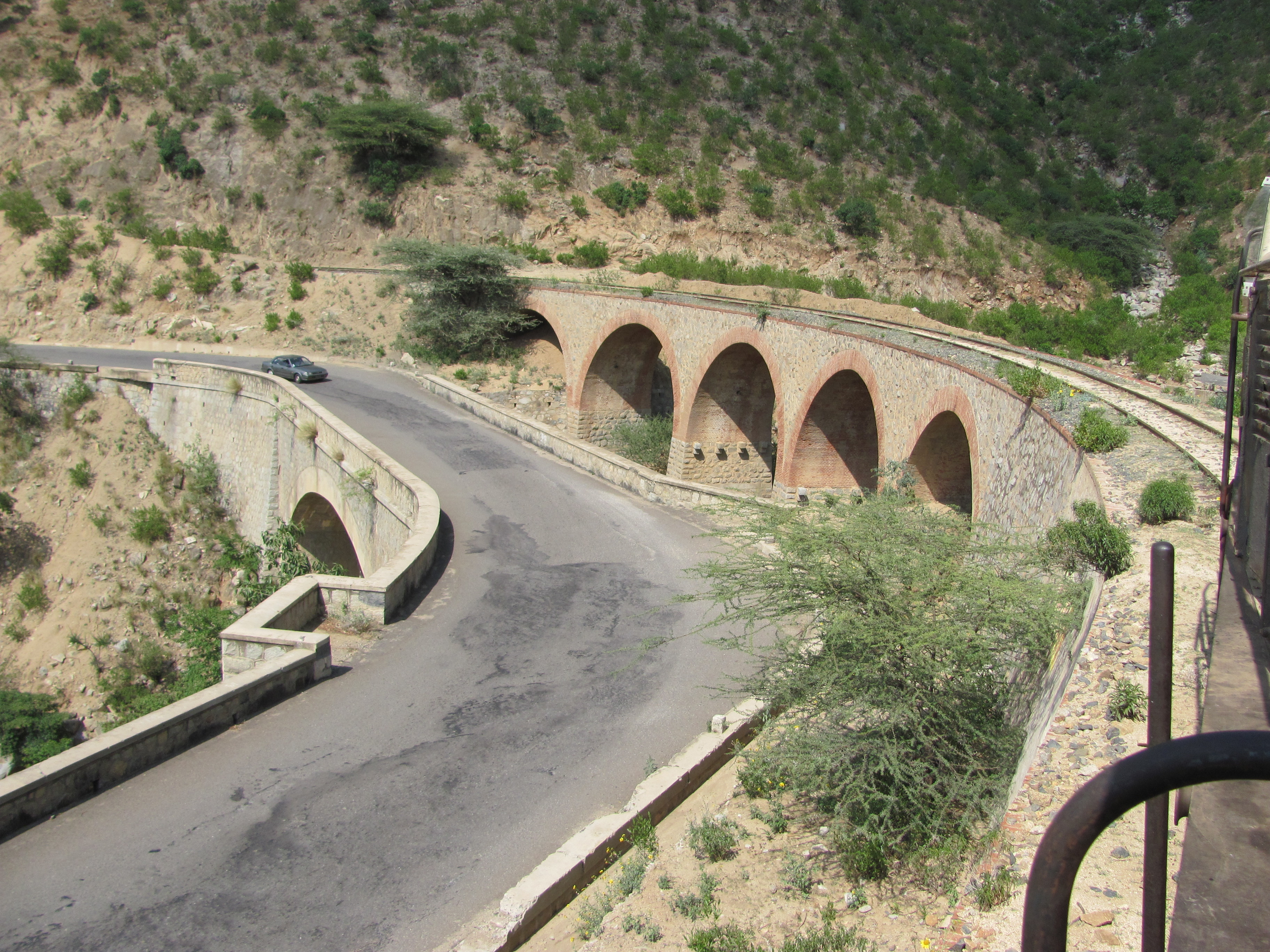
The Railway line Massawa-Asmara between Ghinda and Embatkalla.

The Eritrean highway system is named according to the road classification. The three levels of classification are: primary (P), secondary (S), and tertiary (T). The lowest level road is tertiary and serves local interests. Typically they are improved earth roads that are occasionally paved. During the wet seasons these roads typically become impassable. The next higher level road is a secondary road and typically is a single-layered asphalt road that connects district capitals together and those to the regional capitals. Roads that are considered primary roads are those that are fully covered with asphalt (throughout their entire length), and, in general, they carry traffic between all the major towns in Eritrea.

Primary Highways of Eritrea
Title	Start point	Intermediate point	End point	Road type
P-1	Asmara	Ghinda	Massawa	Asphalt
P-2	Asmara	Adi Tekelezan	Keren	Asphalt
P-3	Asmara	Adi Keyh	Senafe	Asphalt
P-4	Asmara	Mendefera	Mareb River (border with Ethiopia)	Asphalt
P-5	Keren	Barentu	Tesseney	Asphalt
P-6	Massawa	Tiyo	Asseb	Gravel
P-7	Asseb	n/a	Bure	Asphalt
P-8	Gahtelai	Shebah	She'eb	Asphalt
P-9	Serejeqa	n/a	Shebah	Gravel

total: 4,010 km
paved: 874 km
unpaved: 3,136 km (1996 est.)

== Seaports and harbours ==
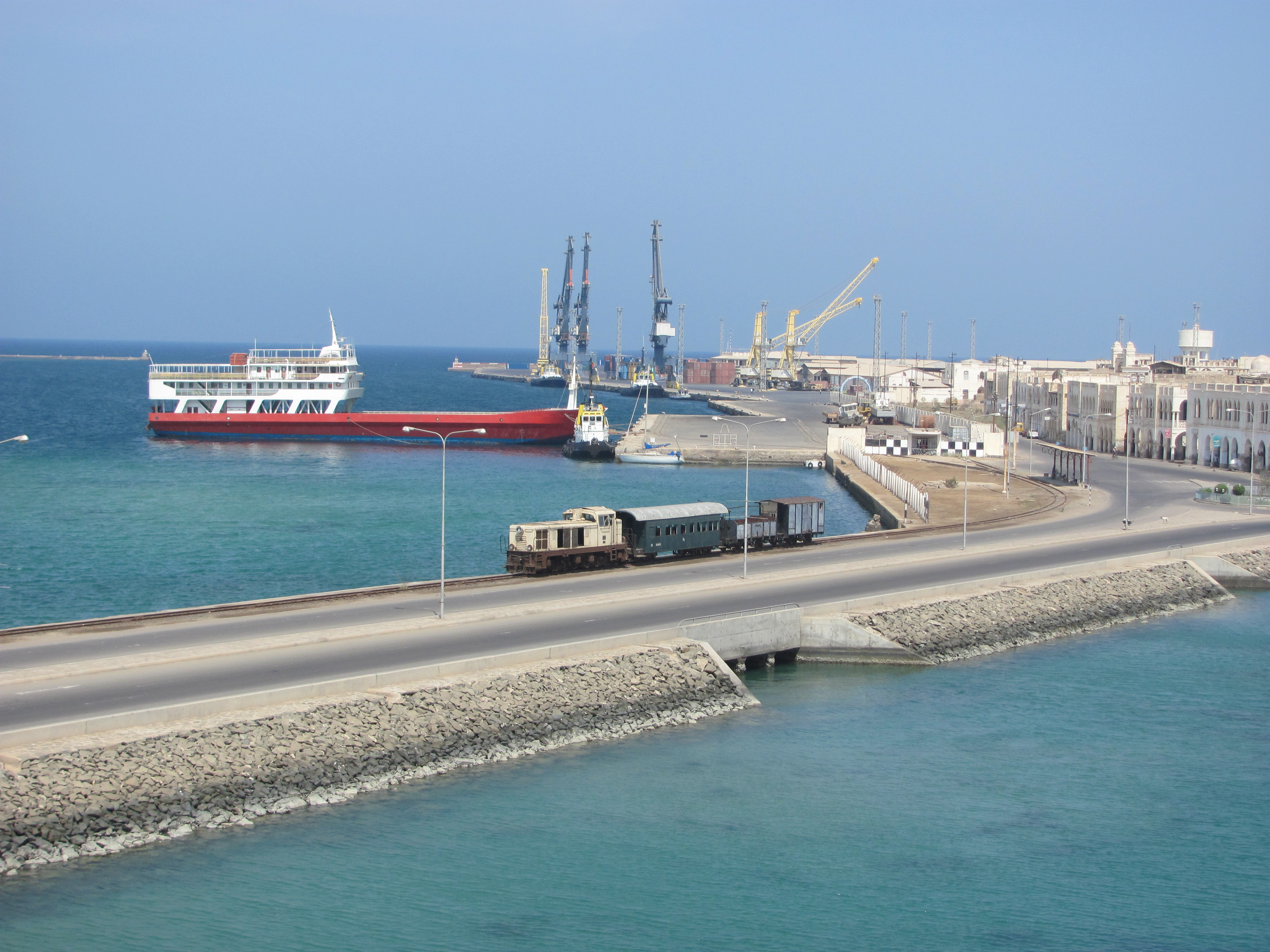
The Massawa harbor/port was created by the Italians.

=== Red Sea ===
- Asseb (Aseb)
- Massawa (Mits'iwa)

== Merchant marine ==
total: 5 ships (with a volume of 1,000 gross tonnage (GT) or over) totaling 16,069 GT/19,549 tonnes deadweight (DWT)
ships by type: bulk carrier 1, cargo ship 1, liquefied gas 1, petroleum tanker 1, roll-on/roll-off ship 1 (1999 est.)

== Airports ==
There are three international airports, one in the capital, Asmara International Airport, and the two others in the coastal cities, Massawa (Massawa International Airport) and Assab (Assab International Airport). The airport in Asmara received all international flights into the country as of March 2007, as well as being the main airport for domestic flights.

=== Airports - with paved runways ===
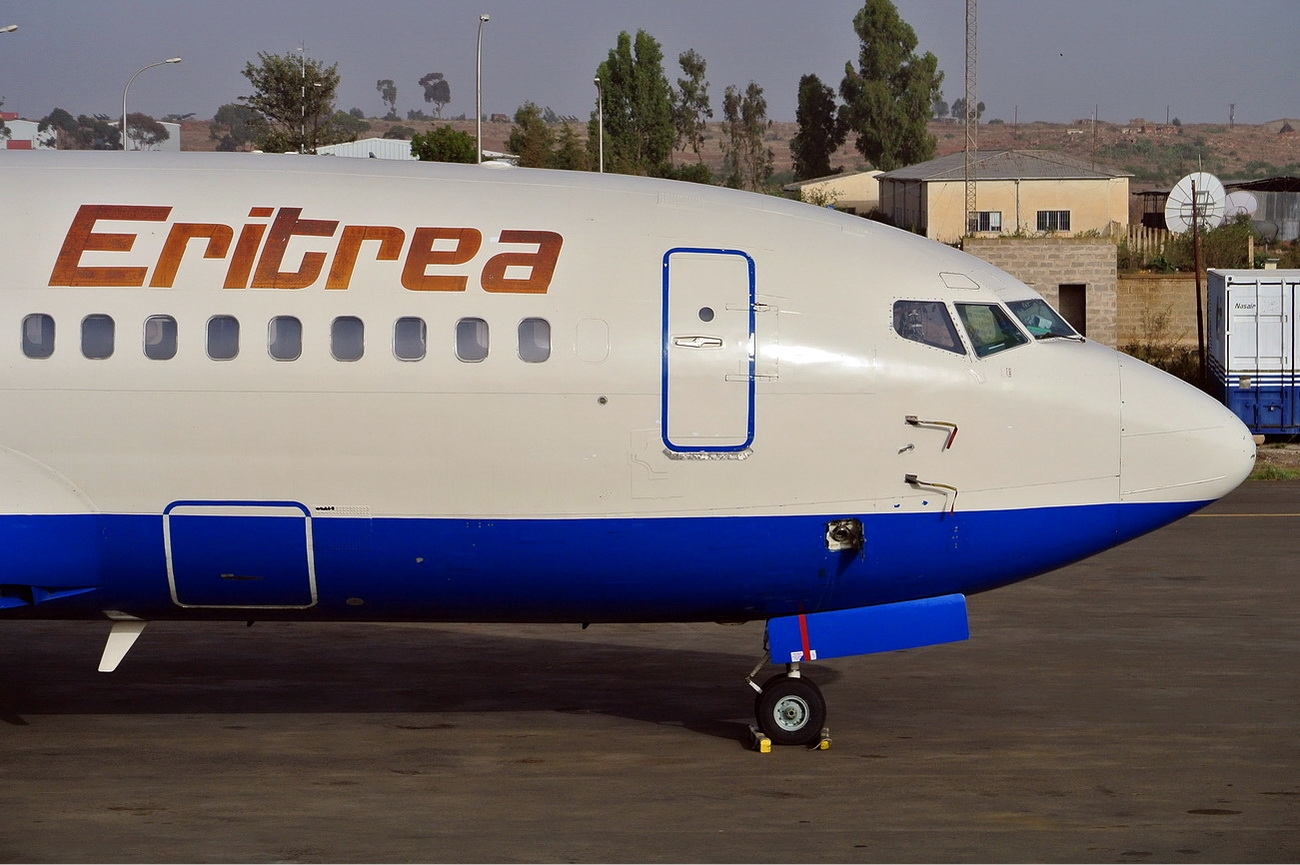
A Nasair Eritrea Boeing 737-200 aircraft at the Asmara International Airport.

Name	Length of the runway
Asmara	3,000 metres (9,800 ft)
Massawa	3,500 metres (11,500 ft)
Assab	3,515 metres (11,532 ft)

=== Airports - with unpaved runways ===
total: 18
over 3,047 m: 2
2,438 to 3,047 m: 2
1,524 to 2,437 m: 6
914 to 1,523 m: 6
under 914 m: 2 (1999 est.)

== Cableway ==
The Asmara-Massawa Cableway, built by Italy in the 1930s, connected the port of Massawa with the city of Asmara. The British later dismantled it during their eleven-year occupation after defeating Italy in World War II.

== See also ==
- Eritrea
