= List of airports in Eritrea =

This is a list of airports in Eritrea, sorted by location.

== List ==
Location	ICAO	IATA	Airport name
Agordat	HHAG		Agordat Airport
Asmara	HHAS	ASM	Asmara International Airport
Assab	HHSB	ASA	Assab International Airport
Massawa	HHMS	MSW	Massawa International Airport
Teseney	HHTS	TES	Teseney Airport
Nakfa, Eritrea	HHNF		Nakfa Airport

== See also ==
- Transport in Eritrea
- List of airports by ICAO code: H#HH - Eritrea
- Wikipedia: WikiProject Aviation/Airline destination lists: Africa#Eritrea
