= Operation Aider =

- Part of Ethiopian-Eritrean War
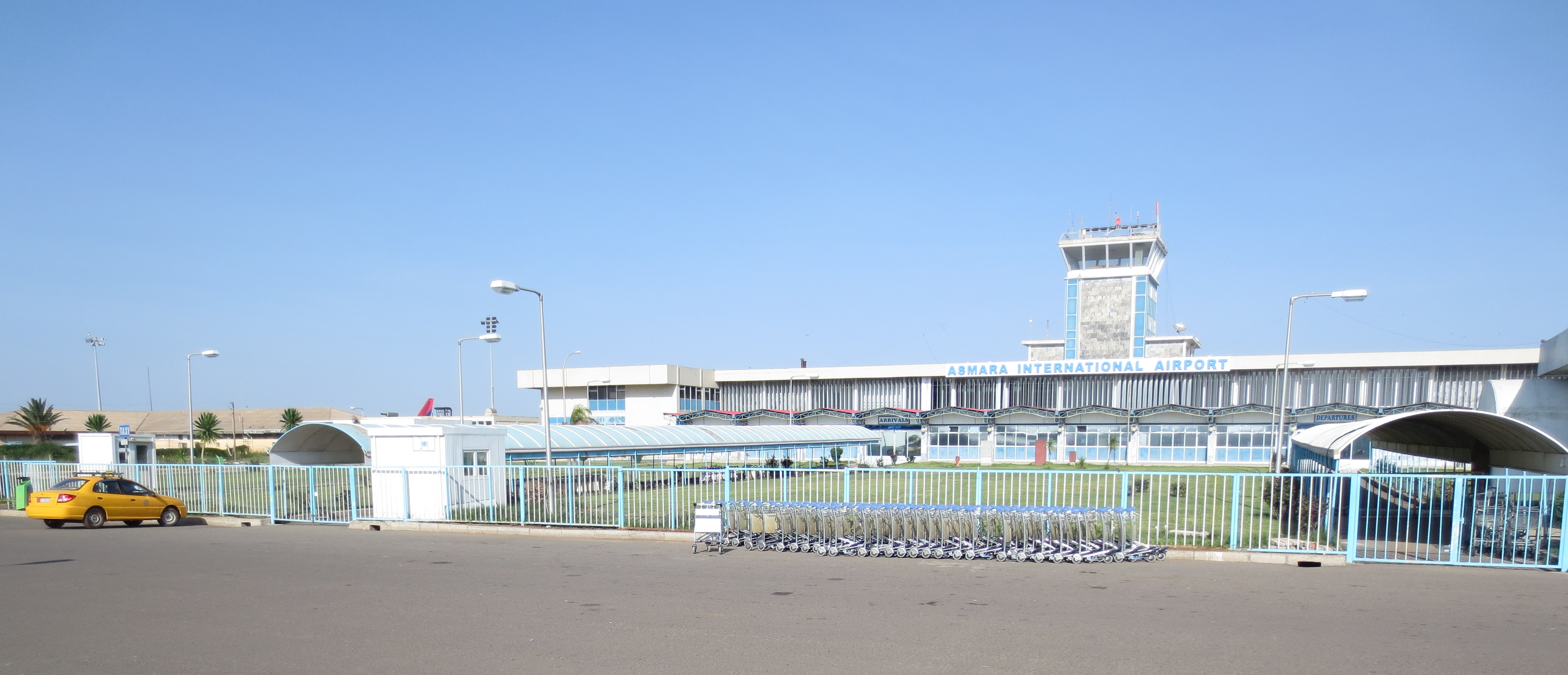
- Location: Asmara, Eritrea
- Date: 29 May 2000
- Target: Asmara International Airport
- Attack type: Airstrike
- Weapon: 4 MiG-23s
- Perpetrator: Ethiopian Air Force

Operation Aider is the codename of the Ethiopian Air Force's air attack on Asmara International Airport on 29 May 2000, during the Ethiopian-Eritrean War. The facility was used both as a military and as a civilian airport.

== Background ==
On 5 June 5 1998, an Eritrean MB-339 aircraft attacked the Ethiopian city of Mekele. Administrative buildings, an airfield and the Aider elementary School were subjected to airstrikes. 53 civilians were killed in the educational institution.

On 12 May 2000, the Ethiopian Armed Forces launched a major offensive operation. During the fighting, the Eritreans suffered a serious defeat. They agreed to sit down at the negotiating table. The parties agreed to meet on May 29 in Algiers.

== Airstrike ==
On 29 May 2000, the day of the start of the peace talks in Algeria, the Ethiopian Air Force struck the Eritrean cities of Asmera, Massawa and Mendefera. Obviously, the Ethiopians wanted to strengthen the position of their delegation.

Around noon that day, four Ethiopian MiG-23s attacked Asmara airport. With the first rocket salvo, they hit the control tower, which later completely burned down. Then the planes attacked the parking lots of military aircraft and helicopters and other objects. The aviation fuel warehouse was completely burned down, the runway and the power supply system were damaged. Aircraft (MiG-29 and Mi-35) managed to survive thanks to concrete bunkers.

Following the attackers, the Eritreans launched one or two MiG-29s, but failed to catch up with the enemy.

== Reaction ==
According to the Chief of the General Staff of the Ethiopian Armed Forces, Lieutenant General Tsadkan Gebretensae, the strike was aimed at taking the Eritrean Air Force out of the game. The acting official representative of the US State Department, Philip Riker, called on Ethiopians to refrain from airstrikes on the airport, since humanitarian aid is coming to Eritrea through it.

== Literature ==
- Михаил Жирохов. Война в воздухе на Африканском Роге // Уголок неба : авиационная энциклопедия. — 2004.
