= Eritrean Airlines =

Flag carrier of Eritrea

| IATA | ICAO | Call sign |
|---|---|---|
| B8 | ERT | ERITREAN |
- Founded: May 1991; 35 years ago
- Commenced operations: April 2003; 23 years ago
- Ceased operations: September 2024 (suspended)
- Hubs: Asmara International Airport
- Fleet size: 0
- Destinations: None
- Parent company: Government of Eritrea (100%)
- Headquarters: Asmara, Eritrea
- Employees: 0

Eritrean Airlines is the national airline of Eritrea. Based at Asmara International Airport, it is wholly owned by the government of Eritrea. Eritrean Airlines has been banned from flying into the European Union (EU) since December 2012. As of July 2023, Eritrean Airlines had no scheduled service. As of September 2024, it is operationally defunct.

== History ==
The airline was nominally established in May 1991, serving as the ground handling agent at Asmara International Airport and at Assab and Massawa. It also acted as sales agent for other major airlines flying to Eritrea. In May 2002, it was decided to expand into airline services. In April 2003, an ex-EgyptAir 14-year-old Boeing 767-300ER was leased from Boeing and used to start operations between Asmara and Amsterdam. It was the first aircraft the airline took possession of, and was named Queen Bee. The lease of the first Boeing 767 seems to have been replaced by an Airbus A320 in 2006 and then replaced again with a Boeing 757 in early 2007. It was again replaced with a DC-9 in late 2007, ending up with an MD-83.

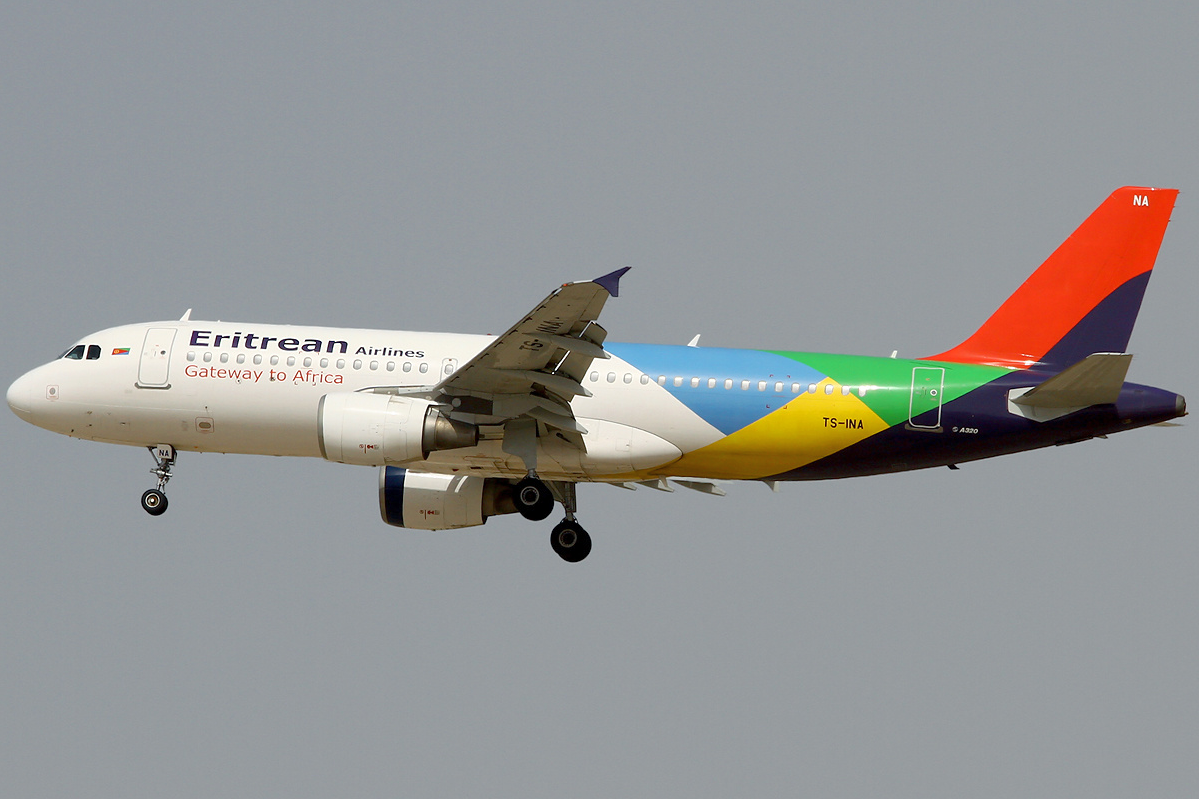
A Tunisia-registered Airbus A320-200 in Eritrean Airlines' new livery on short final to Dubai International Airport in 2012

In April 2003, Eritrean Airlines started regular services between Asmara and Frankfurt, Milan, Nairobi and Rome. In 2004, the airline added Amsterdam as another destination and in 2005, services began to Djibouti and Dubai. Meanwhile, the Nairobi route was dropped. By 2006, the flights to Amsterdam had been dropped while flights to Milan remained seasonal. On 21 September 2006, Eritrean Airlines entered an accord with the Government of Pakistan to start direct flights between Eritrea and Pakistan. Eritrean Airlines received permission from the Civil Aviation Authority of Pakistan to start two flights a week each for Karachi and Lahore. Eventually service was operated via Dubai four times per week on each route, with full fifth freedom passenger and cargo traffic rights on the Dubai - Pakistan sectors.

The airline announced in 2008 that it was commencing seasonal services to Bamako, for Hajj travellers. Flights to Djibouti were discontinued at the end of 2008 due to renewed tensions along the two countries' border, and flights to Frankfurt were cancelled in the summer of 2009. In 2011, Nasair, a privately owned company, merged with government-owned Eritrean Airlines, to form Nasair Eritrea.

In June 2011, a senior Eritrean Foreign Ministry official said that the United States government had applied pressure prohibiting companies from leasing aircraft to Eritrea. He stated that Washington was resorting to such illegal acts as part of its hostile attempts of stiffening anti-Eritrea sanctions, at a time when the Eritrean government was engaged in buying and leasing of passenger planes under new Pakistani management.

Eritrean Airlines resumed operations on 16 July 2011. It also introduced a new livery on the first A320 received, which was used for the inaugural service to Dubai and Lahore. A second A320 was added in October, and flights to Karachi were launched. The carrier also planned to restore domestic services once the currently stored Dornier fleet was made airworthy. Long-term fleet plans included introduction of wide body aircraft like the Airbus A330, as well as new Boeing 737s to replace the A320.

=== EU ban ===
Since December 2012, Eritrean Airlines has been included in the European Commission list of airlines barred from flying into the EU.

=== Proposed Ethiopian Airlines deal ===
In July 2018, Ethiopian Airlines was in talks for a 20% stake in Eritrean Airlines. As of January 2025, it is unclear if the deal was ever finalized.

== Destinations ==
As of January 2020, Eritrean had scheduled service to four destinations: Cairo, Addis Ababa, Khartoum, and Jeddah. As of April 2025, no flights are scheduled on those routes.

| Country | City | Airport | Notes | Refs |
|---|---|---|---|---|
| Egypt | Cairo | Cairo International Airport | No scheduled service | |
| Ethiopia | Addis Ababa | Addis Ababa Bole International Airport | Terminated | |
| Eritrea | Asmara | Asmara International Airport | Hub | |
| Germany | Frankfurt | Frankfurt Airport | Terminated | |
| Italy | Milan | Milan Malpensa Airport | No scheduled service | |
| Italy | Rome | Leonardo da Vinci–Fiumicino Airport | Terminated | |
| Nigeria | Kano | Mallam Aminu Kano International Airport | No scheduled service | |
| Pakistan | Karachi | Jinnah International Airport | Terminated | |
| Pakistan | Lahore | Allama Iqbal International Airport | Terminated | |
| Saudi Arabia | Jeddah | King Abdulaziz International Airport | Terminated | |
| South Africa | Cape Town | Cape Town International Airport | Terminated | |
| South Africa | Johannesburg | O. R. Tambo International Airport | Terminated | |
| Sudan | Khartoum | Khartoum International Airport | Terminated | |
| Sudan | Port Sudan | Port Sudan New International Airport | Terminated | |
| United Arab Emirates | Dubai | Dubai International Airport | No scheduled service | |

== Fleet ==
=== Current fleet ===
The Eritrean Airlines fleet in July 2020 consisted of a Boeing 737-300. Eritrean is also said to have six Dornier aircraft, which are stored in Eritrea.

=== Former fleet ===
Eritrean Airlines former fleet

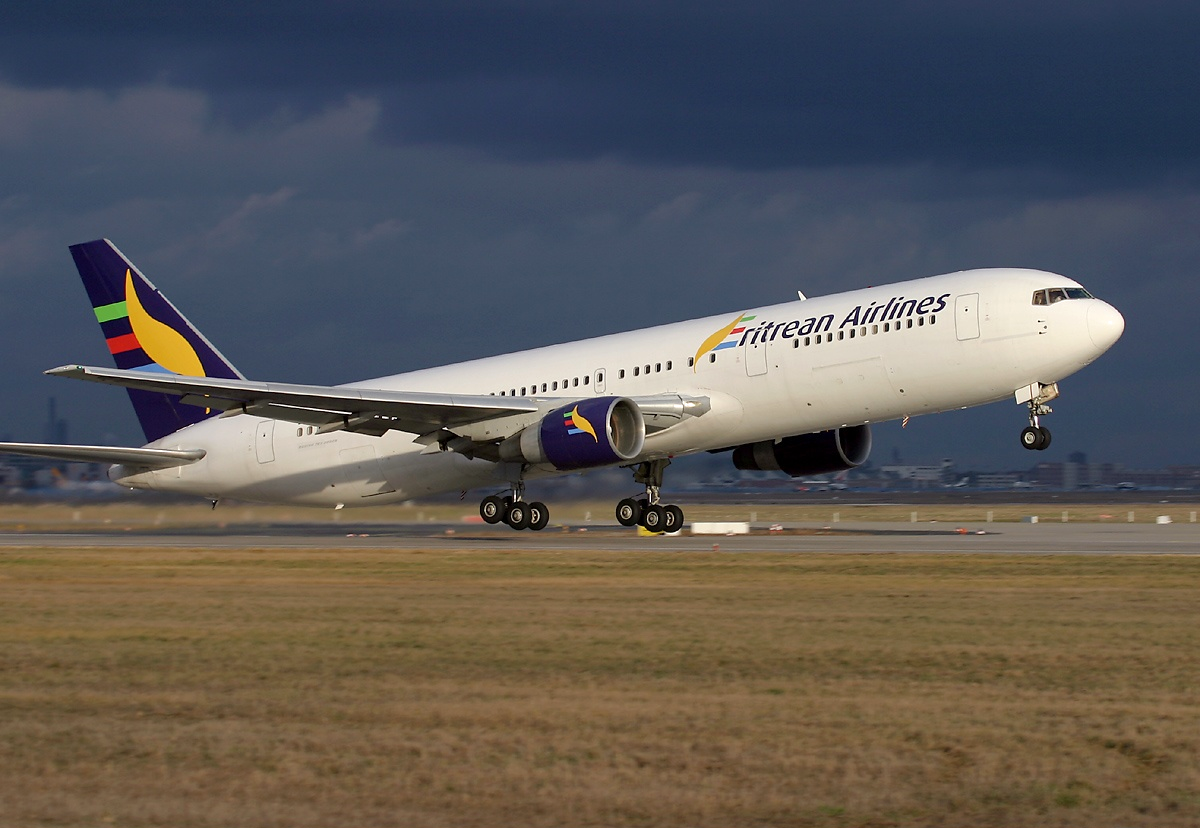
Queen Bee, Eritrean Airlines' first aircraft—a Boeing 767-300ER, is seen here at Frankfurt Airport in 2004.

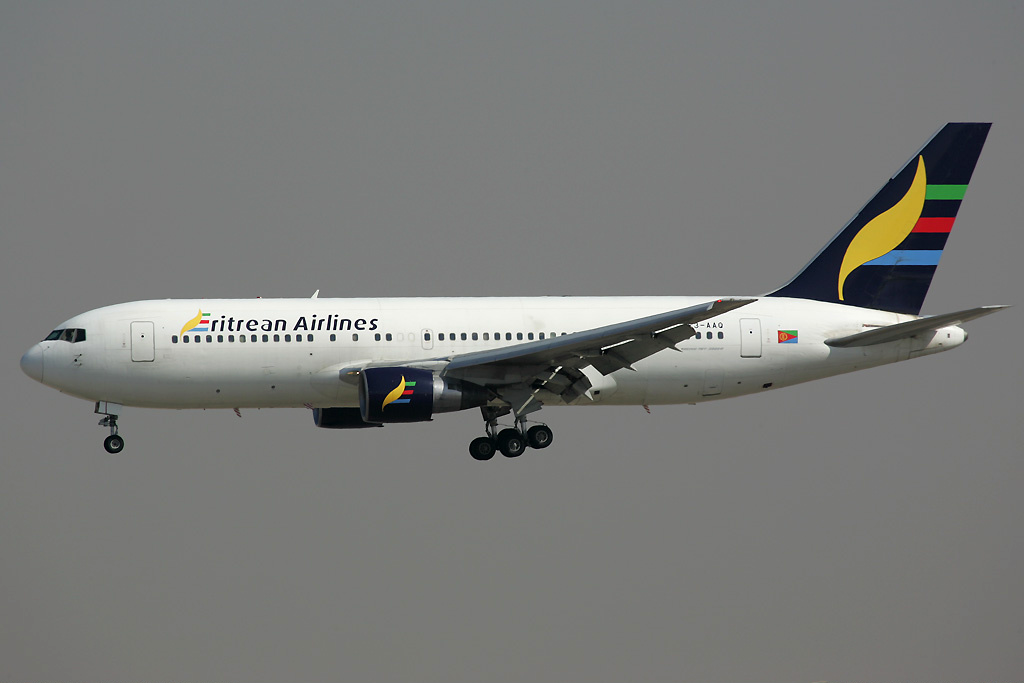
Eritrean Airlines Boeing 767-200ER on short final to Dubai International Airport in 2005

The airline previously operated the following equipment:

- Airbus A319-100
- Airbus A320-200
- Boeing 737-300
- Boeing 757-200
- Boeing 767-200ER
- Boeing 767-300ER
- McDonnell Douglas MD-80

== See also ==
- List of air carriers banned in the European Union
- Transport in Eritrea
