= Nas Air =

Nas Air may refer to:

- flynas, formerly Nas Air, Saudi Arabia
- Nasair, Nasair Eritrea
