= Wadi Halfa Airport =

Airport in Sudan

- IATA: WHF; ICAO: HSSW

Summary
- Airport type: Public
- Serves: Wadi Halfa
- Elevation AMSL: 933 ft (284 m)
- Coordinates: 21°48′00″N 31°31′00″E

Map
- Location of the airport in Sudan

Runways
Direction	Length		Surface
Direction	m	ft	Surface
06/24	2,000	6,562	Gravel
01/19	318	1,043	Gravel
- Source: Google Maps GCM

Wadi Halfa Airport (IATA: WHF, ICAO: HSSW) is an airport serving Wadi Halfa in Sudan. The airport is approximately 14 kilometres (8.7 mi) east of Wadi Halfa.

== History ==
In 1925 Alan Cobham made a first survey flight for Imperial Airways (a forerunner of British Airways) from UK to Cape Town, South Africa, stopping at Wadi Halfa on the way.

In 1943 BOAC (a forerunner of British Airways) started a weekly flight between Cairo, Wadi Halfa and Khartoum with Lockheed 18 Lodestars.

In 1952, Airwork and Hunting-Clan (the forerunners of British Caledonian Airways ) started operating a regular air service called Safari between London, UK and Entebbe, Uganda stopping at Wadi Halfa airport en route. They were still running the service in 1959.

In 1956, Ethiopian Airlines were operating a service between Addis Ababa and Athens, Greece with a fuel stop at Wadi Halfa Airport.

In 2012, the Sudanese government was reported to be planning to build a new airport at Wadi Halfa.

== Accidents and incidents ==
- 1937: A Savoia-Marchetti S.73 flown by Ala Littoria was flying from Asmara, Eritrea to Wadi Halfa and crashed while approaching the runway at 5:30 a.m. killing all three crew and six passengers. That same year, Imperial Airways commenced a flying boat service between Southampton, UK and Durban, South Africa stopping at Wadi Halfa on the way.
- 1962: A Vickers 739 Viscount operated by United Arab Airlines flying from Jerusalem to Cairo, Egypt was diverted to Wadi Halfa airport because of bad weather at Cairo. The plane ran out of fuel and crashed 5 kilometres (3 miles) West of Wadi Halfa airport but the 16 passengers and crew survived.

== See also ==
- Transport in Sudan
- List of airports in Sudan
