= HHMS =

HHMS may refer to:

- Massawa International Airport, in Eritrea
- His Hawaiian Majesty's Ship, a ship designation; see Kaimiloa, the only ship ever so designated
- His Hellenic Majesty's Ship, a ship designation; see Hellenic Navy
