= Teseney Airport =

- IATA: TES; ICAO: HHTS

Summary
- Airport type: Public
- Serves: Teseney
- Elevation AMSL: 2,018 ft (615 m)
- Coordinates: 15°06′10″N 36°41′00″E

Map
- Location of the airport in Eritrea

Runways
Direction	Length		Surface
Direction	ft	m	Surface
14/32	7,645	2,330	Asphalt
- Source: Google Maps

Teseney Airport (IATA: TES, ICAO: HHTS) is an airport serving Teseney, Eritrea. It has an asphalt runway of 2,330 meters.

== See also ==
- Transport in Eritrea
