= Habtezion Hadgu =

Eritrean general involved with the air force

- Born: Eritrea
- Military career
- Allegiance: (People's Democratic Republic of Ethiopia) Ethiopia (until 1988); Eritrea (1994–2002)
- Branch: Ethiopian Air Force (until 1988); Eritrean Air Force
- Rank: Brigadier General
- Conflicts: Ethiopian Civil War; Eritrean War of Independence; Eritrean-Ethiopian War

Habtezion Hadgu is an Eritrean fighter pilot and former air force officer who is credited as the founder and first commander of the Eritrean Air Force.

== Career ==
Hadgu was an Ethiopian Air force pilot during the Derg regime, and later defected in 1988 to the Eritrean People's Liberation Front (EPLF) during the Eritrean War of Independence. He was specifically a MiG-23 pilot. When the Eritrean Air Force was established in 1994, Commander Hadgu called many Eritrean officers who formerly served in the Ethiopian Air Force to serve in Eritrea's nascent air force.

During the Eritrean–Ethiopian War, Hadgu was directly responsible for the air power response of the Eritrean Defence Forces to the Ethiopian military.

== Arrest ==
Hadgu was arrested in late January 2003, shortly after an Ethiopian fighter plane landed in Asmara and Air Force officials attempted to contact Hadgu at his home. Within minutes of the landing of the plane, President Isaias Afwerki ordered the arrest of Hadgu. He was replaced, first by his deputy, Colonel Abraham Ogbaselasse, and then by Major General Teklai Habteslassie. On 23 July 2003, Hadgu, was arrested again, with the government giving no reasons for his arrest. Hadgu has been held incommunicado in prison for over 20 years, and his fate is unknown, as he was never again mentioned in public.

== Personal life ==
He was married and has a daughter, Semhar Habtezion, who has in recent years advocated for more information on his fate.
