= Shebah =

Shebah (Arabic: شيباه) is an agricultural settlement on the plains beneath and east of the eastern escarpment of the Eritrean highlands which forms part of the Northern Red Sea administrative region with its capital in Massawa. It is situated about halfway on the She'eb-Gahtelai road and is also the end-point of a gravel road which traverses the eastern escarpment and has its other end-point at the highland town of Serejeqa on the Asmara-Keren asphalt road. Shebah like She'eb was the site of a massacre at the hands of Ethiopian occupational troops in 1988, but has since largely recovered, with its exiled population returning and engaging in agriculture.
