= Wad Medani Airport =

Airport in Sudan

Wad Madani Airport
- IATA: DNI; ICAO: HSWD

Summary
- Airport type: Closed
- Serves: Wad Madani, Sudan
- Elevation AMSL: 1,344 ft / 410 m
- Coordinates: 15.3875°N 36.3289°E

Map
- Location in Sudan

Runways
Direction	Length		Surface
Direction	ft	m	Surface
Closed
- Source: Google Maps Landings GCM

Wad Madani Airport was an airport formerly serving Wad Madani, a city in Sudan.

Google Maps shows the runway area is built over.

== See also ==
- Transport in Sudan
- List of airports in Sudan
