= Sennar Airport =

- IATA: none; ICAO: HSNR

Summary
- Serves: Sennar
- Location: Sudan
- Coordinates: 13.55°N 33.617°E
- Interactive map of Sennar Airport

Sennar Airport is an airport serving Sennar in Sudan.

Sennar Airport is the main airport of Sennar, Sudan.
