= Serejeqa =

Town in Eritrea, South Africa

Serejeqa (Arabic: سيريجاكا, Tigrinya: ሰረጃቓ) is a town in the Anseba Region of Eritrea. It is located about 20 km northwest of Asmara on the asphalt road to Keren, which in turn lies roughly 75 km away. The town is situated on the ridge of the Eritrean Highlands. It is the upper endpoint of a gravel-road that traverses the eastern escarpments and has its other endpoint in Shebah, on the low-lying plains at the foot of escarpments. With this gravel road, Serejeqa connects the north-western part of the highlands, including the city of Keren (Eritrea's third largest city) with the Red Sea and the port of Massawa (the second largest city). This route can be traveled without having to pass through the congested capital and largest city Asmara or use the equally congested mountain-segment of the Asmara-Massawa asphalt road. Instead, the gravel road beginning in Serejeqa on one end, connects to the She'eb-Gahtelai asphalt road, which in turn unites with the less congested lowland part of the Massawa asphalt road, just 35 km from Massawa itself. Due to its proximity and connections to Asmara, Serejeqa also functions as a suburb of the capital, although it is not part of the metropolitan region of the capital (i.e. Maekel or Central Region).
