= She'eb massacre =

1988 mass killing during the Eritrean War of Independence

- Part of the Eritrean War of Independence
- Location: She'eb, Eritrea Province, Ethiopia
- Date: May 12, 1988
- Target: Eritreans
- Deaths: 200-500
- Perpetrator: Derg regime

The She'eb massacre was a massacre committed against the Eritrean civilian population in the town of She'eb during the Eritrean War of Independence by the Ethiopian military during the spring of 1988, towards the end of the Ethiopian Civil War.

== Massacre ==
The entire town was raised and burnt to the ground in 1988, and the people who had not been able to flee were ordered to assemble and subsequently run over with tanks while those trying to flee were shot. The massacre left about 400 people dead, including many elderly and children who had not been able to flee in advance. They proceeded to kill at least 100 more civilians in neighboring villages.

== See also ==
- List of massacres committed during the Eritrean War of Independence
