= Agordat Airport =

- IATA: none; ICAO: HHAG

Summary
- Airport type: Public
- Serves: Agordat
- Elevation AMSL: 2,054 ft / 626 m
- Coordinates: 15°32′10″N 37°51′45″E

Map
- Location of the airport in Eritrea

Runways
Direction	Length		Surface
Direction	ft	m	Surface
10/28	3,870	1,180	Dirt
- Source: Google Maps

Agordat Airport (IATA: HHAG) is an airstrip serving Agordat, Eritrea.

== See also ==
- Transport in Eritrea
