= Shendi Airport =

Airport in Sudan

Coordinates: 16.70000°N 33.43300°E

- IATA: none; ICAO: HSND

Summary
- Serves: Shendi
- Location: Sudan
- Interactive map of Shendi Airport

Runways
Direction	Length		Surface
Direction	ft	m	Surface
			dirt

Shendi Airport is an airport serving Shendi in Sudan. Its ICAO code is HSND.
