= Assab International Airport =

- IATA: ASA; ICAO: HHSB

Summary
- Airport type: Public/Military
- Serves: Assab
- Location: Eritrea
- Elevation AMSL: 46 ft (14 m)
- Coordinates: 13°04′18″N 42°38′42″E
- Website: atozairports.com

Map
- Location of airport in Eritrea

Runways
Direction	Length		Surface
Direction	ft	m	Surface
12/30	11,531	3,515	Asphalt

Assab International Airport (IATA: ASA, ICAO: HHSB) is an international airport in Assab, the capital of the Southern Red Sea region of Eritrea.

== Characteristics ==
It serves as a dual public and military facility. The airport has an 11,531 ft (3,515 m) asphalt runway. It currently receives no regular scheduled airline flights.

== History ==
The airport was created during the colonial era of Italian Eritrea in the late 1930s, as a secondary airport of military support in the region.

Damaged during World War II, for years it has been used only for private and military flights. In 2017 there it is a civilian weekly flight between Assab and Massawa International Airport. As of November 2018 Eritrean Airlines is planning to start routes to Asmara, and Addis Ababa.

Starting in September 2015, United Arab Emirates armed forces upgraded the airbase to host its military forces to support its intervention in Yemen, with a partial withdraw starting in 2021.
