= Aermacchi MB-339 =

Italian military aircraft

MB-339
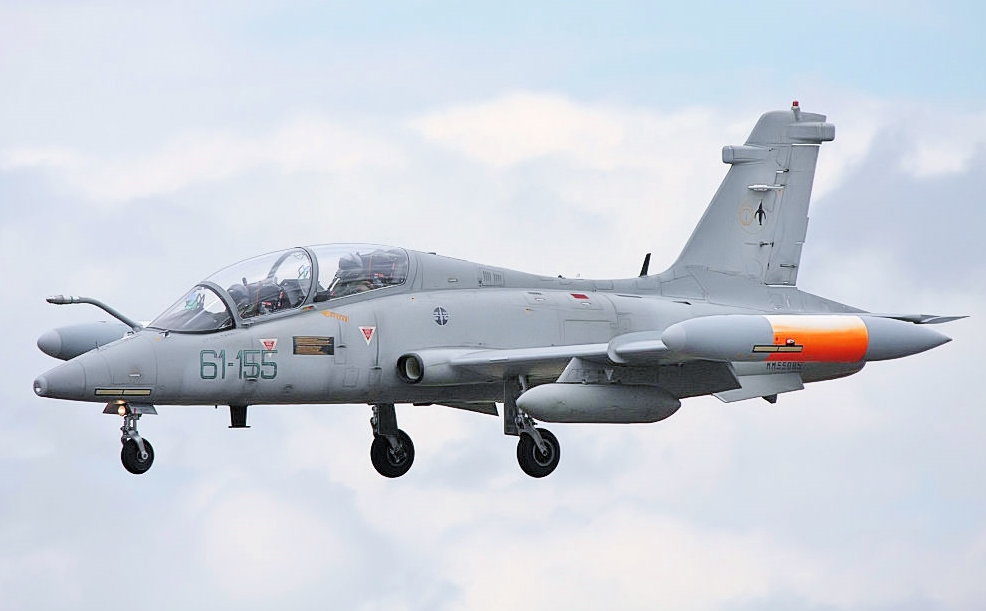
- An MB-339CD of the Italian Air Force

General information
- Type: Advanced trainer and light attack aircraft
- Manufacturer: Aermacchi
- Status: Active
- Primary users: Italian Air Force Eritrean Air Force; United Arab Emirates Air Force
- Number built: 230

History
- Manufactured: 1978–2006
- Introduction date: 1979
- First flight: 12 August 1976
- Developed from: Aermacchi MB-326

The Aermacchi MB-339 is a military jet trainer and light attack aircraft designed and manufactured by Italian aviation company Aermacchi.

The MB-339 was developed during the 1970s in response to an Italian Air Force requirement that sought a replacement for the service's existing fleet of Aermacchi MB-326s. Its design was derived from that of the MB-326, rather than a new design, and thus the two aircraft share considerable similarities in terms of their design. Aermacchi had found that the MB-339 was capable of satisfying all of the specified requirements while being the most affordable option available. The maiden flight of the MB-339 took place on 12 August 1976; the first production aircraft were delivered two years later.

Roughly half of all MB-339s entered service with the Italian Air Force, while the remainder have been sold to various export customers. As well as being used for training, the type is also flown by the Frecce Tricolori aerobatic display team. The type has been used in combat by both the Eritrean Air Force during the Eritrean–Ethiopian War of 1998–2000 and the Argentine Naval Aviation during the Falklands War of 1982. In both conflicts, the MB-339 was typically flown as an attack aircraft. In Italian service, the aircraft is intended to be replaced by the newer Aermacchi M-345.

== Development ==
During September 1972, Aermacchi was awarded a contract to study a replacement for the Italian Air Force's aging MB-326 fleet, a type which had effectively been the standard advanced jet trainer of the 1960s. During this study, designers at the company compared seven all-new designs (which were collectively referred to by the designation of MB-338) against an improved version of the MB-326, which was designated MB-339. It was determined that the envisioned MB-339 would be capable to satisfying the established requirements of the Italian Air Force, while also being cheaper than producing any of the rival clean-sheet designs. Accordingly, Aermacchi submitted the MB-339 for official evaluation; during 1975, it was selected to replace both the MB-326 and the Fiat G.91T fleets that were then in Italian service.

On 12 August 1976, the maiden flight of the prototype, designated MB-339X, took place. During July 1978, the first production-standard aircraft made its first flight; during the following year, deliveries of the MB-339A to the Italian Air Force commenced. The service would be the primary operator of the type; reportedly, between 1978 and 1987, 101 MB-339As would be delivered to the Italian Air Force, which is almost half of the total examples of the type to have been constructed to date.

Various improved models would be developed by Aermacchi. During 1980, a dedicated single-seat attack variant, referred to as the MB-339K Veltro II, performed its maiden flight. During 1985, the MB-339B, which incorporated a light-attack capability, entered operational service. That same year, the first MB-339C, which featured various refinements and was intended as a dual-use aircraft, made its first flight. During the late 1980s, the enhanced MB-339C was made available to customers; this model principally differed from preceding variants via the implementation of a much-modernised cockpit. Early on, the Italian government chose to procure the MB-339CD; in addition to the fully digital cockpit, this variant was furnished with a fixed probe for aerial refueling, enabling its use for refueling training.

During 1989, Aermacchi formed a partnership with American defense conglomerate Lockheed and the aircraft division of General Motors to jointly bid in the American Joint Primary Aircraft Training System (JPATS) programme. The Italian-American team proposed a modified model of the MB-339, referred to as the T-Bird II, to contend for the competition. If successful, Lockheed would have acted as the prime contractor and system integrator, assembling the T-Bird II at its Marietta facility, while General Motors was to provide its computerised training experience. However, the bid was ultimately not successful; instead, a rival turboprop-powered submission by Raytheon and Pilatus was awarded the contract to produce the T-6 Texan II for this requirement.

Throughout the 1990s and into the 2000s, multiple tranches of the MB-339CD variant would be inducted into Italian service. Furthermore, various operators chose to have their existing aircraft remanufactured to the more advanced MB-339C standard. During the 2000s, the MB-339FD (FD standing for Full Digital), was proposed but ultimately attracted little market interest. During 2006, it was announced that the MB-339 assembly line, which had been shuttered for several years, would be revived in response to interest in further orders of the type being expressed by three separate customers.

During the 1990s and 2000s, as a result of corporate mergers and restructuring, the MB-339 became only one of several training aircraft being offered by Aermacchi, other aircraft being propeller-driven SF-260, the basic S.211, M-311, and the M-346. According to company Giorgio Brazzelli, its various training platforms come together to form part of an integrated training system to its customers.

== Design ==
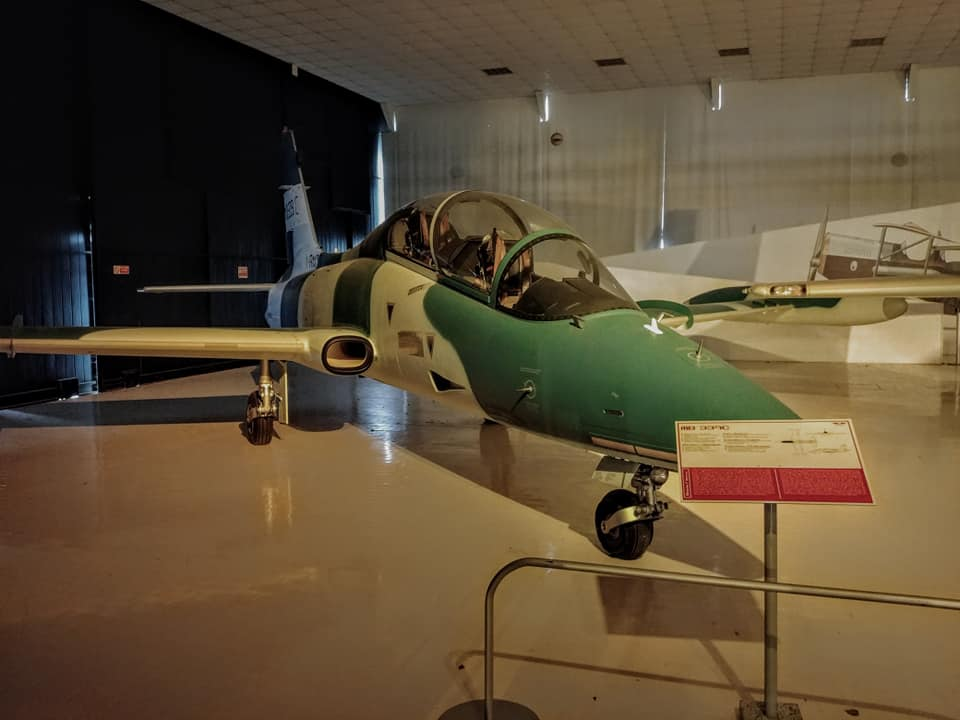
MB-339 at the Volandia Museum of Milan Malpensa Airport

The Aermacchi MB-339 is a military jet trainer and light attack aircraft, featuring a conventional configuration, tricycle undercarriage and all-metal construction. It has many similarities with the design of the MB-326, sharing the majority of its airframe with the older aircraft. According to aviation periodical Air International, the most significant revision of the MB-339 was a redesigned forward fuselage, which raised the instructor's seat to allow visibility over and past the student pilot's head. In typical operations, the aircraft is flown by a crew of two, who are seated in a tandem configuration; during training missions, the student is seated in the forward position while the observing instructor is placed directly behind and somewhat above them. The cockpit is pressurised and is covered by a jettisonable canopy which works in conjunction with the twin Martin-Baker-built ejection seats.

The MB-339 possesses a low, un-swept wing complete with tip tanks; the air intakes for the single turbojet engine is located within the wing roots. This wing is identical to that used on the older MB-326K model. The powerplant used for the aircraft's initial versions was the Rolls-Royce Viper 632-43 turbojet engine, which was capable of producing a maximum thrust of 4,000 lbf (17.8 kN); this is the same model as installed upon the older MB-326K model. Later models, such as the MB-339C, are furnished with the more powerful Viper 680 engine, which can generate up to 4,300 lbf (19.57 kN) of thrust. For improved aerodynamics, the MB-339 features an enlarged tailfin over its predecessor.

While some models of the MB-339 are primarily intended for training operations, other are instead principally equipped to perform light fighter and fighter-bomber roles. Combat-orientated aircraft are typically outfitted with more advanced avionics, such as improved inertial guidance systems, digital nav/attack computers, a MIL-STD-1553B databus, and hands-on throttle-and-stick (HOTAS)-compatible flight controls. Furthermore, various defensive systems, such as a radio jammer, radar warning receiver (RWR), electronic countermeasures (ECM), along with larger wingtip tanks, would typically be adopted. The MB-339K carries a pair of 30mm DEFA cannon while a total of six underwing hard points can accommodate up to 1,815 kilograms (4,000 lb) of external stores. It has been qualified to be armed with various munitions, such as the Sidewinder and R.550 Magic air-to-air missiles, the AGM-65 Maverick air-to-surface missile, various laser-guided bombs and rockets, as well as the Marte Mk.2 anti-ship missile. According to Forecast International, Aermacchi had at one point considered making provisions for the installation of an additional two pod-mounted 30mm cannon.

== Operational history ==
=== General use ===
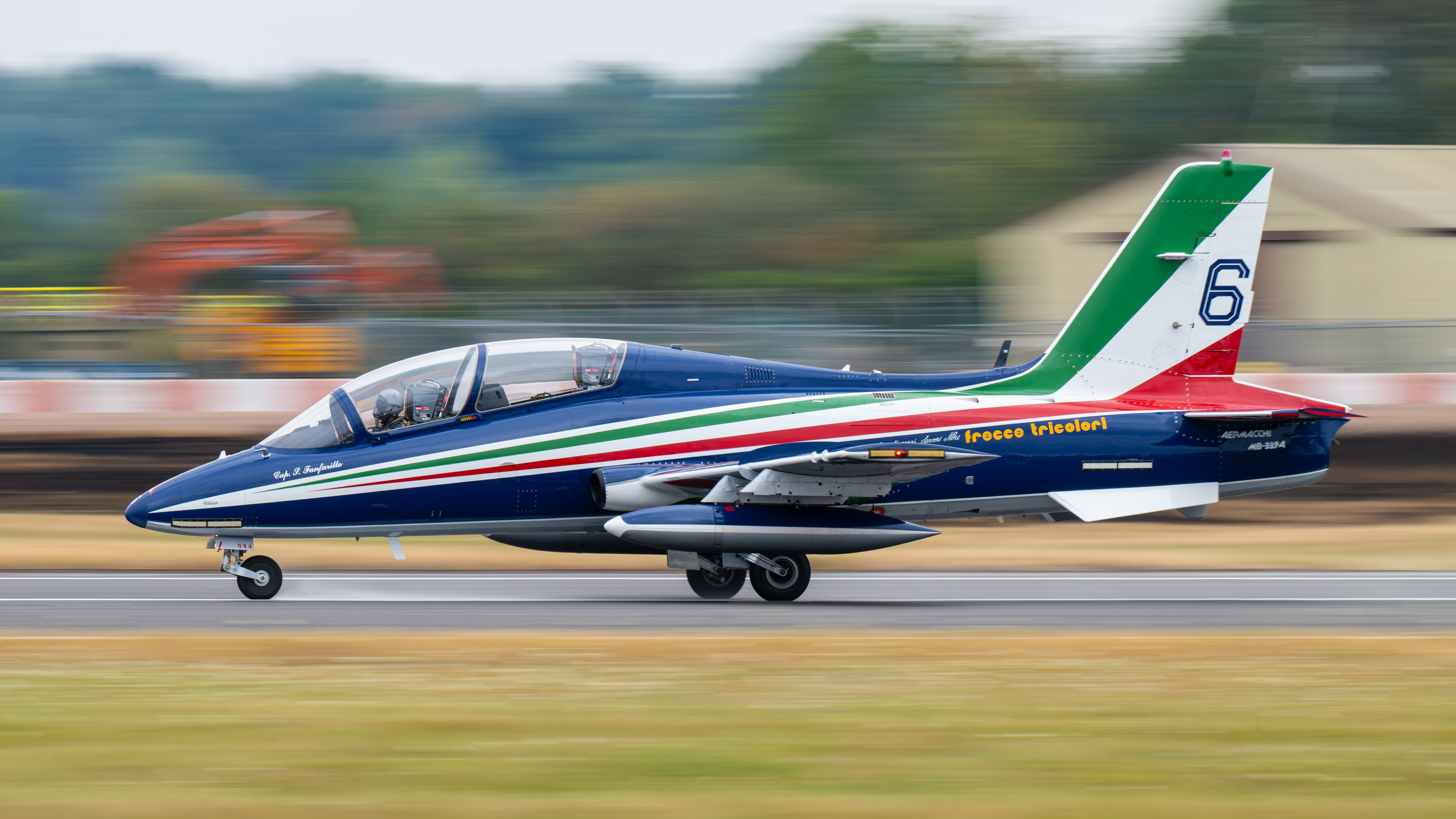
MB-339PAN at the Frecce Tricolori aerobatic team

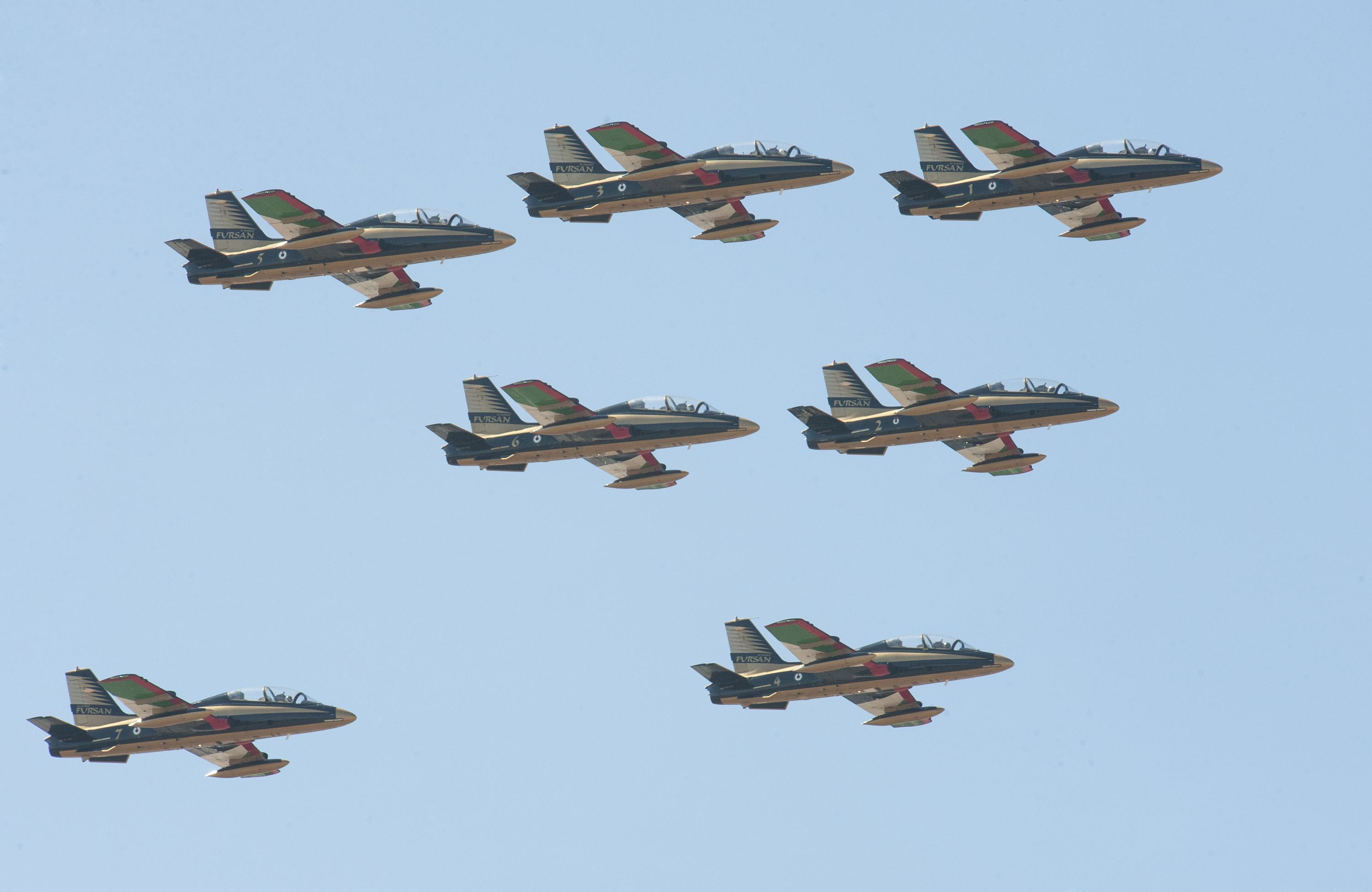
The Al Fursan display team at the 2016 Marrakech Airshow

The Italian Air Force is the largest operator of the MB-339. The service, which received its first examples during 1978, has procured multiple batches and models of the type over the years; for several decades, it has been flown as its principal trainer aircraft. In addition to its use as a general trainer, the MB-339 is also flown by the Frecce Tricolori aerobatic display team; during 1988, three aircraft were lost during a tragic air display accident in Germany.

In October 2013, it was announced that the Italian Air Force intended to replace its MB-339s with newly built M-345s in the long term. The M-345 is intended to replace Italian Air Force MB-339s as a basic trainer, and with the Frecce Tricolori.

Many of its operators, such as the Royal New Zealand Air Force, chose to procure the type during the 1980s and 1990s as a replacement for various aging jet-powered attack aircraft, such as the British-built BAC Strikemaster. Although uncommon amongst most export customers, some operators, such as the United Arab Emirates, have chosen to have several aircraft furnished for aerobatic displays. Emirates aerobatics display team, Al Fursan, operates 7 MB-339A of which 6 were modified to MB-339NAT since 2010. According to a report by Forecast International published in 2014, the later-built MB-339CD model has remained viable as a training platform for various newer fighter aircraft, such as the Panavia Tornado and the Eurofighter Typhoon; however, the type's appeal is waning and shall largely be confined after the 2010s to those nations with weaker economies or facing little military pressure.

=== Combat use ===
==== Argentina ====
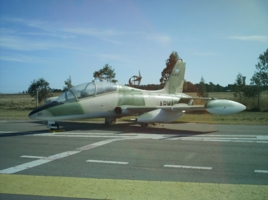
Argentine Naval Aviation MB-339A

The Argentine Naval Aviation (Comando de Aviación Naval or COAN) was the first foreign user of the forerunner MB-326GB, purchasing a batch of eight aircraft during 1969.

During 1980, the COAN ordered ten MB-339As advanced trainer and light attack aircraft. These were delivered in 1981 and were operated by the III Escuadra Naval's 1 Escuadrilla de Ataque. During the Falklands War, late in April 1982, six of them were located at Port Stanley Airport, renamed Base Aérea Militar (BAM) Malvinas. They were the only attack jets to operate from the Falklands, along with four Beech T-34 Turbo-Mentor light attack and trainer aircraft, and twenty-four turboprop FMA IA 58 Pucará attack aircraft of Grupo 3 de Ataque. Other Aermacchis were operated from three mainland bases, these being Almirante Zar, Bahía Blanca, and Río Grande, Tierra del Fuego naval air stations.

On 3 May 1982, Lieutenant Benitez crashed into high ground while approaching the airport at Port Stanley, and was killed. On 21 May an MB-339A flown by Lieutenant Owen Crippa on a reconnaissance flight attacked the Royal Navy amphibious force. The Aermacchi hit the frigate HMS Argonaut, causing light damage. On 27 May, an MB-339A (4-A-114) was shot down by a Blowpipe missile during the Battle for Goose Green, while attempting to attack British ships and landed troops. The pilot, Lieutenant Miguel, was killed. Three MB-339 airframes were captured by the British, with one of these preserved at the South Yorkshire Aircraft Museum, Doncaster.

==== Eritrea ====
During tensions between Eritrea and Ethiopia in the late 1990s, Eritrea started to rebuild its air force. During 1996, the Eritreans ordered six Aermacchi MB-339CEs, with which the first combat unit of the ERAF was founded in 1997. They have proved their worth as training aircraft and even during the early fighting in 1998.

Their initial deployment occurred on 5 June 1998, the same day in which the Ethiopian Air Force (ETAF) also started its operations. During the same afternoon, the Ethiopians reported two attacks of Eritrean MB-339FDs on the city of Mekelle, the capital of the Ethiopian region of Tigray. Reportedly, as many as 44 civilians were killed and 135 injured.

However, on 6 June one of the MB-339s was shot down north of Mekelle. The pilot ejected and was either rescued by a Mi-8 of the ERAF or was captured by local militia. The surviving Eritrean Aermacchis were deployed again on the next day during the fighting around Erde Mattios.

On the morning of 12 June 1998, a pair of Eritrean Mil Mi-8 appeared in low level over Addis Pharmaceutical works, in Adigrat, attempting to bomb it. Their weapons, however, fell a few yards from the plant and caused only minor damage. Only a couple of hours later, four MB-339s rocketed and cluster-bombed against several targets in the city as well. According to Ethiopian sources, four people died and 30 other were injured during those attacks.

On 5 February 1999, the Ethiopian government claimed that a pair of Eritrean MB-339FDs had attacked a fuel depot in Adigrat, some 48 kilometres inside the Ethiopian border, which was important for supplying fuel to the Ethiopian Army.

== Variants ==
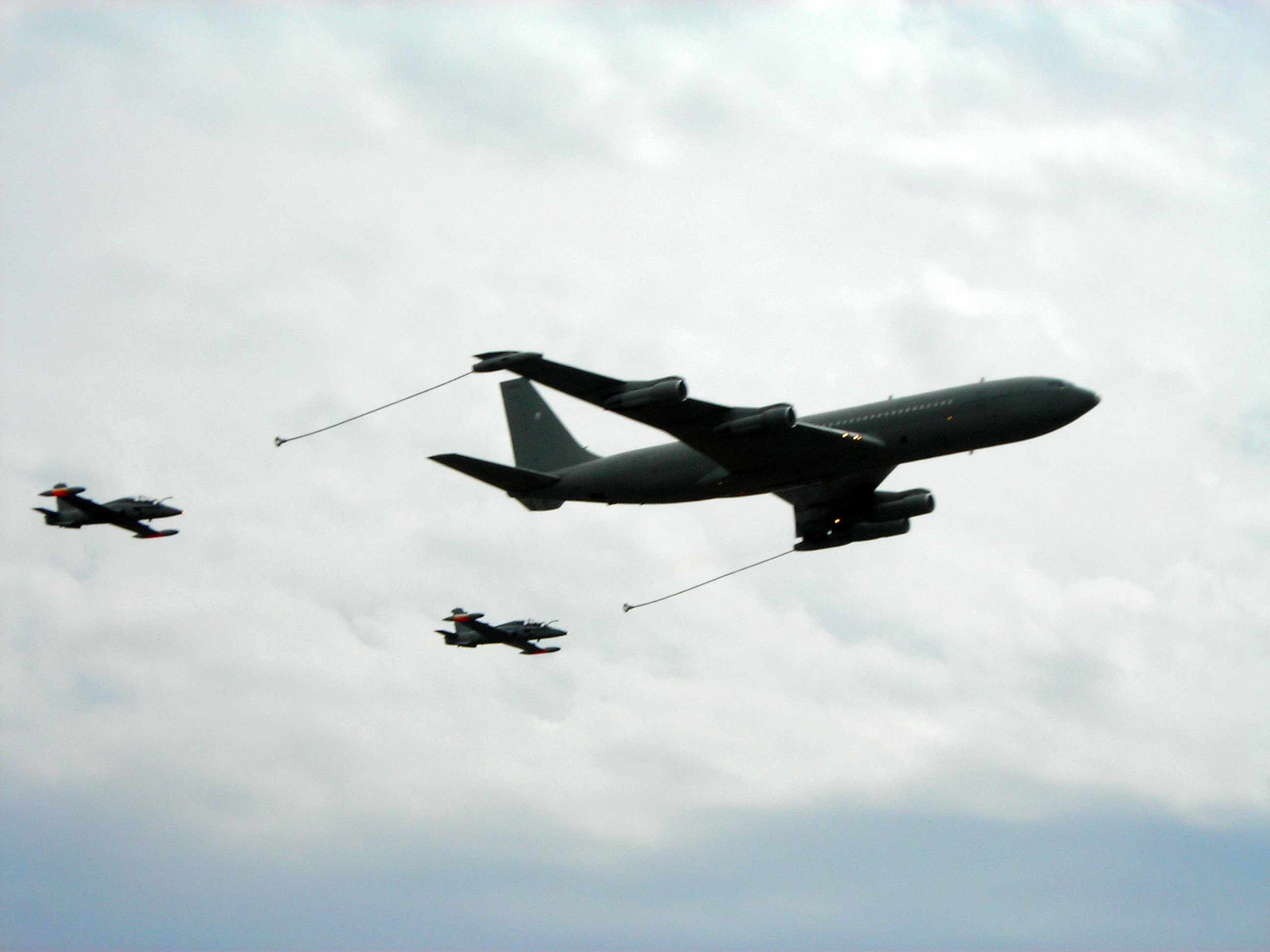
Italian Air Force Boeing 707 refuelling MB-339s

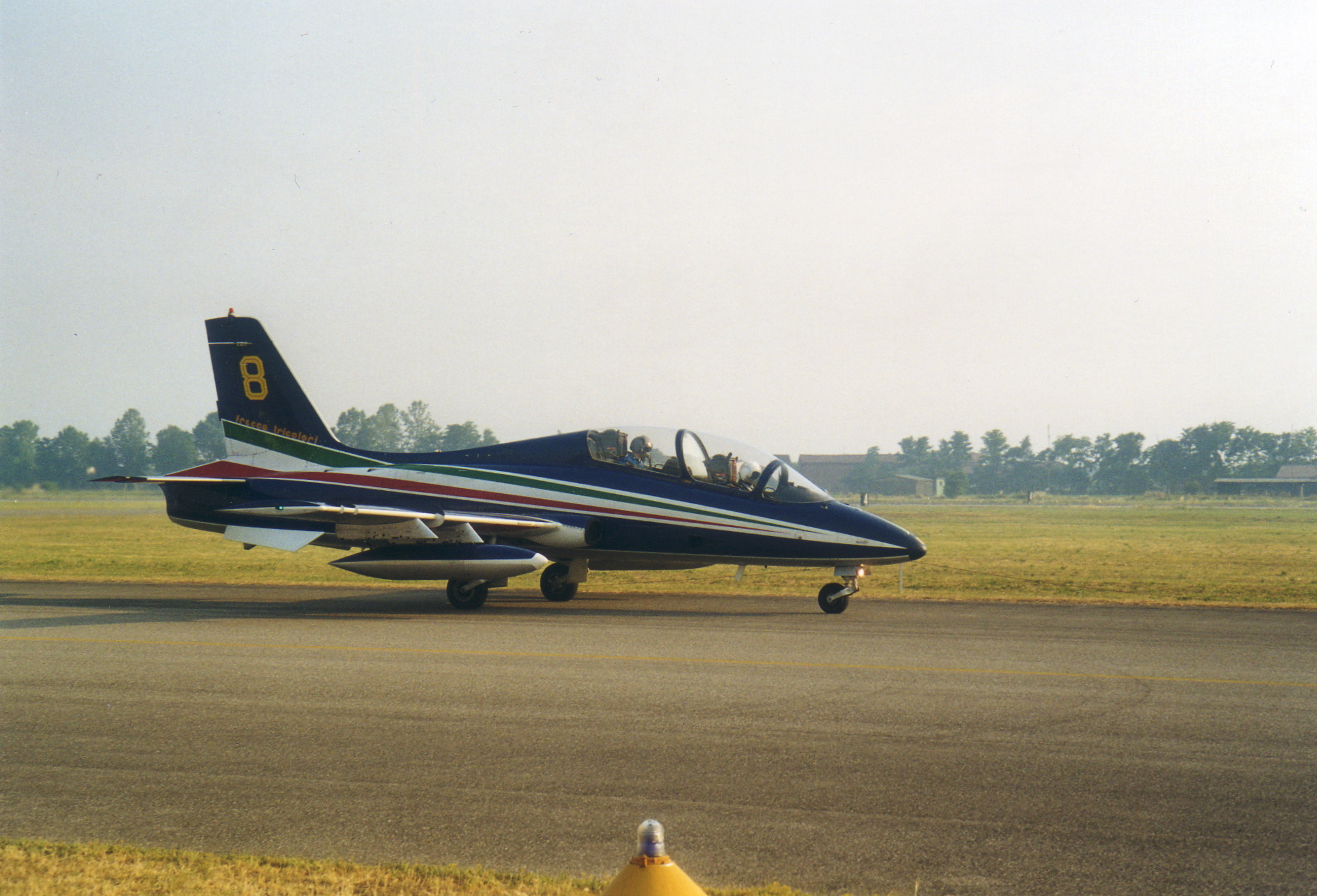
A MB-339PAN

MB-339X
Three prototypes.
MB-339A
Original production variant for Italy. 107 were delivered in three batches 1979–1995 (including MB-339PANs and MB-339RMs). In addition, four delivered to Ghana and five to UAE.

MB-339PAN
Variant for Frecce Tricolori aerobatic team, adding smoke generator but removing tip tanks; 21 newly built or converted from MB-339A.
MB-339RM
Radio and radar calibration variant for Italian Air Force. Three built in 1981 but later converted to MB-339A standard.
MB-339AM
MB-339A version built for Malaysia. 13 built, with deliveries from 1983.
MB-339AN
MB-339A version built for Nigeria. Twelve built from June 1984.
MB-339AP
MB-339A version built for Peru. Sixteen built and delivered from November 1981.

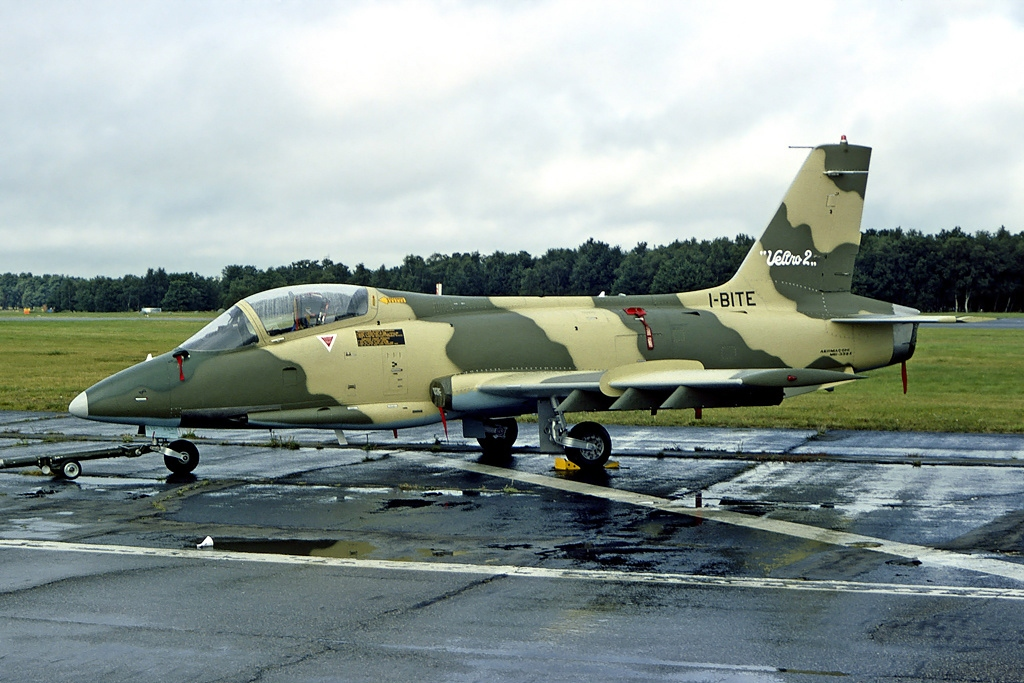
The single-seat MB-339K prototype

MB-339K Veltro II
Single-seat dedicated attack version, first flew 30 May 1980. One built.
MB-339B
Trainer with more powerful (4,400 lbf (19.57 kN)) Viper 680-43 engine. One example built.
MB-339C
Revised trainer version with new, digital avionics.

MB-339CB
New Zealand trainer and weapons training version of MB-339C, powered by Viper 680-43 engine and equipped with laser rangefinder, radar detection, AIM-9L Sidewinder and AGM-65 Maverick capability. Eighteen built and delivered from March 1991. – 16 survivors – 8 airworthy with SDTS in France, the remainder on museum display in New Zealand
MB-339CD
MB-339C for Italy, with modernised flight controls and avionics, but retaining original 4,000 lbf (17.79 kW) Viper 632-43 of MB-339A. 30 built.
MB-339FD ("Full Digital")
Export version of the MB-339CD
MB-339CE
MB-339C version built for Eritrea powered by Viper 680-43. Six built.
MB-339CM
MB-339C version being built for Malaysia.

MB-339 T-Bird II (Lockheed T-Bird II)
Version for U.S. JPATS competition, with 4,000 lbf Viper 680-582.

== Operators ==
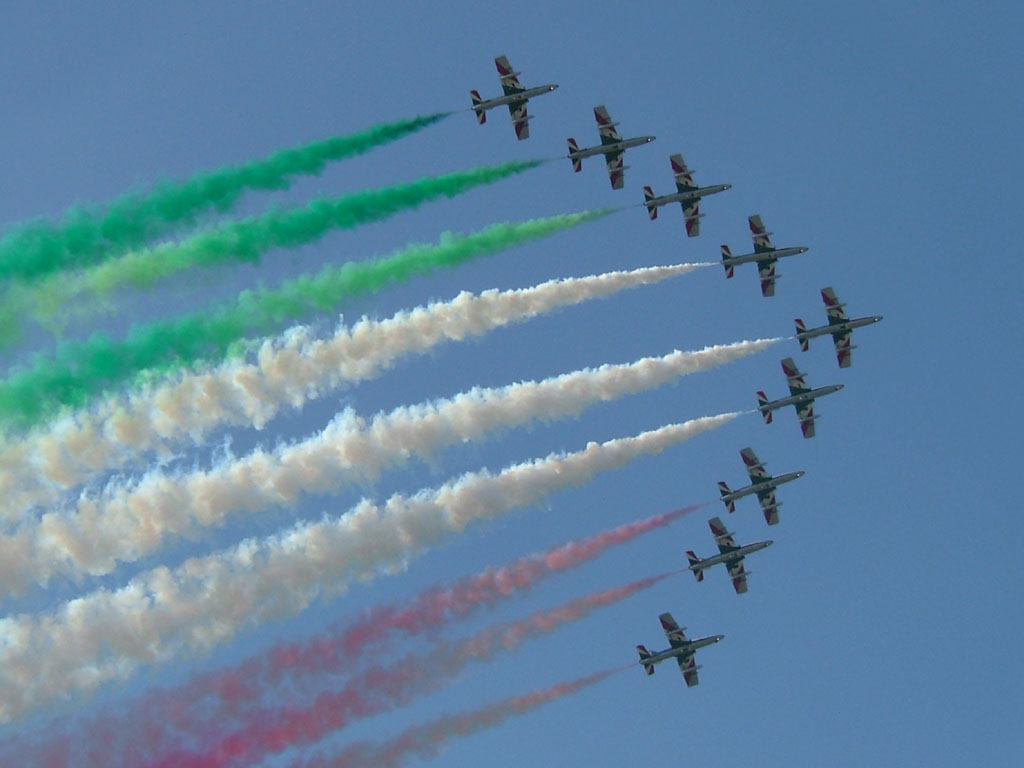
Frecce Tricolori at RIAT 2005 in their anniversary year

Eritrea

- Eritrean Air Force operates 5 MB-339CE.

Italy

- Italian Air Force operates 72 MB-339A MLU, 30 MB-339CD, 21 MB-339PAN and 3 MB-339RM.

United Arab Emirates

- United Arab Emirates Air Force operates 10 MB-339NAT (inc. 4 ex-Italian).

France

- SDTS operates 8 MB-339CB, 9 purchased from Draken International. 1 crashed at Nîmes-Garons Airport 10 of October 2023

=== Former ===
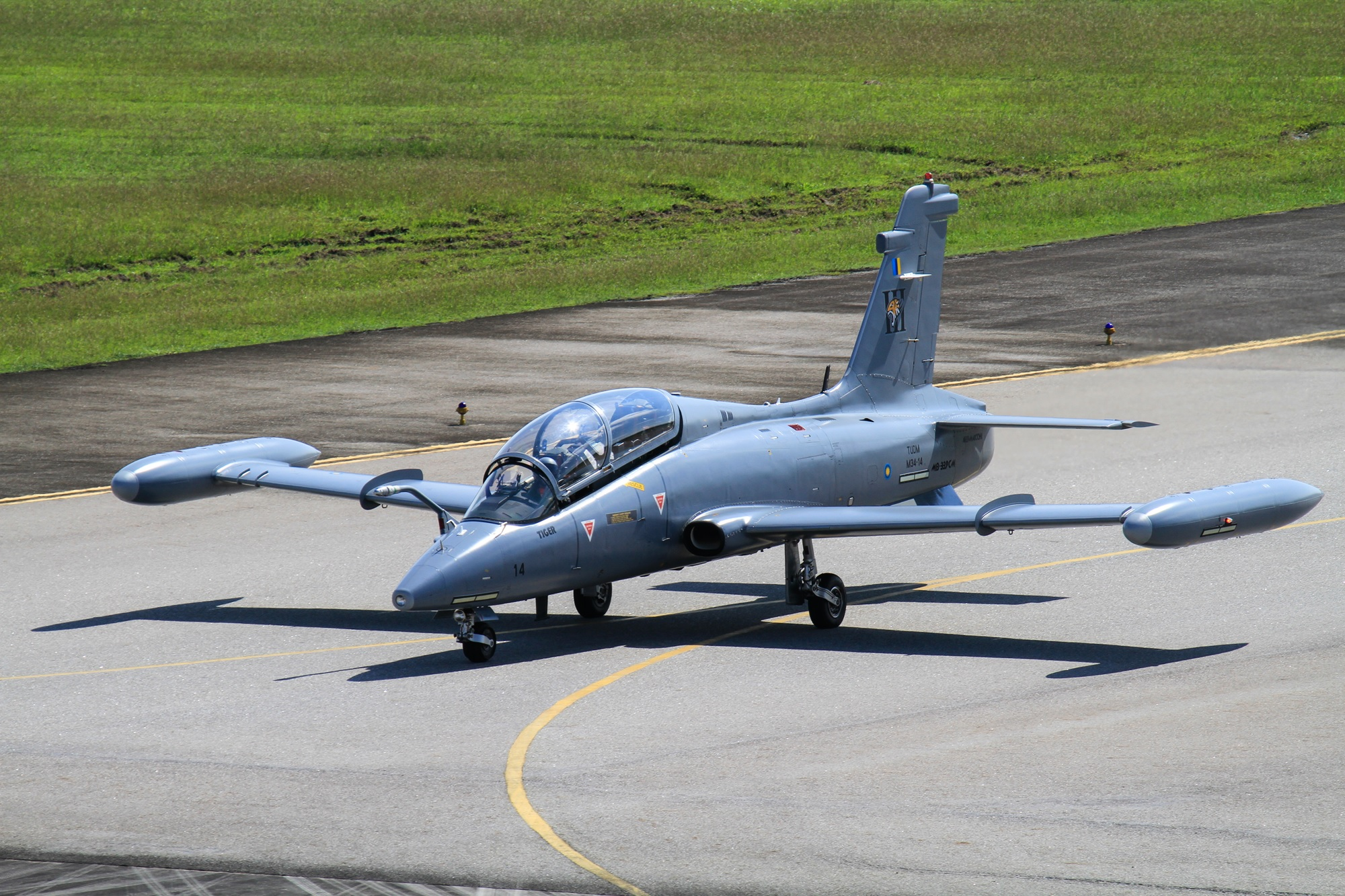
RMAF Aermacchi MB-339 in 2015

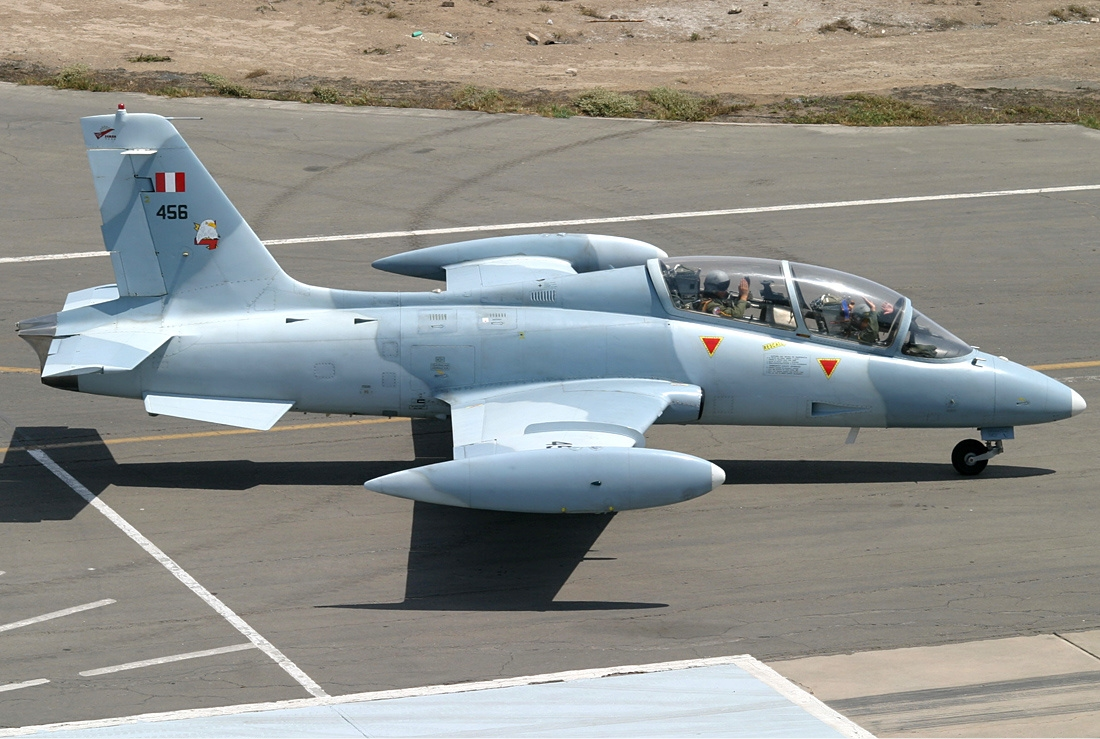
Peruvian Air Force Aermacchi MB-339AP in 2010

Argentina

- Argentine Naval Aviation 10 originally delivered, withdrawn in the 1990s.

Ghana

- Ghana Air Force operated 4 MB-339A.

Malaysia

- Royal Malaysian Air Force operated 13 MB-339AM and 8 MB-339CM.

New Zealand

- Royal New Zealand Air Force received 18 MB-339CB used by No. 14 Squadron RNZAF between 1991 and 2002.

Nigeria

- Nigerian Air Force operated 12 MB-339AN, now stored.

Peru

- Peruvian Air Force operated 14 MB-339AP, now stored.

USA

- Draken International a private defense contractor purchased 9 MB-339CB from the Royal New Zealand Air Force.

== Specifications (MB-339A) ==
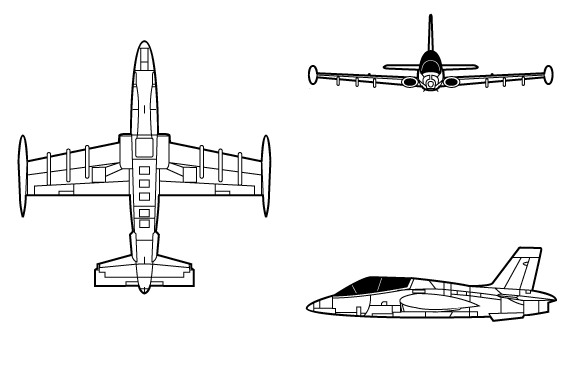
Orthographic projection of the Aermacchi MB-339A

Data from Jane's All The World's Aircraft 1980–81

General characteristics

- Crew: 2
- Length: 10.97 m (36 ft 0 in)
- Wingspan: 10.86 m (35 ft 8 in)
- Height: 3.60 m (11 ft 10 in)
- Wing area: 19.3 m^{2} (208 sq ft)
- Aspect ratio: 5.26:1
- Airfoil: root: NACA 64A-114 (mod); tip: NACA 64A-212 (mod)
- Empty weight: 3,075 kg (6,779 lb)
- Gross weight: 4,400 kg (9,700 lb) (clean)
- Max takeoff weight: 5,897 kg (13,001 lb) (with external stores)
- Fuel capacity: 1,413 L (311 imp gal; 373 US gal) internal fuel
- Powerplant: 1 × Rolls-Royce Viper Mk. 632 turbojet engine, 17.8 kN (4,000 lbf) thrust

Performance

- Maximum speed: 898 km/h (558 mph, 485 kn) at sea level
- Stall speed: 148.5 km/h (92.3 mph, 80.2 kn)
- Never exceed speed: 926 km/h (575 mph, 500 kn) (EAS: Mach 0.82)
- Range: 1,760 km (1,090 mi, 950 nmi) (internal fuel)
- Ferry range: 2,110 km (1,310 mi, 1,140 nmi) (with two drop tanks)
- Service ceiling: 14,630 m (48,000 ft)
- g limits: +8.0, -4.0
- Rate of climb: 33.50 m/s (6,595 ft/min)

Armament

- Guns: Provision for two 12.7 mm M2 Browning or two 30mm DEFA cannon in under wing pods
- Hardpoints: 6 with a capacity of up to 1,815 kg (4,001 lb) of weapons
- Rockets: pods for Zuni or SNEB unguided rockets.
- Missiles: AIM-9 Sidewinder or R.550 Magic air-to-air missiles
- Bombs: general-purpose bombs

== See also ==
Related development

- Aermacchi MB-326

Aircraft of comparable role, configuration, and era

- Aero L-39 Albatros
- Aero L-159 ALCA
- BAE Systems Hawk
- Dassault/Dornier Alpha Jet
- IAR 99
- Soko G-4 Super Galeb

== Sources ==
- Braybrook, Roy. "Aermacchi MB-339C". Air International, September 1992, Vol. 43, No. 3. pp. 137–144.
- Chant, Christopher. Air War in the Falklands 1982. Oxford, UK, Osprey Combat Aircraft 28, 2001. ISBN 978-1-84176-293-7.
- Ethell, Jeffrey and Alfred Price. Air War South Atlantic.London: Sidgwick & Jackson, 1983. ISBN 978-0-283-99035-9.
- "Initial Malaysian MB-339CMs Delivered". Air International, April 2009, Vol.76, No. 4. p. 7.
- Jackson, Paul. Jane's All The World's Aircraft 2003–2004. Coulsdon, UK: Jane's Information Group, 2003. ISBN 978-0-7106-2537-3.
- "Mentor with a Pedigree: Aeronautica Macchi's MB-339". Air International, June 1978, Vol. 14 no. 6. pp. 267–276, 310–311.
- Taylor, John W.R. (ed.) Jane's All The World's Aircraft 1980–81. London: Jane's Publishing. ISBN 978-0-7106-0705-8.
- Wright, Matthew. "Not all black for the winged Kiwis". Air International, May 1992, Vol. 42, No. 5. pp. 249–257.
