= She'eb =

Coordinates: 15°51′08″N 39°02′58″E

She'eb (Tigre: ሽዕብ) is a town in the Northern Red Sea region of Eritrea. It lies on the fertile plain at the foot of the eastern escarpment of the Eritrean Highlands.

== History ==
It was the site of a massacre during the Eritrean War of Independence. The entire town was razed and burnt to the ground in 1988, and the people who had not been able to flee were ordered to assemble and subsequently run over with tanks while those trying to flee were shot. The massacre left about 400 people dead, including many elderly and children who had not been able to flee in advance. The Ethiopian army claimed that the town was notorious for harboring Eritrean rebels. They proceeded to kill at least 100 more civilians in neighboring villages.

The town has recovered since the independence of Eritrea in 1991 (de facto)/1993 (de jure) and is now the scene of a thriving agricultural industry. It is connected by asphalt road to the port of Massawa via Gahtelai and using the same road, there is a junction at the village of Shebah with a gravel road winding up the eastern escarpment to Serejeqa to connect with the Asmara-Keren asphalt road, thereby connecting the area with all three of Eritrea's major cities.
