= Eritrean Air Force =

Air warfare branch of Eritrea's military

- Founded: 1994; 32 years ago
- Country: Eritrea
- Type: Air force
- Role: Aerial warfare
- Size: 20 aircraft (2026)
- Part of: Eritrean Defence Forces
- Headquarters: Asmara
- Engagements: Eritrean–Ethiopian War; Tigray War

Commanders
- Current commander: Teklai Habteselassie

Insignia
- Roundel

- Fin flash

Aircraft flown
- Fighter: Su-27
- Helicopter: Mi-17, Bell 412
- Attack helicopter: Mi-24
- Trainer: Su-27
- Transport: Y-12, Beechcraft King Air 200

The Eritrean Air Force (ERAF) is the air service branch of the Eritrean Defence Forces.

== History ==
The Eritrean Air Force was established shortly after Eritrean War of Independence in 1994. It was first established by Commander Habtezion Hadgu, who used to be an Ethiopian Air force pilot during the Derg regime, and later defected in the late 1980s to the Eritrean People Liberation Front (EPLF), during the Eritrean War of Independence. When the air force was established, Commander Hadgu called many Eritrean officers who had formerly served in the Ethiopian Air force, including Col. Abraham (Chief of Staff), Col. Melake, Col. Mesfin, Col. Dr. Efrem and others, like Major Shekay, who came from Lebanon. His deputy was a veteran EPLF fighter, Major General Wedi Kahsay until he was sent to the northern zone as a commander of a regiment in the army. The director of Air Force Intelligence and Administration was also a veteran EPLF fighter, Col. Mussie Lebassi, a member of the 72nd intelligence unit of the EPLF, which was dissolved in 1994. After the Eritrean–Ethiopian War, Commander Habtezion and Col. Mussie were later suspended from the air force. Eventually, the air force was taken over by Major General Teklay Habteselasie, who is also the commander of the Sawa military training camp.

The original force was composed of abandoned Ethiopian Air Force aircraft that were left shortly after Eritrea's War of Independence. Several of the abandoned MiG-21s, which were captured from the Ethiopian Air Force, are believed to be no longer in service. The main airbase is at Asmara International Airport, which is a combined civil/military base. Serials are sometimes, but not always, worn with 'ERAF' in front of the digits.

The air force has experienced a number of notable defections in recent years. In 2012 two high-ranking officers flew the air force's only luxury airplane out of the country to Saudi Arabia and sought asylum.

== Eritrean-Ethiopian War ==
Expansion of the Eritrean Air Force (ERAF) did not occur until the Eritrean-Ethiopian War in which the two air forces fought for superiority. In a sort of arms race Eritrea responded to Ethiopia's purchase of Su-27s with a purchase of MiG-29s. In 2000 the ERAF bought eight Su-25s from Georgia, and six more MiG-29s from Moldova. In 2003 Eritrea also acquired several Su-27s. The Eritrean Air force trained and grew enormously in a short period and was able to challenge the Ethiopian Air Force during the war. Commander Habtezion, along with young Air Force pilots, retaliated in short time after the Ethiopian Air force, led by popular pilot General Bezabh Petros – in captivity during the Eritrean War of Independence and recaptured again in the 1998 war – bombed Asmara.

== Organization ==
Eritrean Air Force airbases

=== Structure ===
- Headquarters of the Eritrean Air Force (Asmara, Eritrea)
- Asmara Airport
- Assab International Airport
- Sawa Airport (Forto, Eritrea)
- Massawa International Airport (Massawa, Eritrea)

=== Commanders ===
No.	Portrait	Name (birth–death)	Term of office			Ref.
No.	Portrait	Name (birth–death)	Took office	Left office	Time in office	Ref.
Commander of the Eritrean Air Force
1		Brigadier General Habtezion Hadgu	1994	January 2003		
2		Colonel Abraham Ogbaselasse	?	?		
3		Major General Teklai Habteselassie	circa 2003	Incumbent		

== Aircraft ==
=== Current inventory ===
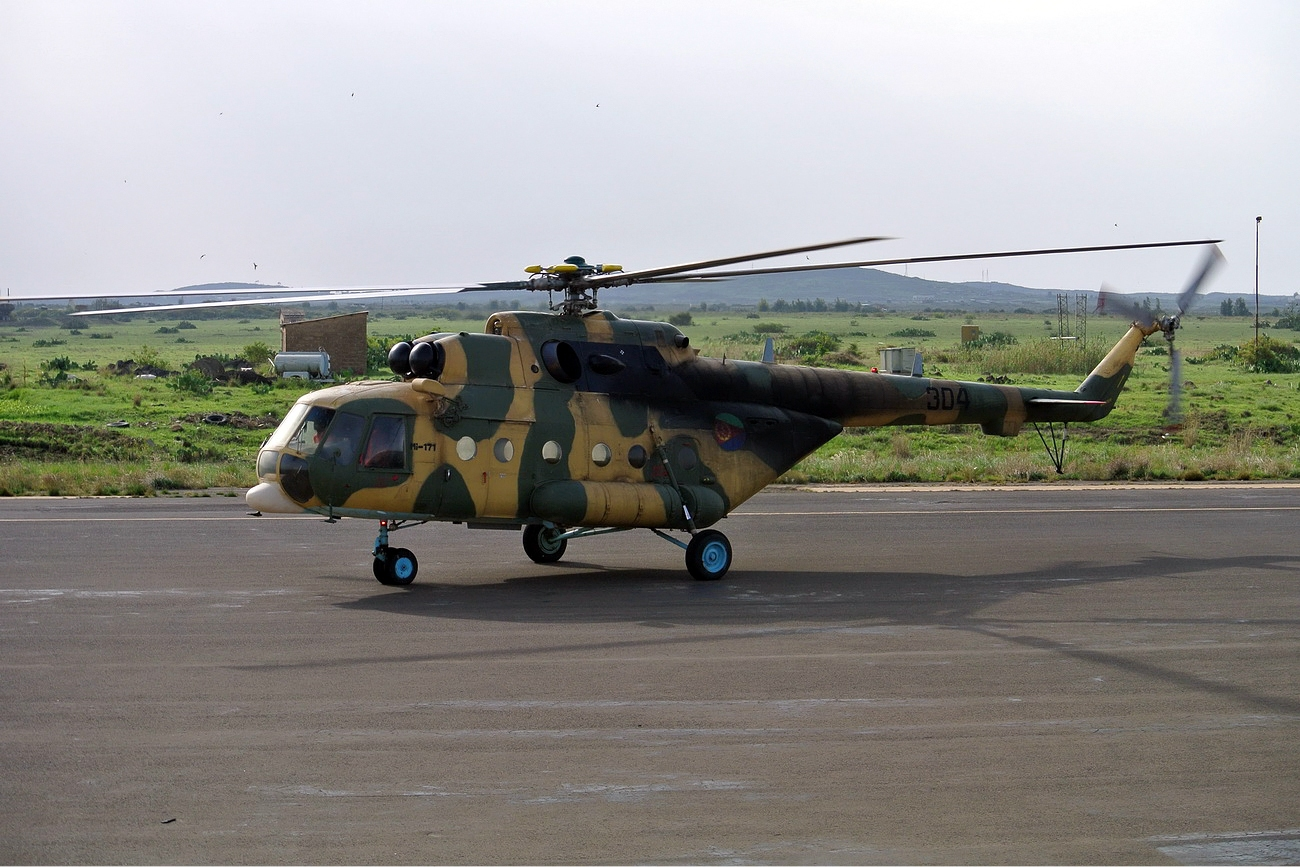
Eritrean Air Force Mi-17

Aircraft	Origin	Type	Variant	In service	Notes
Combat aircraft
Sukhoi Su-27	Russia	Multirole	SK	1	
Transport
Super King Air	United States	Utility	200	1	
Harbin Y-12	China	Transport		4	
Helicopters
Bell 412	United States	Utility		1	
Mil Mi-17	Russia	Transport / Utility	Mi-17/171	6	
Mil Mi-24	Russia	Attack	Mi-35	6	
Trainer aircraft
Sukhoi Su-27	Russia	Jet trainer	UB	1	

Due to the lack of technical expertise with Russian aircraft, the Eritrean government maintained a contractual agreement with a Russian parastatal defense company to help upkeep its fleet of Russian manufactured fighter aircraft such as the MiG-21bis-SAU, Su-25K, MiG-29SE/UB and Su-27SK/UB. However this agreement ended since it was in violation of United Nations Security Council Resolution 1907 barring military technical assistance to Eritrea. It is believed that Eritrea's fleet of Russian fighter aircraft is suffering from a chronic lack of maintenance and as a result are rarely flown. The same problem with the Italian MB-339CE.

=== Retired aircraft ===
Retired aircraft include MiG-29SE/UB, MB-339CE, MiG-21bis-SAU, Su-25K.
