= Nasair =

Airline of Eritrea

NasAir ናዜር
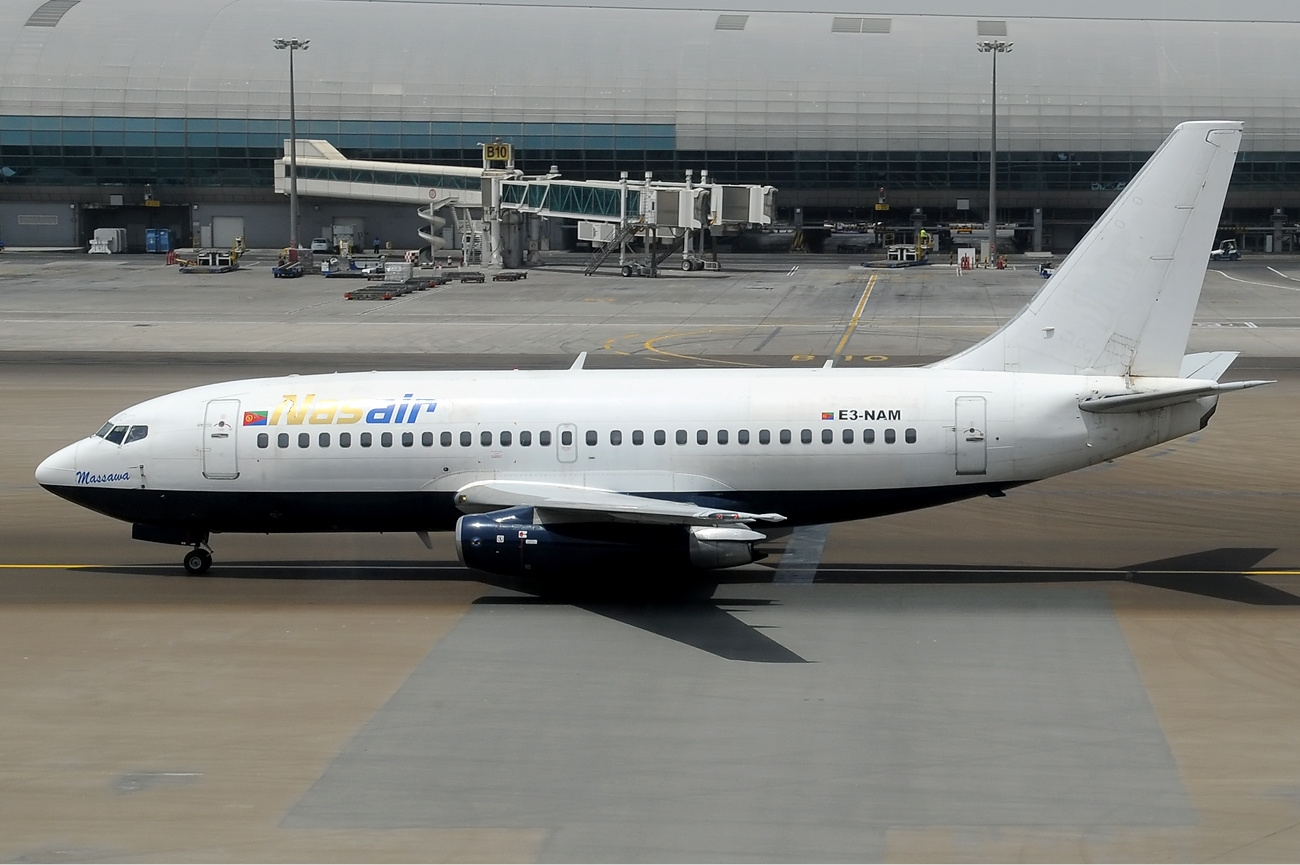
- A Nasair Boeing 737-200
IATA	ICAO	Call sign
UE	NAS	NASAIRWAYS
- Founded: 2006
- Ceased operations: 2014
- Hubs: Asmara International Airport
- Fleet size: 1
- Destinations: 7
- Headquarters: Asmara, Eritrea
- Website: www.nadalia.aero

Nasair, officially known as Nasair Eritrea, was an airline based in Asmara, Eritrea. It operated scheduled flights to domestic destinations in Eritrea, as well as limited scheduled services to the Middle East and Eastern Africa. As of May 2014 the airline was reported to be "out of business."

== History ==
The company was founded in 2006 and is one of three divisions of the Nasair Group. The three subsidiaries of the Group are:

- Nasair Consultant – Provided airline and airport consultancy services.
- Nasair Air Service – The airline. Provided domestic, regional and international scheduled passenger and cargo services.
- Nasair Maintenance Center – Would have provided aircraft maintenance services for own aircraft and those of other airline companies, had regulatory approval been obtained.

== Destinations ==
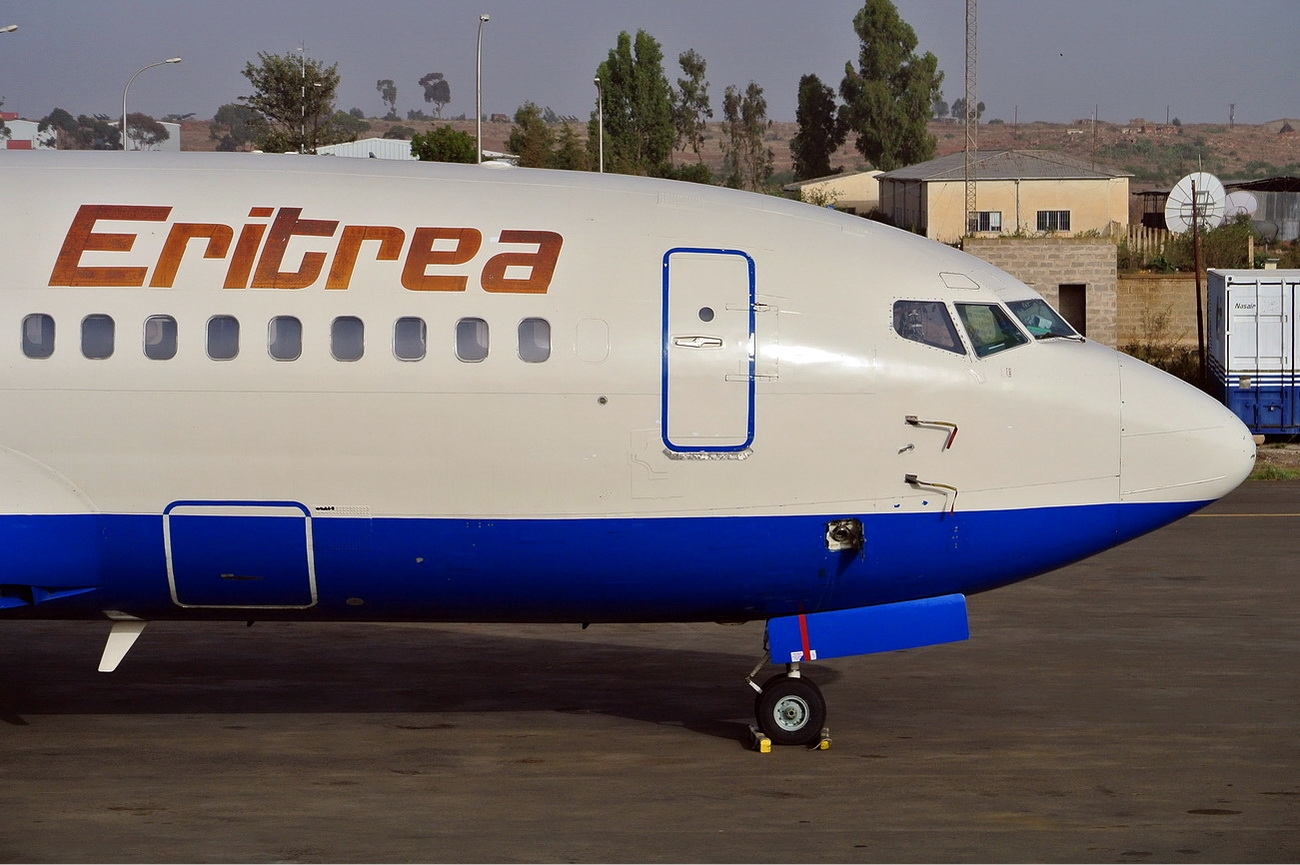
A Nasair Boeing 737-200

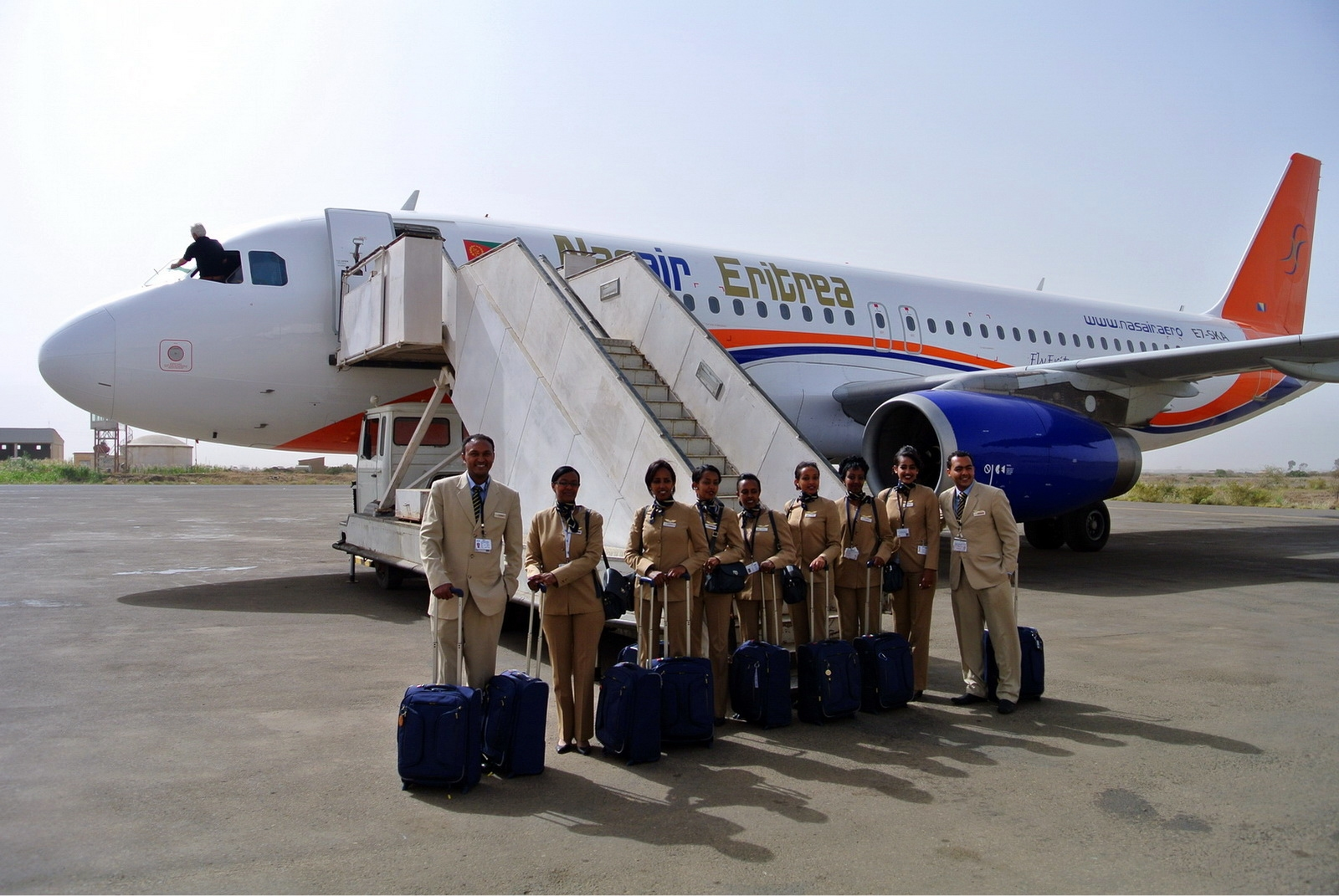
Nasair staff and an Airbus A320

As of November 2012 Nasair served the following destinations:

Africa
Eritrea

- Massawa (Massawa International Airport) Hub

Kenya

- Nairobi (Jomo Kenyatta International Airport)

Sudan

- Khartoum (Khartoum International Airport)

South Sudan

- Juba – (Juba International Airport)

Uganda

- Entebbe (Entebbe International Airport)

Asia
United Arab Emirates

- Dubai (Dubai International Airport)

Saudi Arabia

- Dammam (King Fahd International Airport)
- Jeddah (King Abdulaziz International Airport)

== Fleet ==
The Nasair fleet included the following aircraft (as of November 2012):

Nasair fleet
Aircraft	In fleet	Orders	Notes
Boeing 737-200 Adv	1	0	
