= Gahtelai =

Gahtelai (Arabic: غاهتلاي) is the name of a river, town and plain situated in the Northern Red Sea administrative region of Eritrea. It is not the correct meaning of Gahtelai written in Tigrinya. Because the word is of Saho "gahte" means is back and "lai" means water. Gahtelai Means back water, because the river is seasonal . In addition the region is mainly inhabited by the Saho people.

== Overview ==
The name refers to the unpredictable rainfall patterns in the village. A long time ago, the rainy season was not consistent; it rained and stopped raining at any time of the year. So, people in Gahtelay uttered the word ‘Gahteley’ or ‘water is back’ whenever it started raining to express their feeling of relief. The town was then named Gahtelay. For travelers in the area, Gahtelai was one of the hottest and driest places they could ever pass through and as if the sweltering heat and dryness was not enough, the vast plain, which is surrounded by hills, exposed the travellers to attacks from various enemies and bandits. Today, thanks in large to aid from Israel and the Mashav Centre for International Cooperation, the Gahtelai plain is an agricultural region using drip irrigation technology to harvest melons, tomatoes and various other vegetables and fruits.

There is a market town in the middle of the plain, on the road between Asmara and Massawa called Gahtelai, about 80 km from Asmara and 35 km from the port of Massawa. In this town, there is another newly constructed asphalt-road (completed in 2005) that connects Gahtelai with the town of She'eb on the northern end of the valley about 50 km away.

Gahtelai is also the name of a seasonal river that starts as runoff from the eastern escarpments of the Eritrean highlands and snakes its way through the town and plain (with the same names) to empty in the Red Sea just north of Massawa.
