= Massawa International Airport =

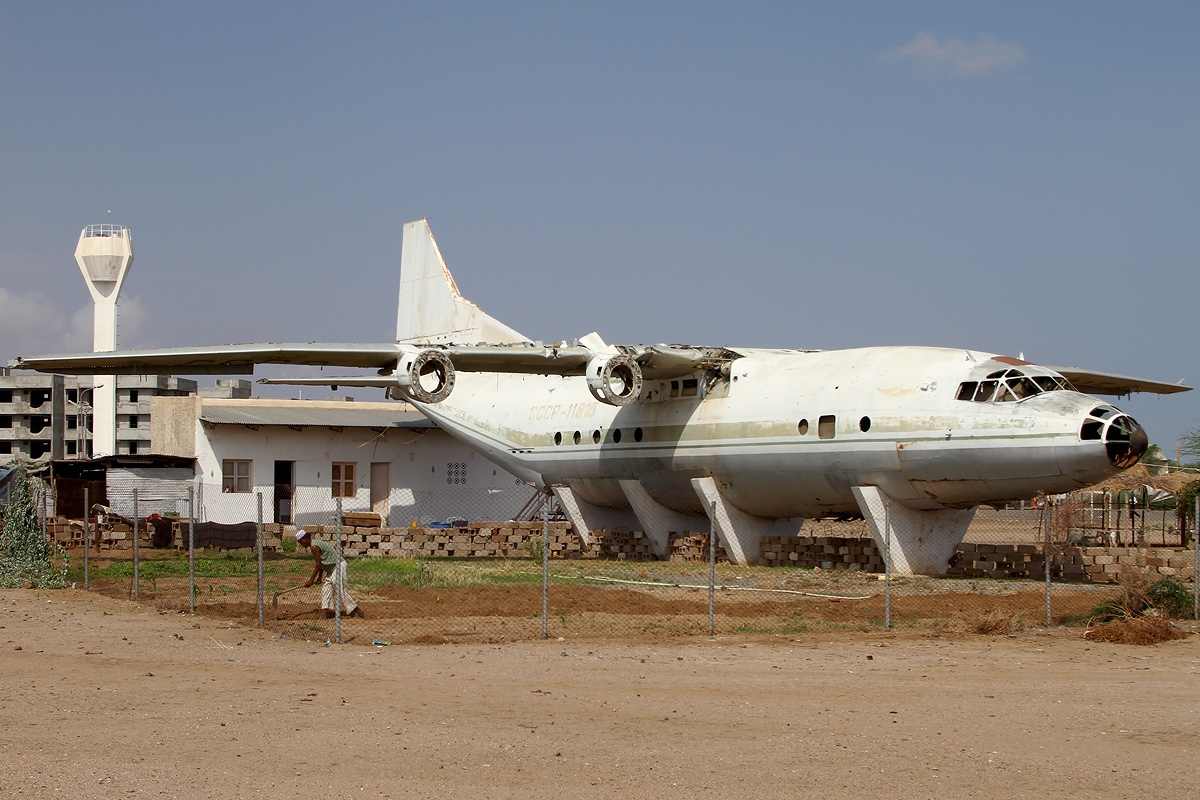
- A retired Antonov An-12BP near the Massawa airport's bus terminal.
- IATA: MSW; ICAO: HHMS

Summary
- Airport type: Military/Public
- Serves: Massawa
- Location: Massawa, Eritrea
- Elevation AMSL: 206 ft / 63 m
- Coordinates: 15°41′0″N 39°22′5″E

Map
- Location of airport in Eritrea

Runways
Direction	Length		Surface
Direction	ft	m	Surface
07/25	11,483	3,500	Asphalt

Massawa International Airport (IATA: MSW, ICAO: HHMS) is an airport in Massawa, a city in the Northern Red Sea region of Eritrea. It is considered to be the successor of the Otumlo Airport, also in Massawa, which was destroyed in 1941.

It is one of Eritrea's major airports.

== History ==
The airport was opened by the Italian authorities in 1935, when the Italian invasion of Ethiopia began, under the name Aeroporto internazionale di Massaua. It was initially used for military aircraft employed in the invasion, and for military transport into conflict areas. In 1936, Ala Littoria, a civilian service with postal service from Massaua toward Asmara and Mogadishu, began operation at the airport.

In the last colonial period in Italian Eritrea, a 1,970 km airway line was established between Massawa-Djibouti-Berbera-Galadi-Mogadishu.

After WW2 it was rebuilt at a nearby location and enlarged, under the name of Massawa International Airport.

As of 2014, the airport accommodated only domestic flights since the companies that formed it do not have international licenses.

The Eritrea Investment Centre has proposed a new $60 million development project at the airport. Additionally, it has offered incentives on taxation, provision of supplies that the market does not already provide, provision of heavy machinery, and easy access to government loans.

== Airlines ==
There are no active airlines operating from Massawa. Only private jets.

- Nasair 2006–2014
- BurkinaUruka 2009–2011
- Eritrean Air Force still uses the airport as one of their three airbases.
