= Asmara International Airport =

International airport in Asmara, Eritrea

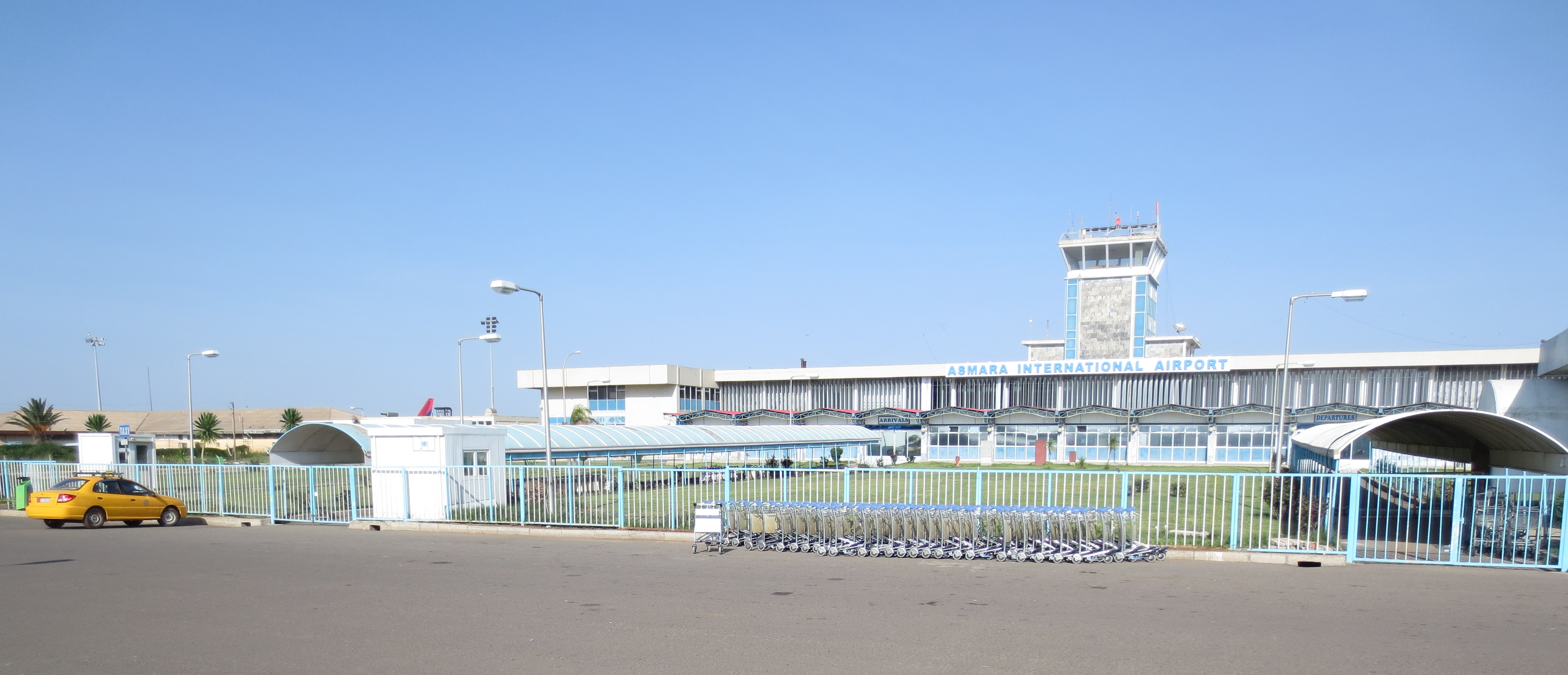
- IATA: ASM; ICAO: HHAS

Summary
- Airport type: Military/Public
- Serves: Asmara, Eritrea
- Elevation AMSL: 7,661 ft (2,335 m)
- Coordinates: 15°17′30.67″N 38°54′38.40″E

Map
- Location of airport in Eritrea

Runways
| Direction | Length | | Surface |
| Direction | ft | m | Surface |
|---|---|---|---|
| 07/25 | 9,842 | 3,000 | Asphalt |

Asmara International Airport (IATA: ASM, ICAO: HHAS) is the international airport of Asmara, the capital of Eritrea. It is the country's largest airport and the only one receiving regularly scheduled services as of 2017.

== History ==
The airport was constructed by the Italian colonial authorities in 1922, the first such facility to be opened in Italian Eritrea with the name "Aeroporto di Gura". It served as the main military airport in the territory. In the mid-1930s, the airport (enlarged and now called Aeroporto Civile di Asmara-Umberto Maddalena) began offering civilian and commercial flights.

On 7 July 1935, an agreement was signed with the British airline, Imperial Airways, to connect Asmara to Khartoum. A regular Kassala-Khartoum-Asmara-Massawa 770 km commercial route was subsequently started with a Caproni 133 of the Italian Ala Littoria.

Additionally, a regular Asmara-Assab- Mogadishu commercial route was started in summer 1935, with an Ala Littoria's Caproni Ca.133 providing 13-hour flights from the Mogadishu airport to Italian Eritrea. The aircraft had a maximal capacity of 18 passengers, which at the time was a record.

In 1936, Ala Littoria launched an intercontinental connection -called "Linea dell'Impero"- between Mogadishu-Asmara-Khartoum-Tripoli and Rome. The voyage lasted four days and was one of the first long range flights in the world.

During World War II, the airport was nearly destroyed by the British. It was later renovated in the 1950s, and reopened to offer flights to Addis Ababa and other cities in Ethiopia. With Eritrea's independence in the 1990s, the airport became an international portal to the new nation.

During the Eritrean-Ethiopian War, the airport was bombed two times by Ethiopia in 1998 and 2000. In April 2003, after improvements to the airport's runways, Eritrean Airlines started regular services between Asmara and Frankfurt, Milan, Nairobi and Rome. In 2004, it served 136,526 passengers (+11.8% vs. 2003).

In October 2013, Lufthansa, which was considered the premier foreign airline in Asmara, suspended service to Frankfurt via Jeddah. A representative said Germany and Eritrea had to reach a new air transport agreement. According to the United States Department of State, the flight was suspended because Lufthansa had a large amount of unconvertible nakfa in Eritrea. The airline decided to terminate the service in 2014.

In 2018, after renewed relations with Ethiopia, the airport started accepting flights from Addis Ababa for the first time since the war. In July 2024, the Eritrean Civil Aviation Authority ordered Ethiopian Airlines to suspend flights to Eritrea by September, citing "consistent and persistent malicious trading practices [and] systemic and organized passengers' luggage theft, pilferage, damage prolonged delays, and loss with no compensation in particular, coupled with unjustified and unwarranted price hikes and other irregularities witnessed." as the reasons.

== Facilities ==
The airport has capacity restrictions due to its small terminal, short runway and high 2300 m altitude. Lufthansa operated Airbus A340 aircraft on a FRA-JED-ASM service as recently as 2012.

The airport is also an Eritrean Air Force base.

== Airlines and destinations ==
As of April 2026, there was scheduled non-stop service from Asmara International Airport to six destinations.

| Airlines | Destinations |
|---|---|
| Etihad Airways | Abu Dhabi |
| Egyptair | Cairo |
| Flydubai | Dubai–International |
| Flynas | Jeddah |
| Tarco Air | Port Sudan |
| Turkish Airlines | Istanbul, Juba |
