= 1988 in aviation =

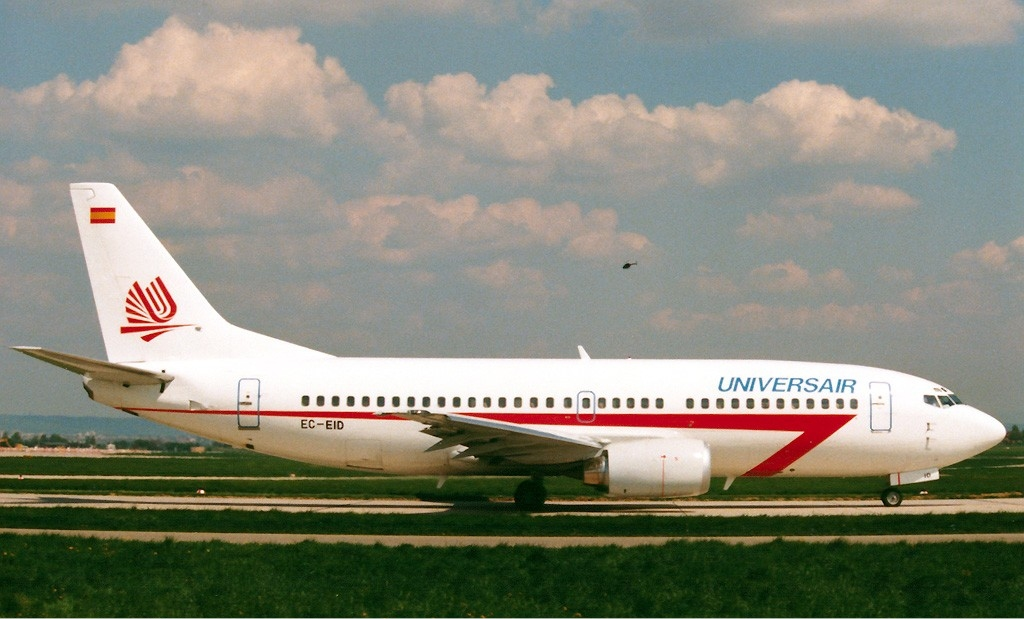
Universair Boeing 737-300 in 1988

This is a list of aviation-related events in 1988.

== Events ==
=== January ===
- During the first week of January, the Iraqi Air Force hits a Greek-owned commercial cargo ship with an Exocet missile in the Persian Gulf.
- During early January, Iran experiments with the use of AGM-65 Maverick air-to-surface missiles in antishipping strikes in the Persian Gulf. The Maverick's warhead proves too small to inflict significant damage on merchant ships.
- January 1 – The United States Government begins to track the on-time-arrival and baggage-handling performance of United States airlines.
- January 15 – Since January 1, Iraq has conducted five airstrikes against shipping in the Persian Gulf and one against urban and economic targets in Iran, while Iran has carried out two air attacks against Persian Gulf shipping, but none against urban and economic targets in Iraq.
- January 19 – Mid Pacific Air ceases all passenger service to Hawaii. It will cease all cargo service to Hawaii a month later.
- January 26 – The French Ministry of Defense approves full-scale development of the Dassault Rafale.
- January 27 – An Iraqi Air Force Mirage F-1 flies an attack profile against the United States Navy dock landing ship USS Portland (LSD-37) in the Persian Gulf, apparently not realizing the identity of its target. Another United States Navy ship establishes radio contact with the Mirage pilot and warns him off before he can fire at Portland.
- January 30 – A Boeing 747 sets a new around-the-world record of 36 hours 54 minutes.
- January 31 – Since January 16, Iraq has conducted 11 airstrikes against shipping in the Persian Gulf and Iran has carried out two. Neither country has attacked urban and economic targets on the other's territory.

=== February ===
- In retaliation for a bomb attack on a bank in South-West Africa, South African Air Force Mirage aircraft attack the headquarters of the South West Africa People's Organization (SWAPO).
- During the month, the United States Navy withdraws the last of the eight RH-53D Sea Stallion minesweeping helicopters it had deployed to the Persian Gulf in August 1987 to assist in the clearing of Iraqi and Iranian naval mines.
- In mid-February, an Iraqi Air Force Tupolev Tu-16 (NATO reporting name "Badger") bomber fires Silkworm missiles which come within eight nautical miles (15 km) of a convoy escorted by United States Navy ships.
- February 7 – The Iraqi Air Force strikes Iran's Kharg Island for the first time since November 4, 1987.
- February 9 – The Islamic Republic of Iran Air Force makes rare use of its F-14 Tomcats in an air-to-air combat role, ambushing two Iraqi Air Force Mirage F-1s as they turn north to attack Farsi Island. Using AIM-9 Sidewinder air-to-air missiles, they shoot down at least one of the Mirages. Iran has lost most of its air power during the course of the Iran–Iraq War, but appears to have about seven to nine F-14s, 20 F-4 Phantom IIs, and 20 F-5 Freedom Fighters that still are operational.
- February 13 – The United States Navy guided-missile destroyer USS Chandler (DDG-996) comes within seconds of firing at an Iraqi Air Force Mirage F-1 flyng an attack profile before the Iraqi pilot turns away without firing.
- February 15 – Since February 1, Iraq has conducted four airstrikes against shipping in the Persian Gulf and 27 against urban and economic targets in Iran, while Iran has carried out three air attacks against Persian Gulf shipping but none against urban or economic targets in Iraq.
- February 18 – The airline Binter Canarias, a subsidiary of Iberia, is founded. It will begin flight operations in March 1989.
- February 26 – After Iraqi troops are driven out of the area, Iraqi aircraft drop mustard gas on the town of Halabja in Iraqi Kurdistan. Iran responds by firing hydrogen cyanide gas into the area using artillery. The two poison gas attacks combined kill 5,000 people.
- February 27 – The Iraqi Air Force carries out a major raid against the Rey oil refinery in Tehran, badly damaging it and forcing Iran to resume rationing of petroleum products.
- February 29 – Since February 16, Iraq has conducted 13 airstrikes against urban and economic targets in Iran, while Iran has carried out five against urban or economic targets in Iraq. Neither side has launched air attacks against Persian Gulf shipping during the period.

=== March ===
- Spanair commences operations.
- March 6 – Iranian Islamic Revolutionary Guard Corps forces aboard small boats and an oil platform fire on American military helicopters performing routine reconnaissance patrols over the Persian Gulf. It is the first combat to take place in the Persian Gulf since February 12, ending one of the longest lulls in fighting in the Persian Gulf since Western forces intervened there in 1987.
- March 8
  - The Iraqi Air Force hits an Iranian ship for the first time since February 9, beginning a series of regular Iraqi attacks against shipping in the Persian Gulf. Iraq claims it has hit 23 ships in the Persian Gulf since January 1, but shipping companies confirm only nine ships damaged.
  - During a domestic flight in the Soviet Union from Kurgan to Leningrad, the Ovechkin family hijacks Aeroflot Flight 3739, a Tupolev Tu-154B (NATO reporting name "Careless") airliner, and demand that the crew fly to London so that they can escape from the Soviet Union. The crew persuades the hijackers that they must first land in Finland to refuel, but instead lands at the Soviet military airbase at Veshchevo, where a Soviet interior ministry incident response team storms the aircraft. Four hostages are killed and five hijackers commit suicide; ten surviving hijackers are arrested.
- March 15 – As both Iran and Iraq escalate their air campaigns against one another, Iraq has conducted five airstrikes against shipping in the Persian Gulf and 114 against urban and economic targets in Iran since March 1, while Iran has carried out 42 air attacks against urban or economic targets in Iraq, but none against shipping.
- March 17 – Avianca Flight 410, a Boeing 727-21, crashes near Cúcuta, Colombia, killing all 143 people on board.
- March 19 – The Iraqi Air Force conducts a major raid against Iran's Kharg Island, setting two tankers ablaze and killing 46 crewmen.
- March 31 – Since March 16, Iraq has conducted 14 airstrikes against shipping in the Persian Gulf and 94 against urban and economic targets in Iran, while Iran has carried out 15 air attacks against Persian Gulf shipping and 129 against urban or economic targets in Iraq.
- During a major Iraqi ground offensive in northern Iran, the Iraqi Air Force flies an average of 224 sorties per day, losing an average of three aircraft per day. The Islamic Republic of Iran Air Force probably loses a few of its small remaining force of operational F-5 Freedom Fighters.

=== April ===
- The Mexican government-owned airline Aeroméxico is declared bankrupt and grounded. After privatization, it will resume operations in October with a new corporate identity but still marketed as Aeroméxico.
- April 7 – The Islamic Republic of Iran Air Force stages a raid against Baghdad, inflicting little damage and apparently losing one aircraft.
- April 8 – Pacific Southwest Airlines shuts down operations and is integrated to US Air.
- April 15 – Since April 1, Iraq has conducted two airstrikes against shipping in the Persian Gulf and 38 against urban and economic targets in Iran, while Iran has carried out one air attack against Persian Gulf shipping and 85 against urban or economic targets in Iraq.
- April 17 – Iraq launches a major ground offensive to retake al-Faw from Iran, claiming that its fixed-wing aircraft and attack helicopters have flown 318 combat sorties during the day.
- April 18
  - The United States Navy conducts Operation Praying Mantis against Iranian forces and facilities in the Persian Gulf. A-6E Intruders from the aircraft carrier USS Enterprise (CVN-65) sink a speedboat, assist surface ships in sinking the frigate Sahand, and cripple the frigate Sabalan. Two Islamic Republic of Iran Air Force F-4 Phantom II fighters approach the guided-missile cruiser USS Wainwright (CG-28), which damages one of them with a surface-to-air missile.
  - Al-Faw falls to Iraqi forces, and Iran makes an unfounded claim that American attack helicopters have supported the Iraqi offensive.
- April 23 – Kanellos Kanellopoulos recreates the mythical flight of Daedalus by flying a pedal-powered aircraft, the MIT Daedalus, from Crete to Santorini, covering the 119 km (74 mi) in 3 hours 54 minutes.
- April 28 – Aloha Airlines Flight 243 suffers an explosive decompression in flight over the Hawaiian Islands, with the roof blowing off the Boeing 737-200 from the cockpit to just in front of the wings. All 90 passengers and four of the five crew survive; one flight attendant is swept out of the plane and falls to her death.
- April 30 – Since April 16, Iraq has conducted two airstrikes against shipping in the Persian Gulf and seven against urban and economic targets in Iran, while Iran has carried out five air attacks against Persian Gulf shipping and 58 against urban or economic targets in Iraq.

=== May ===
- May 6 – Widerøe Flight 710, a de Havilland Canada Dash 7, descends too quickly on approach in heavy fog to Brønnøysund Airport in Brønnøy Municipality, Norway, and crashes into the mountain Torghatten, killing all 36 people on board. It remains the deadliest accident involving a Dash 7.
- May 8 – The world's smallest airplane, the Starr Bumble Bee II, makes its first flight and sets a world record (for the smallest piloted plane. The plane is piloted by its builder, Robert H. Starr (age 64). It crashes the same day due to engine failure, seriously injuring Starr.
- May 10 – Airbus A300s are delivered to American Airlines and enter service with the airline.
- May 14; An Iraqi airforce jet fires missiles at an oil tanker, the Jahre Viking ( at the time the biggest tanker in the world ). The ship is on fire and sinks, but it is refloated repaired and used for some more years.
- May 15 – Since May 1, Iraq has conducted 12 airstrikes against shipping in the Persian Gulf and two against urban and economic targets in Iran, while Iran has carried out no airstrikes.
- May 23 – Shamu One, a Southwest Airlines Boeing 737-300 painted like and named after a SeaWorld killer whale, begins flying for the airline.
- May 24 – British Airways takes over British Caledonian.
- May 24 – Descending to land at Moisant Field in New Orleans, Louisiana, TACA Flight 110, a Boeing 737-3T0, encounters heavy rain, hail, and turbulence which cause both of its engines to lose power. The pilots make a deadstick landing on a wide grass levee at the National Aeronautics and Space Administration's Michoud Assembly Facility in the Michoud area of eastern New Orleans. There are no fatalities, and only seven of the 45 people on board suffer injuries, all minor.
- May 25 – The Iraqi Air Force strikes the power station at Neka, Iran.
- May 29 – Saudi Arabian investor and businessman Salem bin Laden, a half-brother and cousin of future al-Qaeda leader Osama bin Laden, dies when the Spirit ultralight aircraft he is piloting near San Antonio, Texas, strikes overhead power lines and falls 115 feet (35 meters) to the ground.
- May 30 – The first aircraft carrier to be built in Spain, Principe de Asturias, is commissioned into the Spanish Navy.
- May 31 – Since May 16, Iraq has conducted two airstrikes against shipping in the Persian Gulf and two against urban and economic targets in Iran, while Iran has carried out five air attacks against Persian Gulf shipping, but none against urban or economic targets in Iraq.

=== June ===
- June 6 – Ascending from Plano, Texas, Swedish aviator Per Lindstrand sets a new world altitude record for hot-air balloons, reaching 19,811 meters (64,997 feet). The record will stand until 26 November 2005.
- June 8 – Operating in the Persian Gulf, the United States Navy guided-missile frigate USS Halyburton (FFG-40) orders an airliner operating as British Airways Flight 147 to turn away or risk being fired upon, the airliner comes into a near-miss situation with another airliner, prompting the Dubai air traffic control center to lodge a formal protest.
- June 15 – Since June 1, Iraq has conducted three airstrikes against shipping in the Persian Gulf, but nine against urban and economic targets in Iran, while Iran has carried out no air attacks.
- June 17 – The prototype ATR 42-200 crashed shortly after lift off from Toulouse–Blagnac Airport while performing an engine failure test. All three crew members survived but the aircraft was written off.
- June 18 – The People's Mojahedin Organization of Iran ground forces launch an offensive, recapturing the city of Mehran, Iran. The goal was to occupy the Iranian border city of Mehran to control its oil fields, as well as Kurdish villages in the region.
- June 23 – The Iraqi Air Force launches its heaviest attack against urban and economic targets in Iran in two months, setting six crude oil production units in Ahwaz, two oil pumping stations in Bibi Hakemeh, and two oil installations at Kaj Saran ablaze.
- June 25 – Iraqi ground forces launch a major ground offensive against Iranian forces around Majnoon and behind the Majnoon Islands. Iraqi Air Force jets and Iraqi attack helicopters apparently fly over 40 sorties in support of the offensive. The Islamic Republic of Iran Air Force commits 35 aircraft to countering the Iraqi offensive and suffers heavy losses.
- June 26 – The first crash of an Airbus A320 occurs when Air France Flight 296, an Airbus A320-111 carrying 130 passengers and a crew of six, makes a low-altitude, low-speed flyby with landing gear down as part of an air show at Mulhouse-Habsheim Airport in France, strikes trees beyond the runway, and crashes. Three passengers die and 50 people on board are injured.
- June 30 – The Iraqi Air Force strikes an Iranian natural gas facility and an Iranian offshore oil platform. Since June 16, Iraq has conducted 13 airstrikes against urban and economic targets in Iran, while Iran has carried out one against urban and economic targets in Iraq. Neither country had launched air raids against shipping in the Persian Gulf.

=== July ===
- July 1 – The Government of Australia creates the Civil Aviation Authority to control aviation safety regulation and provide air traffic control services in Australia.
- July 3 – After an Iranian Revolutionary Guard Corps Navy speedboat fires on her LAMPS Mark III helicopter while it observes the activities of Iranian gunboats and speedboats in the Persian Gulf, the United States Navy guided-missile cruiser USS Vincennes (CG-49) engages the Iranian craft with gunfire. Shortly thereafter, Vincennes shoots down Iran Air Flight 655, an Airbus A300B2-203 airliner flying from Bandar Abbas International Airport in Bandar Abbas, Iran, to Dubai International Airport in Dubai in the United Arab Emirates, killing all 290 people on board. The United States Government maintains that the cruiser's crew believed the airliner was a threatening Islamic Republic of Iran Air Force F-14 Tomcat and blames the airliner's crew for failing to monitor warning frequencies and Iranian air traffic control for routing the aircraft at too low an altitude over a known area of hostilities; the Government of Iran argues that the ship's crew knew that the aircraft was an airliner and shot it down deliberately and unlawfully.
- July 12 – Two United States Army helicopters exchange fire with two Iranian gunboats in the Persian Gulf east of Farsi Island, forcing the Iranian vessels to break off their attack on the tanker Universal Monarch.
- July 13 – A British International Helicopters Sikorsky S-61N helicopter ditches in the North Sea northeast of Sumburgh Airport, Shetland, Scotland, without injury to any of the 21 people on board.
- July 14 – Sichuan Airlines begins flight operations. Its first route is between Chengdu and Wanzhou, China.
- July 15 – Since July 1, Iraq has conducted five airstrikes against shipping in the Persian Gulf and three against urban and economic targets in Iran, while Iran has carried out five air attacks against Persian Gulf shipping, but none against urban or economic targets in Iraq.
- July 25 – The Portuguese regional airline Portugália is established. It will begin flight operations in July 1990.
- July 31 – Since July 16, Iraq has conducted four airstrikes against urban and economic targets in Iran, but Iran has carried out no air attacks against urban or economic targets in Iraq. Neither country has launched air attacks against Persian Gulf shipping during the period.

=== August ===
- August 17 – During its initial climb after takeoff from Bahawalpur Airport in Bahawalpur, Pakistan, a Pakistan Air Force Lockheed C-130B Hercules carrying President of Pakistan Muhammad Zia-ul-Haq crashes 7 kilometers (4.3 miles) north of the airport, killing all 30 people on board. In addition to Zia, the dead include the chairman of Pakistan's Joint Chiefs of Staff Committee, General Akhtar Abdur Rahman, Brigadier Siddique Salik, United States Ambassador to Pakistan Arnold Lewis Raphel, and the head of the United States military aid mission to Pakistan, General Herbert M. Wassom.
- August 20
  - Since August 1, Iraq has conducted five airstrikes against urban and economic targets in Iran, but has not attacked Persian Gulf shipping, while Iran has carried out one air attack against Persian Gulf shipping but has not launched air attacks against urban or economic targets in Iraq.
  - A ceasefire officially brings the seven-year-eleven-month-long Iran–Iraq War to an end, although Iran and Iraq had formally announced an end to all fighting on August 8.
- August 28 – The Ramstein airshow disaster takes place during a performance by the Italian Air Force Frecce Tricolori aerobatic demonstration team at Ramstein Air Base in West Germany when three Aermacchi MB-339 PAN aircraft collide, killing all three pilots and 67 spectators on the ground and injuring 346 people. It is the worst air show accident in history.
- August 31 – Delta Air Lines Flight 1141, a Boeing 727, crashes on takeoff from Dallas/Fort Worth International Airport in Euless, Texas, killing 14 and injuring 76 of the 108 people on board.

=== September ===
- September 7 – Trans World Airlines stockholders approve majority owner Carl Icahn's proposal to take the company private. The transaction earns $610.3 million for the stockholders – of which $469 million goes to Icahn – and adds $539.7 million to the airline's debt.
- September 10 – Islamic Republic of Iran Air Force aircraft bomb the Iraqi nuclear reactor at Tuwaitha.
- September 15 – Ethiopian Airlines Flight 604, a Boeing 737-260, strikes a flock of speckled pigeons during takeoff from Bahir Dar Airport at Bahir Dar, Ethiopia. Both of its engines ingest birds and lose thrust as the aircraft returns to the airport, and the plane catches fire during a belly landing. Thirty-five of the 104 people on board die.
- September 30 – American race car driver Al Holbert is fatally injured when the Piper PA-60-601P Aerostar he is piloting crashes near Columbus, Ohio, just after takeoff because its clamshell door is not closed.

=== October ===
- October 1 – The privately owned airline Aerovias de Mexico SA de CV begins flight operations, using the remaining assets of its predecessor, the Mexican government-owned Aeroméxico, which had ceased operations in April due to bankruptcy. The new airline also operates as Aeroméxico.
- October 5 – Donald Trump makes arrangements to purchase the Eastern Air Lines Shuttle. The deal will be completed in June 1989.
- October 12 – A Bar Harbor Airlines ATR 42 loses the required separation between it and Air Force One while both are descending to land at Newark International Airport. The minimum distance between the two aircraft was 500 feet (150 meters) vertically and 1.58 miles (2.54 kilometers) horizontally.
- October 17 – Uganda Airlines Flight 775, a Boeing 707-338C, crashed while trying to land at Rome Fiumicino Airport, Rome, Italy. Out of the 52 occupants on board, 19 survive.
- October 19 – Indian Airlines Flight 113, a Boeing 737-2A8, strikes trees and a high-tension pylon while on approach in fog to Sardar Vallabhbhai Patel International Airport in Ahmedabad, Gujarat, India, and crashes, killing 130 of the 135 people on board and leaving all five survivors injured.

=== November ===
- November 2 – LOT Flight 703, an Antonov An-24W, crash-lands at Białobrzegi, Poland, when its engines shut down due to atmospheric icing while the aircraft is on approach to Rzeszów-Jasionka Airport. One person is killed in the crash, but the other 28 people on board evacuate quickly, escaping before the plane bursts into flame; among the survivors is Polish radio presenter Tomasz Beksiński. As a result of the crash, LOT Polish Airlines replaces all of its An-24s with ATR 42 and ATR 72 aircraft.
- November 10 – The United States Air Force publicly unveils the Lockheed F-117A Nighthawk stealth fighter. It had been operational secretly since 1983.
- November 18 – Malév Hungarian Airlines begins phasing out its Soviet-era planes with the introduction of its first Western-designed aircraft, a Boeing 737-200. It is the first airline in a Communist Eastern European country to acquire a Western-built aircraft.

=== December ===
- Flying Tiger Line is sold to Federal Express. It will complete its merger with Federal Express in August 1989.
- December 8 – A United States Air Force A-10 Thunderbolt II on a low-level flying exercise crashes into the upper floor of an apartment complex in a residential area of Remscheid, West Germany, killing the pilot and five people on the ground and injuring 50 others.
- December 16 – A Learjet 24B flying from Memphis International Airport in Memphis, Tennessee, to Addison, Texas, overshoots its destination. After air traffic controllers fail to contact its two-person crew – one of them National Aeronautics and Space Administration (NASA) astronaut candidate Susan Reynolds – a United States Air Force T-38 Talon intercepts it and finds it flying with frost apparently inside its cockpit windows, but also cannot communicate with its crew. The Learjet flies into Mexico and crashes near Cuatro Ciénegas in Coahuila, Mexico, after it runs out of fuel, killing both crew members.
- December 21 – Pan Am Flight 103, a Boeing 747 flying from London to New York City, and carrying many American passengers home for Christmas, explodes over Lockerbie, Scotland, killing all 259 on board and eleven on the ground. English rock musician Paul Jeffreys and his new wife, flying to their honeymoon, are among the dead. Libyan terrorists are blamed for the tragedy.
- December 31 – In a pilot error incident at Odessa Airport, an Aeroflot Tupolev Tu-134A (NATO reporting name "Crusty") achieves the highest landing speed for an aircraft, at 415 kilometres per hour (258 mph).

== First flights ==
=== February ===
- February 11 – Cirrus VK-30
- February 19 – Boeing 737-400
- February 22 – IRGC Fajr

=== March ===
- March 18 – Akaflieg Braunschweig SB-13 Arcus

=== April ===
- April 16 – McDonnell Douglas T-45 Goshawk
- April 21 – Boeing 747-400
- April 29 – Grob G 116

=== May ===
- May 6 – Extra EA-300
- May 8 – Starr Bumble Bee II

=== June ===
- June 14 – Schweizer 330 N330TT
- June 28 – Sukhoi Su-27M (NATO reporting name "Flanker-E")

=== July ===
- July 12 – Scaled Composites/Beechcraft Model 143 Triumph N143SC, also first flight of the Williams International FJ44 turbofan engine.
- July 14 – Socata TBM700 F-WTBM
- July 19 – LoPresti Fury
- July 24 – Stoddard-Hamilton T-9 Stalker

=== August ===
- August 15 – SZD-55 sailplane.
- August 25 – FFV Aerotech BA-14 Starling.
- August 28 – Hoffmann H-40 D-EIOF.

=== September ===
- September 28 – Ilyushin Il-96

=== October ===
- October 15 – MBB Bo 108 D-HBOX.
- October 27 – ATR 72 F-WWEY.

=== December ===
- December 9 – JAS 39 Gripen.
- December 12 – CMC Leopard G-BKRL.
- December 21 – Antonov An-225 Mriya
- December 28 – Let L-610 OK-130.

== Entered service ==
April

- April 29 – Airbus A320 with British Airways

May

- May 9 – British Aerospace ATP with British Midland

== Deadliest crash ==
The deadliest crash of this year was Iran Air Flight 655, an Airbus A300 which was shot down over the Strait of Hormuz on 3 July, killing all 290 people on board. Later that year, a terrorist bomb exploded aboard Pan Am Flight 103, a Boeing 747 which then crashed into Lockerbie, Scotland on 21 December, killing all 259 people on board as well as 11 on the ground; this disaster may have been aided by Iran in reaction to the shootdown of Flight 655 not six months earlier.
