= Air France Asie =

Airline of France and Taiwan (1994–2007)

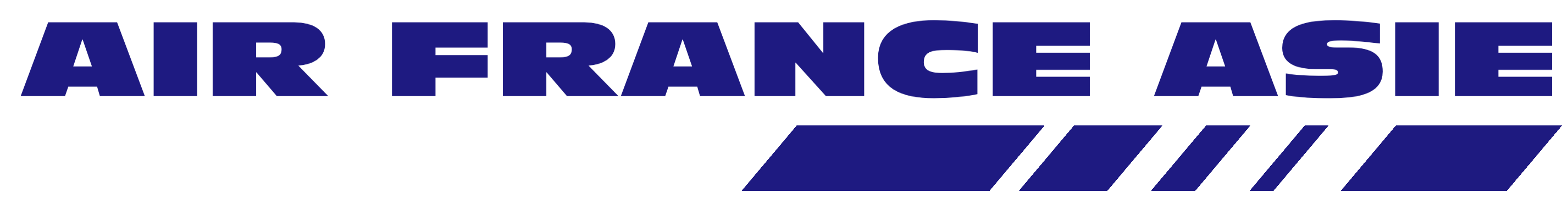

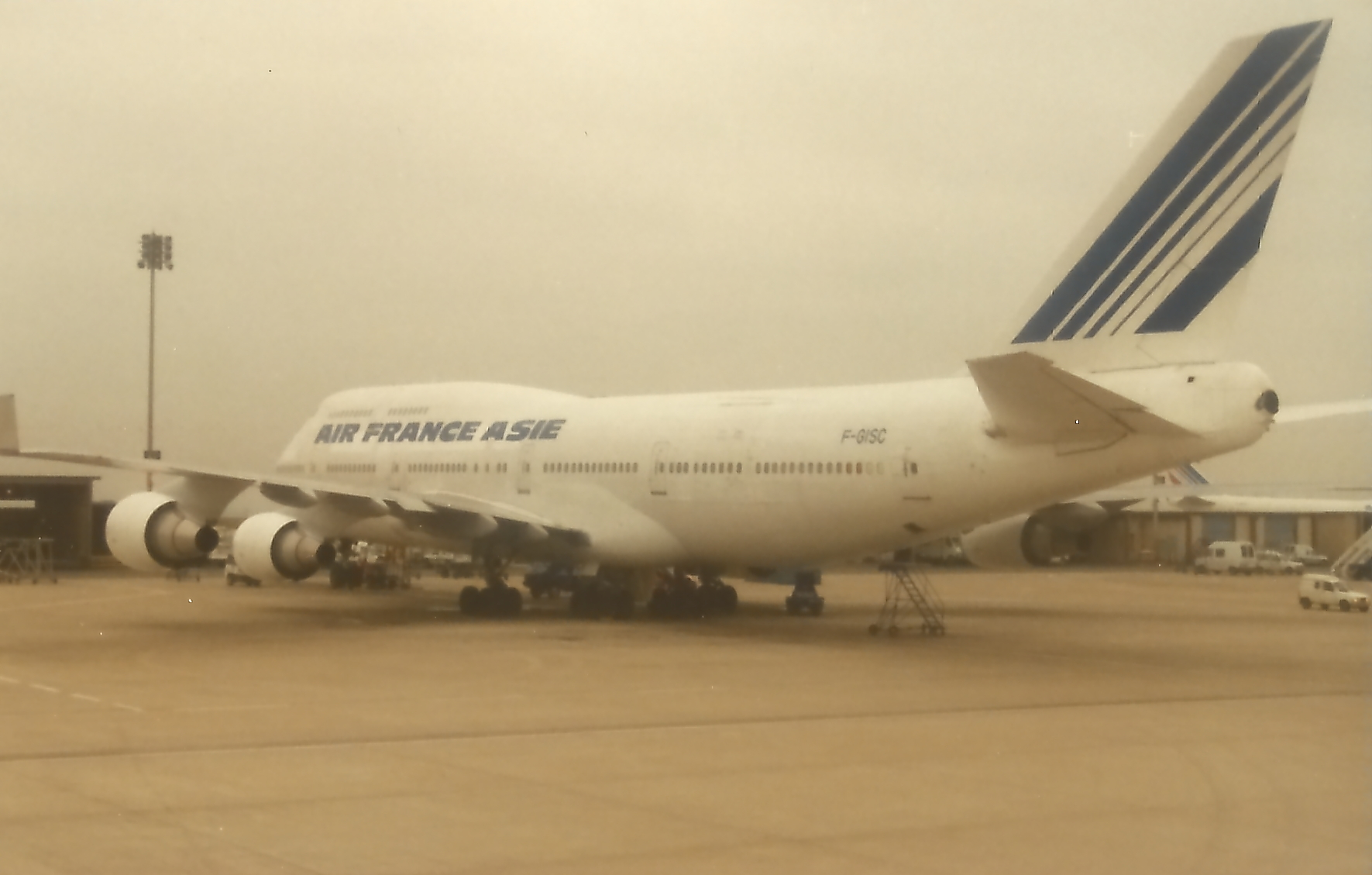
- Boeing 747-400M
IATA	ICAO	Call sign
AF	AFR	AIRFRANS
- Founded: 1994
- Ceased operations: 27 March 2004 (passenger); 2007 (Air France Cargo Asie)
- Focus cities: Hong Kong–Kai Tak (1994–1998); Hong Kong–Chek Lap Kok (1998–2007); Paris–Charles de Gaulle; Taipei–Taoyuan
- Frequent-flyer program: Fréquence Plus (1994–2003); Flying Blue (2003–2004)
- Alliance: SkyTeam (affiliate; 2000–2004); SkyTeam Cargo (affiliate; 2000–2007)
- Subsidiaries: Air France Cargo Asie
- Fleet size: 8 (including Air France Cargo Asie)
- Parent company: Air France

Air France Asie was a subsidiary of Air France established because the political status of Taiwan of the Republic of China (Taiwan) and its territory disputes with the People's Republic of China to allow Air France to continue flying from France to Taiwan. It became the main carrier operating from France to Taipei after Air Charter (an Air France subsidiary) stopped flying in 1998.

== History ==
=== Main period (1994–2004) ===
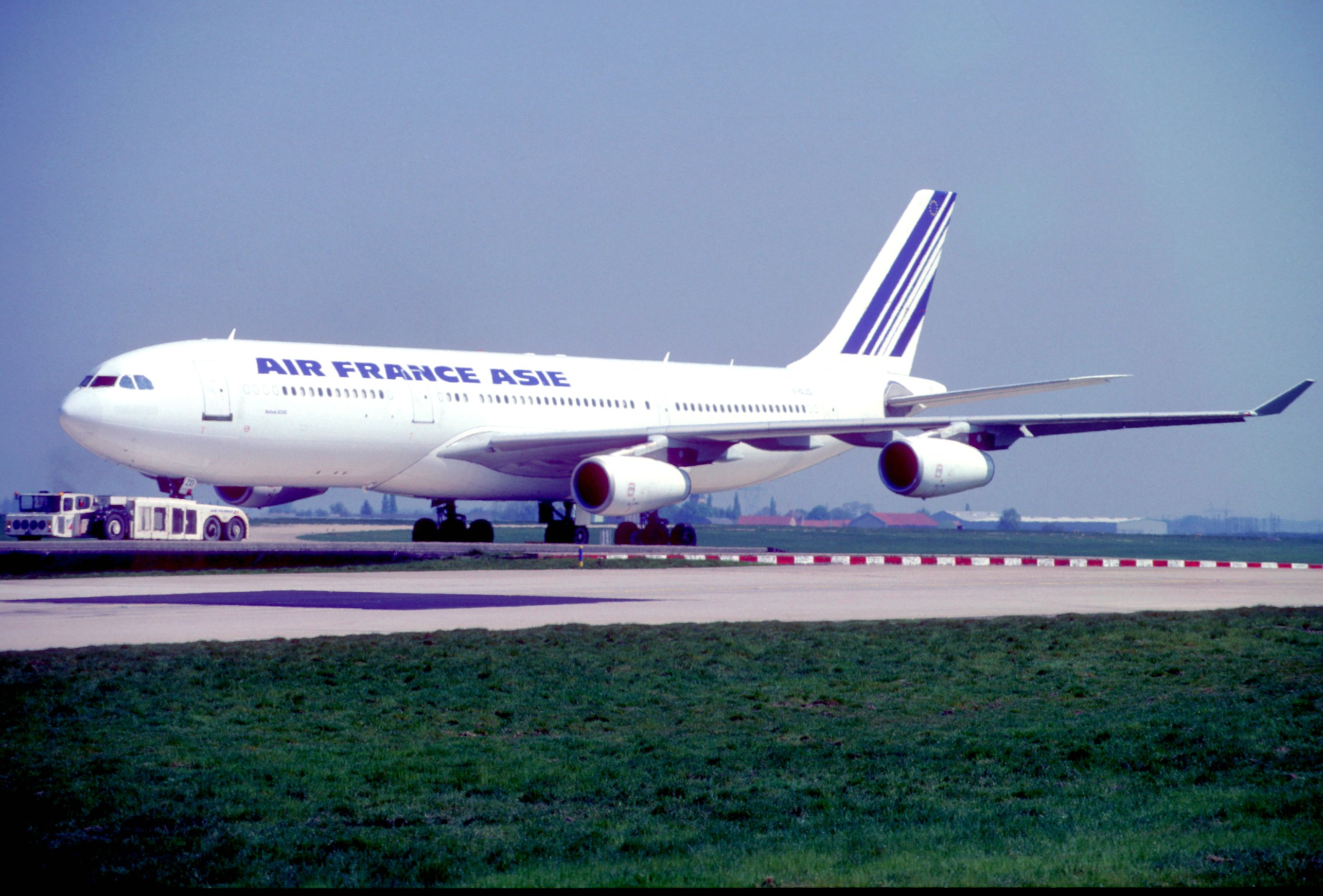
Airbus A340-200 in the Asie livery, the usual red strip part of the French tricolour is replaced by a blue strip, the same colour as the other blue lines.

Owing to the Taiwan (also known as Republic of China) disputed status, Air France could not operate flights to the island under its own name. In 1993, its subsidiary Air Charter, began operating flights between Paris and Taipei via Hong Kong. In early 1994 Air France Asie started a route from Paris Charles de Gaulle Airport to Taipei, often stopping in Hong Kong's Kai Tak Airport (until it closed on 6 July 1998). It also operated flights from Paris to Osaka via Hong Kong. Operations debuted with 747-400Ms, and later with Airbus A340-200s, both types made available by Air France.

In March 2004, due to the merger of KLM that year, Air France Asie stopped passenger services focusing on freight. Air France did not resume own passenger services with Boeing 777-300ER to Taipei until April 2018; by then, services were operated by Air France under its own name.

=== Freight service (2004–2007) ===
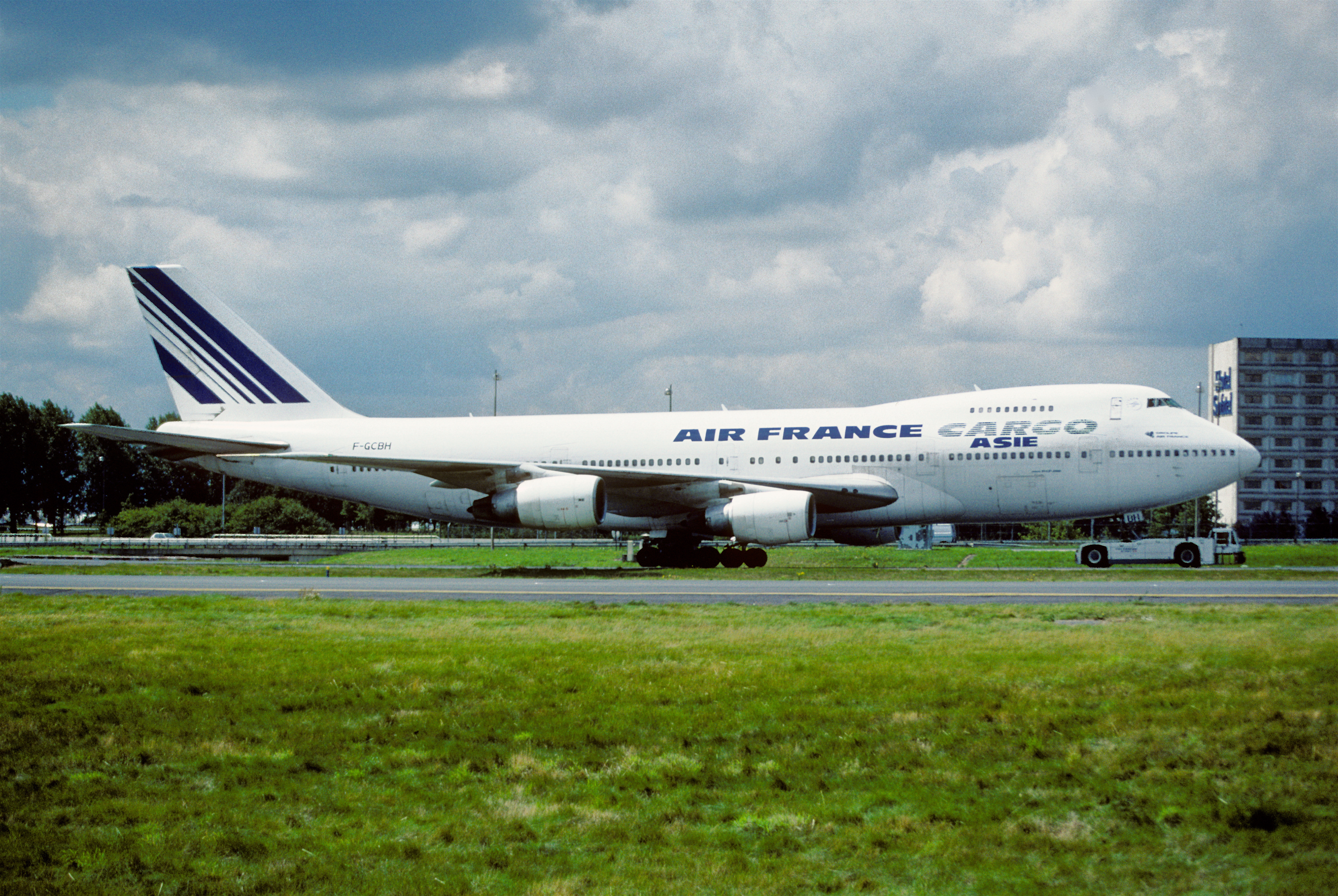
Boeing 747-200B

After passenger services stopped in 2004, the remaining fleet of Boeing 747-200Fs continued flying freight between Paris and Taipei although it was halted in 2007 possibly due to the changed relations between People's Republic of China, France and Taiwan.

== Destinations ==
=== Asia ===
- (Hong Kong) /Hong Kong
  - Kai Tak Airport (Focus city; 1994–1998)
  - Chek Lap Kok Airport (Focus city; 1998–2007)
- Japan
  - Osaka – Itami Airport (before the opening of Kansai Airport in 1994; never operated at Kansai)
- Republic of China (Taiwan)
  - Taipei – Chiang Kai-shek International Airport (Focus city)

=== Europe ===
- France
  - Paris – Charles de Gaulle Airport (Focus city)

== Fleet and livery ==
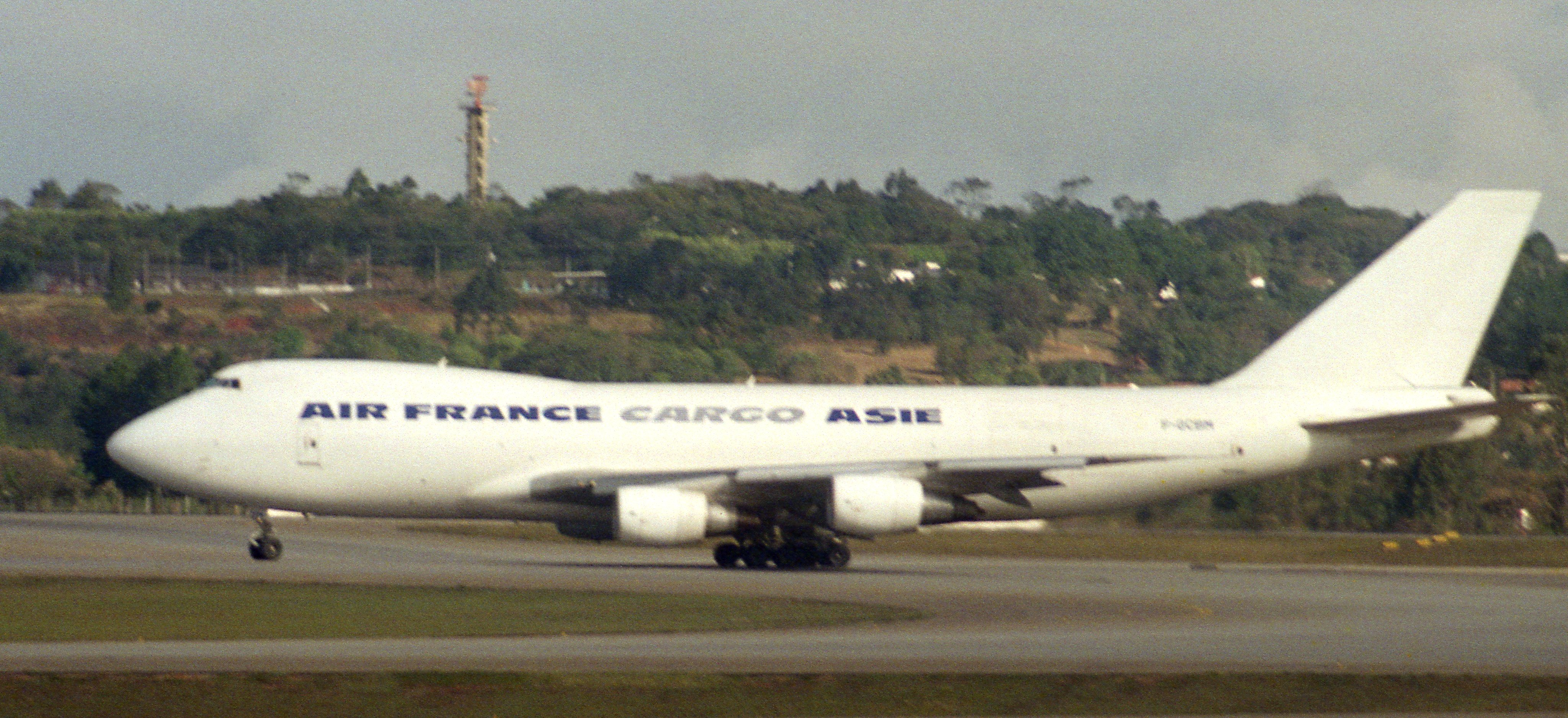
Boeing 747-200F

The livery of Air France Asie differed from that of Air France by having blue and white stripes on the tailfin, rather than blue, white and red ones, representing the French Tricolour. Air France Asie used two Airbus A340-200 aircraft, F-GLZD and F-GLZE, as well as two Combi (for passengers and freight) Boeing 747-428Ms, F-GISA and F-GISC. Similarly, Air France Cargo Asie used a 747-200 Combi, F-GCBH, or the all-cargo (F-GCBL, F-GPAN and F-GBOX).

Aircraft	Total	Introduced	Retired	Replacement	Notes
Airbus A340-200	2	1994	1997	None	F-GLZD was later transferred to Air Tahiti Nui.
Boeing 747-200B	1	1995	2003	None	
Boeing 747-200F	3	1994	2006	None	F-GPAN crashed in March 1999.
Boeing 747-400M	2	1994	1995	Airbus A340-200	F-GISA was later converted into a cargo aircraft.
