= Mohamed Amin =

Kenyan photojournalist (1943–1996)

Mohamed "Mo" Amin MBE
- Born: 29 August 1943; Eastleigh, Nairobi, Kenya Colony
- Died: 23 November 1996 (aged 53); Indian Ocean near Grande Comore, Comoros
- Occupation: Photojournalist

Mohamed Amin MBE (29 August 1943 – 23 November 1996) was a Kenyan photojournalist.

Amin's filming of Michael Buerk's report of the 1984 Ethiopian famine brought international attention to the crisis and eventually helped start the charity wave that resulted in Live Aid concerts.

Amin died in November 1996 when his flight Ethiopian Airlines Flight 961 was hijacked and crashed into the Indian Ocean near Grande Comore.

== Life and work ==
Amin was born on 29 August 1943 in Eastleigh, Nairobi, to a family of Punjab descent. He developed an interest in photography at school.

He founded the Camerapix company in 1963 in Dar es Salaam and moved the company to Nairobi three years later. During the 1970s, he became one of the most relied-upon African news photographers, reporting on wars and coups all through the continent, and his pictures were often used by Western news media. Amin's most influential moment came when his filming, along with Michael Buerk's reporting of the 1984 Ethiopian famine brought international attention to the crisis and eventually helped start the charity wave that resulted in Live Aid concerts.

Apart from Ethiopian famine, he contributed exclusive photos of the fall of Idi Amin and of Mengistu Haile Mariam, and was author of numerous books, including Journey Through Pakistan, Pilgrimage to Mecca, and covered various themes like East African Wildlife and the Uganda Railway. Amin also published issues of Selamta, the Ethiopian Airlines in-flight magazine.

Amin was not only active in Africa, but also in the Middle East. He covered the Palestinian Black September uprising to seize control of Jordan in September 1970. He was able to move among the Palestinian forces where Western journalists could not.

In 1991, Amin lost his left arm during an ammunition dump explosion in Ethiopia during the Ethiopian Civil War.

== Death ==
Amin boarded Ethiopian Airlines Flight 961 on 23 November 1996, with 61-year-old Briton Brian Tetley, a colleague who wrote the text for Amin's photography books, to travel to Nairobi after a business trip to Ethiopia. Hijackers stormed the cockpit of ET-AIZ, the Ethiopian Airlines Boeing B767-260ER used for the flight, and forced the pilot, Leul Abate, to fly east over the Indian Ocean to Australia. Amin attempted to rally the passengers to attack the hijackers and confronted the hijackers, trying to stop the scenario. ET-AIZ ran out of fuel and Abate ditched the aircraft off the coast of the Comoros Islands. ET-AIZ broke into pieces, and as Amin was standing, his body hit the airplane wall causing his death. He was 53. Tetley also did not survive the crash.

== Legacy ==
In June 2006, Mo & Me, an Al Jazeera documentary film about Amin was premiered. It won Best International Documentary at the Los Angeles International Film Festival. Al Jazeera and Camerapix funded the film.

Amin's son, Salim Amin, runs the Camerapix company as of 2008. Mo Amin is the inspiration for the A24 news channel, a proposed independent pan-African 24-hour 'African voice for Africa' which commenced broadcasting from Nairobi on 19 September 2008.

Mohamed Amin worked with numerous journalists and writers, including Tahir Shah and Colin Blane, as well as Michael Buerk.
