= Lebanese Civil Aviation Authority =

Coordinates: 33°49′16″N 35°29′18″E

Agency overview
- Jurisdiction: Lebanon
- Headquarters: Rafic Hariri International Airport, Beirut
- Website: www.dgca.gov.lb

The Lebanese Civil Aviation Authority (LCAA) is the civil aviation authority of Lebanon. It is a directorate associated to the Ministry of Public Works and Transport (MPWT), which is governed by the Regulatory Decree number 1610 dated 26 July 1971.

== See also ==
- Ethiopian Airlines Flight 409
