= A24 news channel =

Pan-African 24-hour station

Africa 24 Media
- Broadcast area: Worldwide
- Headquarters: Nairobi, Kenya

Programming
- Picture format: 4:3 (576i, SDTV)

Ownership
- Owner: A24 Media Limited

History
- Launched: 2008-09-01

Links
- Website: www.a24media.com

A24 is an independent pan-African production studio, an 'African voice for Africa', based in Nairobi, Kenya. It started operations on 13 May 2008.

== Overview ==
The project is the brainchild of Salim Amin and Asif Sheikh, Salim is a Kenyan photojournalist and entrepreneur based in Nairobi who runs Camerapix, the media business started by his late father Mohammed 'Mo' Amin.

The channel's model for development is the Al Jazeera network in Qatar. As well as providing news, A24's mission is to communicate relevant information about cross-border issues especially health care, the environment, business, art, and music, without shirking from addressing the continent's problems. Salim Amin wrote in an article: "We are different in each corner of Africa; we have different histories, cultures and many different languages. But we need to talk to each other, we need to understand all these differences, we need to share our successes, and jointly fight our problems and failures - many of which are similar - HIV, malaria, corruption, poverty, human rights and education."

== Programming ==
=== Series ===
- God in Africa
- Family Doctor
- CrossTalk
- Witness (licensed from Al-Jazeera English)
- Shake
- Kuwa Tofauti
- Hatua
- Doctors on Call
- Nigeria This Week
- Kaleidoscope
- Business 2010
- Business in Africa
- East Africa Report
- Africa's Entrepreneurs
- Healthy Business
- Initiavtive Africa (produced by People TV)
- Business Africa (produced by People TV)
