= Ethiopian Airlines Flight 409 =

2010 aviation accident in the Mediterranean Sea

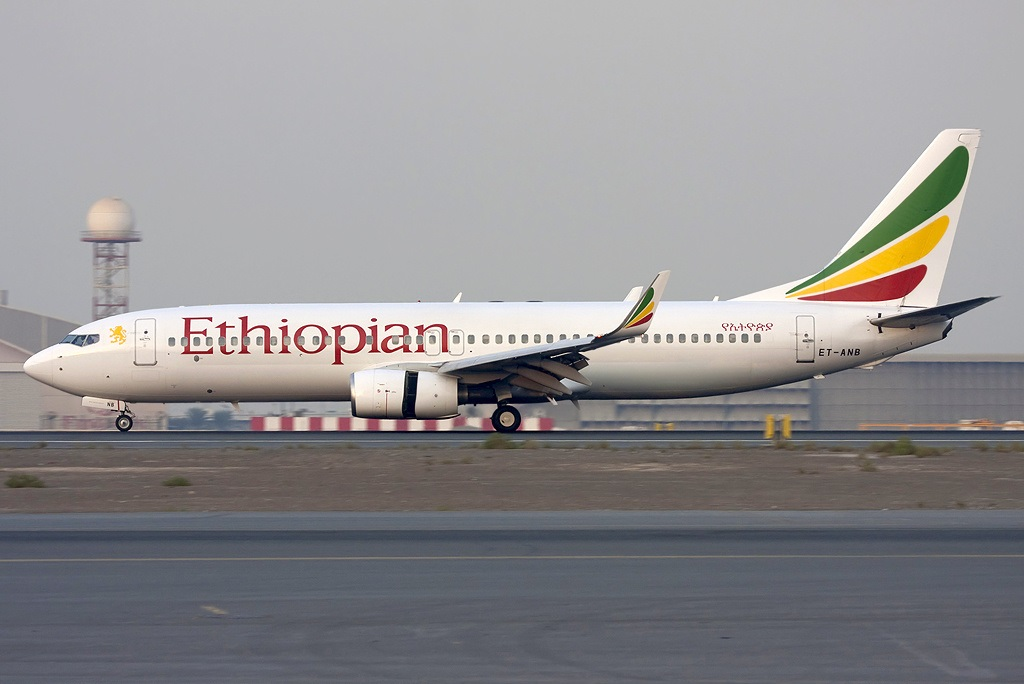
- ET-ANB, the aircraft involved in the accident, seen in 2009

Accident
- Date: 25 January 2010
- Summary: Loss of control in flight
- Site: Mediterranean Sea, 11 km (6.8 mi; 5.9 nmi) off Beirut–Rafic Hariri International Airport, Beirut, Lebanon; 33°45′28″N 35°25′49″E

Aircraft
- Aircraft type: Boeing 737-8AS
- Operator: Ethiopian Airlines
- IATA flight No.: ET409
- ICAO flight No.: ETH409
- Call sign: ETHIOPIAN 409
- Registration: ET-ANB
- Flight origin: Beirut–Rafic Hariri International Airport, Lebanon
- Destination: Bole International Airport, Addis Ababa, Ethiopia
- Occupants: 90
- Passengers: 82
- Crew: 8
- Fatalities: 90
- Survivors: 0

Ethiopian Airlines Flight 409 was an international commercial flight scheduled from Beirut to Addis Ababa of a Boeing 737-800 that crashed into the Mediterranean Sea shortly after takeoff from Rafic Hariri International Airport on 25 January 2010, killing all 90 people on board. This was the first fatal crash for Ethiopian Airlines since the hijacking of Ethiopian Airlines Flight 961 in 1996.

== Background ==
=== Aircraft ===
The aircraft involved was a Boeing 737-8AS, registration ET-ANB, s/n 29935. It first flew on 18 January 2002, and was delivered new to Ryanair on 4 February 2002 as EI-CSW. Stored in April 2009, Ethiopian Airlines took delivery of the aircraft on 12 September 2009, leased from CIT Group. Provided with twin CFM International CFM56-7B26 powerplants, the airframe last underwent maintenance checks on 25 December 2009 without any technical problems found. It was 8 years and 7 days old at the time the accident took place.

=== Crew ===
In command was 44-year-old Captain Habtamu Benti Negasa, who had been with Ethiopian Airlines since 1989. He was one of the airline's most experienced pilots, having logged 10,233 flight hours, including 2,488 hours on the Boeing 737. The first officer was 23-year-old Aluna Tamerat Beyene. He was far less experienced than the captain, having worked for Ethiopian Airlines for only a year and having 673 flight hours, 350 of them on the Boeing 737.

== Accident ==
The Boeing 737 took off from runway 21 at Beirut–Rafic Hariri International Airport in stormy weather, with 82 passengers and eight crew members on board. The METAR data indicated wind speeds of 8 knots (15 km/h; 9 mph) from varying directions, with thunderstorms in the vicinity of the airport. The aircraft climbed erratically to 9,000 feet (2,700 m), stalled and entered a spiral dive to the left. Radar contact was lost a few seconds before it crashed into the Mediterranean Sea at 02:41 local time (UTC +2/EET), four or five minutes after take off. Witnesses near the coast reported seeing the aircraft on fire as it crashed into the sea.

== Search and recovery ==
On the morning following the accident, Lebanese authorities reported locating the accident site 3.5 kilometres (2.2 mi; 1.9 nmi) off the coast from the village of Na'ameh, in 45 metres (148 ft) of water. The search for survivors was carried out by the Lebanese Army, using Sikorsky S-61 helicopters, the Lebanese Navy and UNIFIL troops. The US military, in response to a request from the Lebanese government, sent the guided missile destroyer USS Ramage, a Navy Lockheed P-3 Orion aircraft, and the salvage ship USNS Grapple. The French Navy sent a Breguet Atlantic reconnaissance aircraft. UNIFIL sent three ships (among them the German minesweeper tender Mosel and the Turkish corvette Bozcaada) and two helicopters to the scene. Further helicopters were sent by the Royal Air Force, and the Cyprus Police Aviation Unit.

On 7 February, Lebanese Army divers recovered the plane's flight data recorder and cockpit voice recorder (CVR). The CVR was missing a memory storage unit when found. This was reported on 16 February as having been recovered. All were sent to the French Bureau of Enquiry and Analysis for Civil Aviation Safety (BEA) for analysis.

All the deceased were recovered from the sea by 23 February. The recovered bodies were sent to the Rafik Hariri University Hospital in Beirut for DNA testing and identification. They were all identified by the end of February.

== Investigation ==
The Lebanese Civil Aviation Authority (LCAA) investigated the accident, with the assistance of the BEA, Boeing, and the National Transportation Safety Board (NTSB) of the United States.

Lebanese President Michel Suleiman stated before the flight data recorders were found that the accident was not due to terrorism. Lebanese Information Minister Tarek Mitri rejected the notion that the aircraft should not have been allowed to take off under the current weather conditions, stating that "many" other aircraft had taken off during the time period.

== Final report ==
The final investigation report was created by the Lebanese Civil Aviation Authority (LCAA), part of the Lebanese Ministry of Public Works and Transport, and presented on 17 January 2012.

=== Possible fire on board ===
It noted that eyewitnesses, including an air traffic controller, and a crew flying in the vicinity of Flight 409, had reported seeing an "orange light", "an orange explosion", or "a ball of fire" which matched "the time and calculated location of the accident". The LCAA speculates, in their report, that impressions of explosions or fire may have been caused by the aircraft lights during the steep dive or by "thunderstorm activities in the area", as "no sign of any explosion or fire were detected on the wreckage" or "during the autopsies carried on some of the bodies".

==== Black soot ====
On the wreckage "a black soot near the APU exhaust" was found with "some wrinkle on the metal". A laboratory examination by the NTSB "confirmed that the black soot was not related to excessive heat or fire", because "Zinc chromate primer paint changes color when exposed to heat" and "there was no change in the color of the paint on the primer side". The spectrum analysis suggests that the black soot "was organic" and it "most closely matched spectra from lubricating oils".

=== Cause ===
The report concluded that "the probable causes of the accident were the flight crew's mismanagement of the aircraft's speed, altitude, headings, and attitude through inconsistent flight control inputs resulting in a loss of control and their failure to abide by CRM (Crew Resource Management) principles of mutual support and calling deviations".

==== Contributing factors ====
The report also listed a number of contributing factors:

- The manipulation of the flight controls by the flight crew in an ineffective manner resulted in the aircraft's undesired behaviour and increased the level of stress of the pilots.
- The aircraft being out of trim for most of the flight directly increased the workload on the pilot and made his control of the aircraft more demanding.
- The prevailing weather conditions at night most probably resulted in spatial disorientation to the flight crew and led to loss of situational awareness.
- The consecutive flying on a new type with the absolute minimum rest could have likely resulted in a chronic fatigue affecting the captain's performance. (Note: It is also mentioned that the heavy meal discussed by the crew prior to take-off has affected their quality of sleep prior to that flight.)
- The first officer's reluctance to intervene did not help in confirming a case of captain's subtle incapacitation (Note: The report stated that "subtle incapacitation is about a slow degradation of performance in a crew member. It is more dangerous when it occurs to the captain, due to the cockpit authority gradient. The pilot would look and sound as if he was conscious; however, his performance would have degraded.", and "Such incapacitation have been identified by experts as being the result of sleep loss, fatigue, emotional stress, blood chemistry imbalances, or as a result of some drugs or alcohol.") and/or to take over control of the aircraft as stipulated in the operators SOP.

== Response by the airline ==
Ethiopian Airlines stated that it "strongly refutes" the report and it "was biased, lacking evidence, incomplete and did not present the full account of the accident".

The airline released a press statement on the day the investigation report was presented. In it, they pointed out that the halting of flight data and cockpit voice recordings at 1,300 feet (400 m), disappearing from radar at that time, and eyewitness reports of a fireball "clearly indicate that the aircraft disintegrated in the air due to explosion, which could have been caused by a shoot-down, sabotage, or lightning strike".

== Passengers and crew ==
Ethiopian Airlines issued the following list of the nationalities of the victims:

Country	Passengers	Crew	Total
Lebanon	51	0	51
Ethiopia	23	8	31
United Kingdom	2	0	2
Canada	1	0	1
France	1	0	1
Iraq	1	0	1
Russia	1	0	1
Syria	1	0	1
Turkey	1	0	1
Total	82	8	90

A memorial ceremony was held at the Ethiopian Airlines premises in Addis Ababa on 14 February 2010.

== In the media ==
The accident was dramatised in the twelfth series of the Canadian documentary Mayday (also known as Air Emergency or Air Crash Investigation). It is titled "Heading to Disaster". The episode re-creates the accident based on the Lebanese investigators' final report.

== See also ==
- Ethiopian Airlines accidents and incidents
- Ethiopian Airlines Flight 302, another accident involving loss of control of a Boeing 737
- Colgan Air Flight 3407, another accident where two fatigued pilots lost control of their aircraft
