= Ethiopian Airlines Flight 604 =

1988 aviation accident in Ethiopia

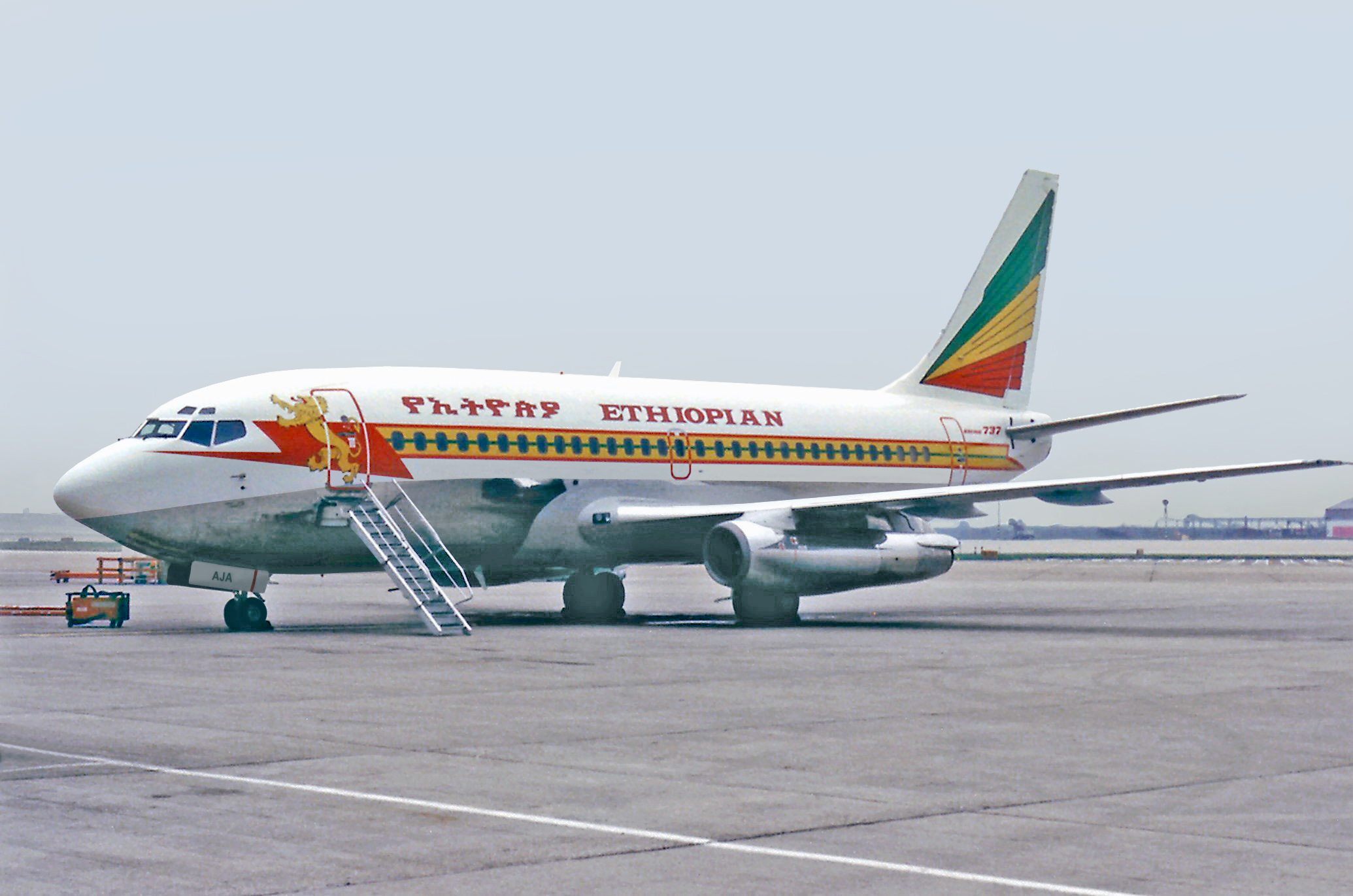
- ET-AJA, the aircraft involved in the accident, pictured in 1987

Accident
- Date: 15 September 1988
- Summary: Belly landing following dual engine failure caused by bird strike
- Site: Bahir Dar Airport, Bahir Dar, Ethiopia; 11°36′17″N 37°19′11″E

Aircraft
- Aircraft type: Boeing 737-260
- Operator: Ethiopian Airlines
- IATA flight No.: ET604
- ICAO flight No.: ETH604
- Call sign: ETHIOPIAN 604
- Registration: ET-AJA
- Flight origin: Bole International Airport, Ethiopia
- Stopover: Bahir Dar Airport, Ethiopia
- Destination: Asmara International Airport, Ethiopia (now in Eritrea)
- Occupants: 104
- Passengers: 98
- Crew: 6
- Fatalities: 35
- Injuries: 27
- Survivors: 69

Ethiopian Airlines Flight 604 was a scheduled Addis Ababa–Bahir Dar–Asmara flight operated by a Boeing 737-200 in which the aircraft caught fire during a belly landing in a clearing near Bahir Dar Airport, Bahir Dar, Ethiopia, on 15 September 1988.

== Aircraft ==
The aircraft involved in the accident was a Boeing 737-260, registration ET-AJA, delivered new to Ethiopian Airlines. At the time of the accident, the aircraft was less than a year old.

== Accident description ==
On 15 September 1988, the aircraft was scheduled to operate the second leg of a domestic Addis Ababa–Bahir Dar–Asmara passenger service with 98 passengers and 6 crew members on board. Both engines of the aircraft ingested a flock of speckled pigeons as it took off from Bahir Dar Airport, and subsequently overheated. One of the engines immediately lost thrust, while the other did so on the emergency return to the departure airport. However, the plane crashed 2 miles before reaching the runway. During the gear-up landing, the aircraft caught fire. Thirty-five passengers died, but all of the crew survived.

== See also ==
- Ethiopian Airlines accidents and incidents
- Ural Airlines Flight 178 – 2019 accident after both engines failed following a bird strike shortly after takeoff
- US Airways Flight 1549 – 2009 accident after both engines failed following a bird strike shortly after takeoff
- Scandinavian Airlines Flight 751 – 1991 accident after both engines failed following ice ingestion shortly after takeoff
- Eastern Air Lines Flight 375 – 1960 accident after the aircraft suffered a bird strike shortly after takeoff
- Jeju Air Flight 2216 - similar accident in 2024 after both engines failed following a bird strike before landing leading to a belly landing
