= Bahir Dar Airport =

Airport in Bahir Dar, Amhara Region, Ethiopia

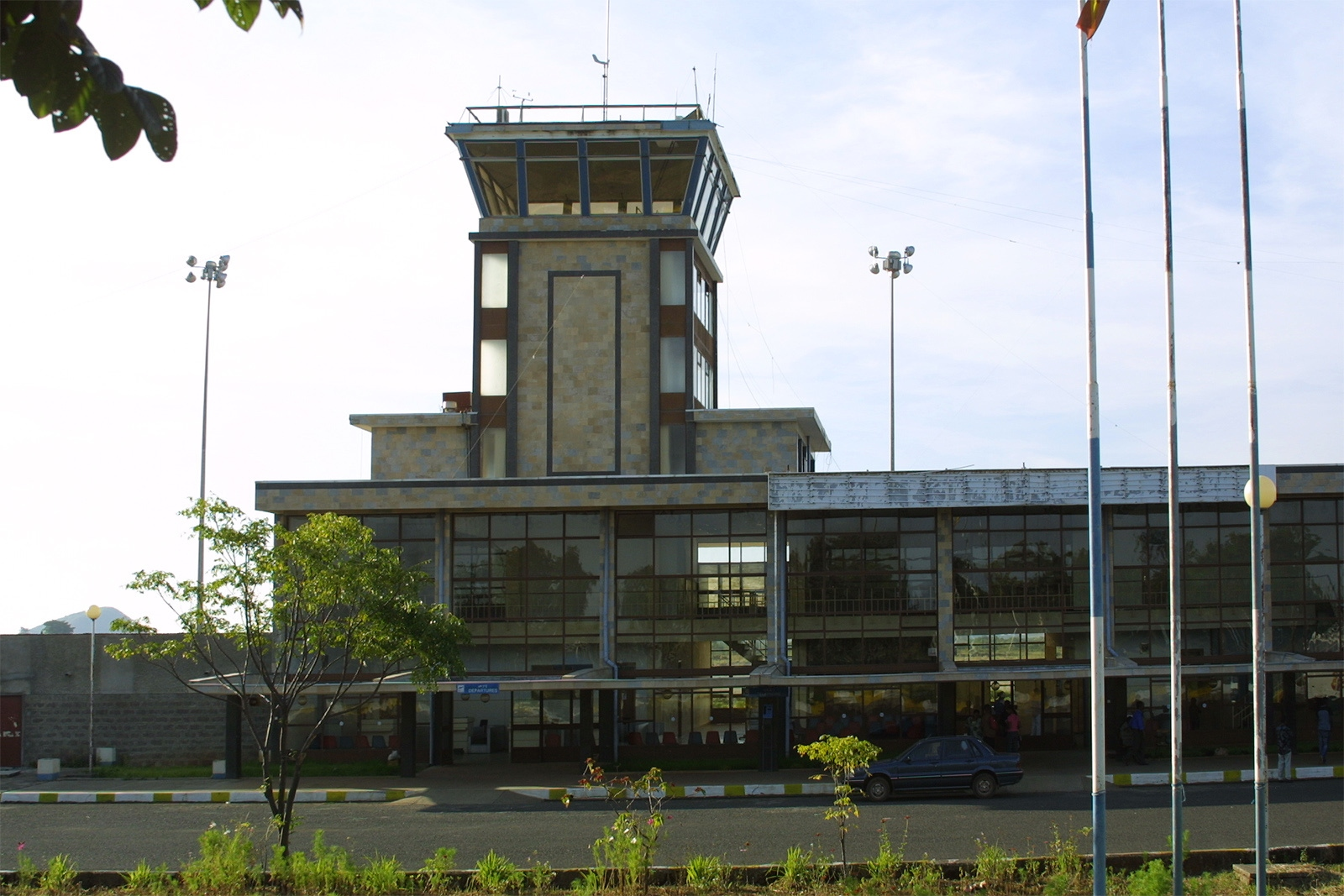
- IATA: BJR; ICAO: HABD

Summary
- Airport type: Public
- Operator: Ethiopian Airports Enterprise
- Serves: Bahir Dar, Ethiopia
- Elevation AMSL: 5,976 ft (1,821 m)
- Coordinates: 11°36′29″N 037°19′17″E

Map
- Location within Ethiopia

Runways
Direction	Length		Surface
Direction	m	ft	Surface
04/22	3,800	9,842	Asphalt/Concrete

Bahir Dar Airport (IATA: BJR, ICAO: HABD), also unofficially known as Dejazmach Belay Zeleke Airport, is a public airport serving Bahir Dar, the capital city of the Amhara Region in Ethiopia. The name of the city and airport may also be transliterated as Bahar Dar. Bahir Dar airport is located 8 km (5 miles) west of Bahir Dar, near Lake Tana. The airport is also used by the Ethiopian Air Force.

In August 2026, Prime Minister Abiy Ahmed inaugurated a new passenger terminal at the airport, describing it as the second-largest terminal in Ethiopia after the one at Bole International Airport.

== Facilities ==
The Bahir Dar Airport sits at an elevation of 5,976 feet (1,821 m) above mean sea level. It has one runway designated 04/22, with an asphalt concrete surface measuring 3,000 by 61 metres (9,843 ft × 200 ft).

== Airlines and destinations ==
Airlines	Destinations
Ethiopian Airlines	Addis Ababa, Lalibela

== Incidents ==
On 11 January 1981, a Douglas C-47A ET-AGW of Ethiopian Airlines was damaged beyond repair when the port undercarriage collapsed on landing.

On 15 September 1988, Ethiopian Airlines Flight 604 operated by Boeing 737-200 ET-AJA ingested pigeons into both engines shortly after takeoff. One engine lost thrust almost immediately and the second lost thrust during the emergency return to the airport. During the crash-landing, 35 of the 104 passengers were killed.
