= Air Charter International =

French charter airline (1966–1998)

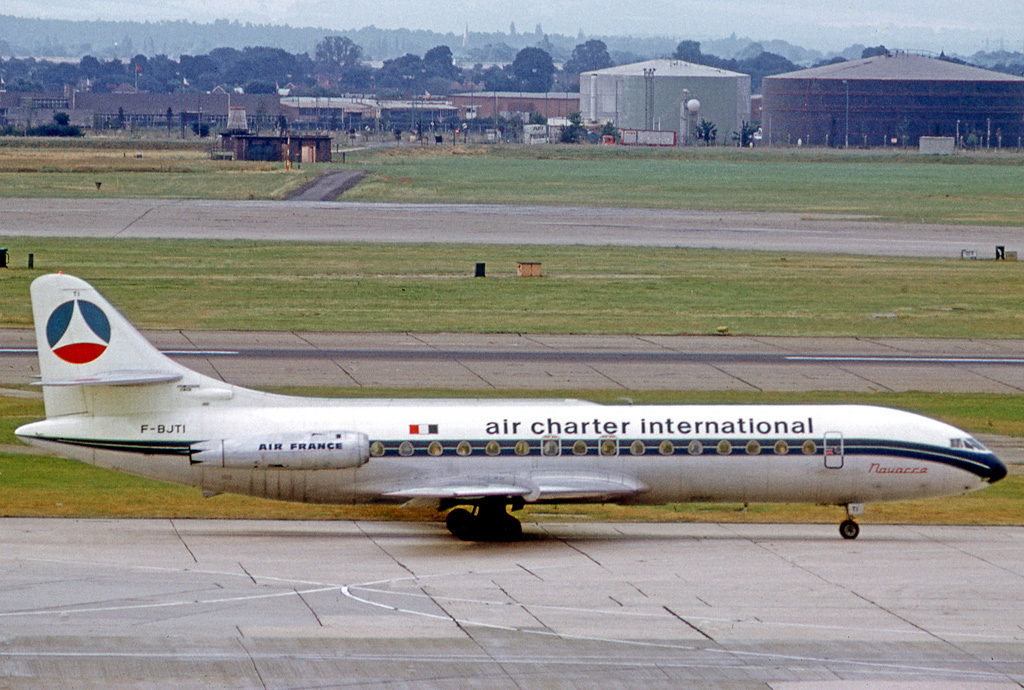
- A Sud Aviation Caravelle 3 with which operations began in 1966
IATA	ICAO	Call sign
SF	ACF	AIR CHARTER
- Founded: 7 February 1966
- Ceased operations: 24 October 1998
- Hubs: Paris-Orly Airport
- Fleet size: 6
- Parent company: Air France (80%); Air Inter (20%)
- Headquarters: Paris, France

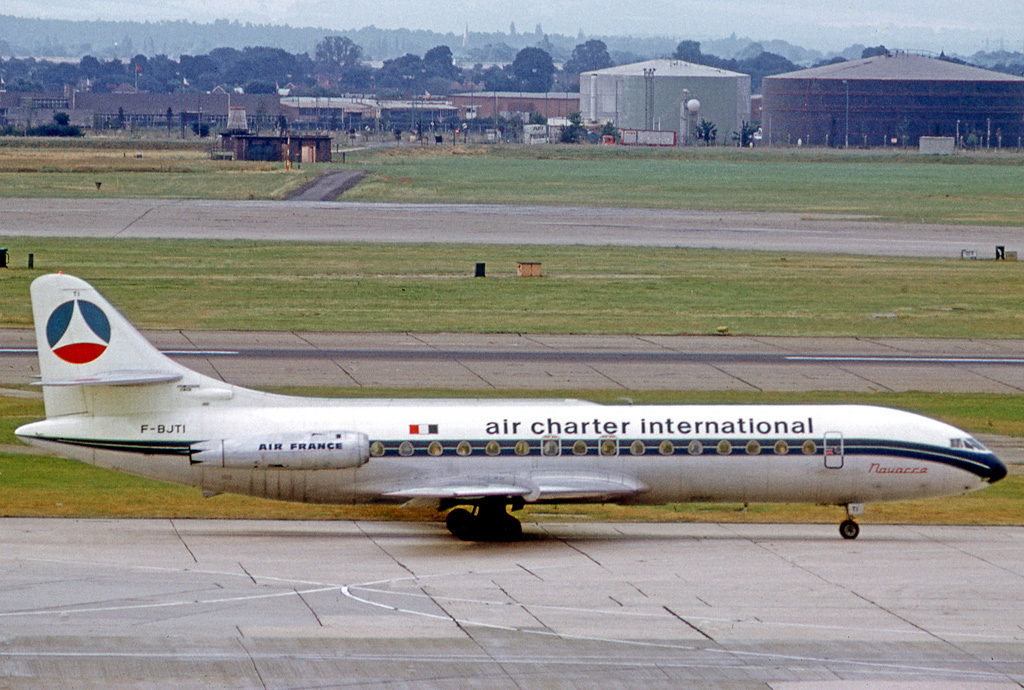
Sud Aviation Caravelle 3 in 1971

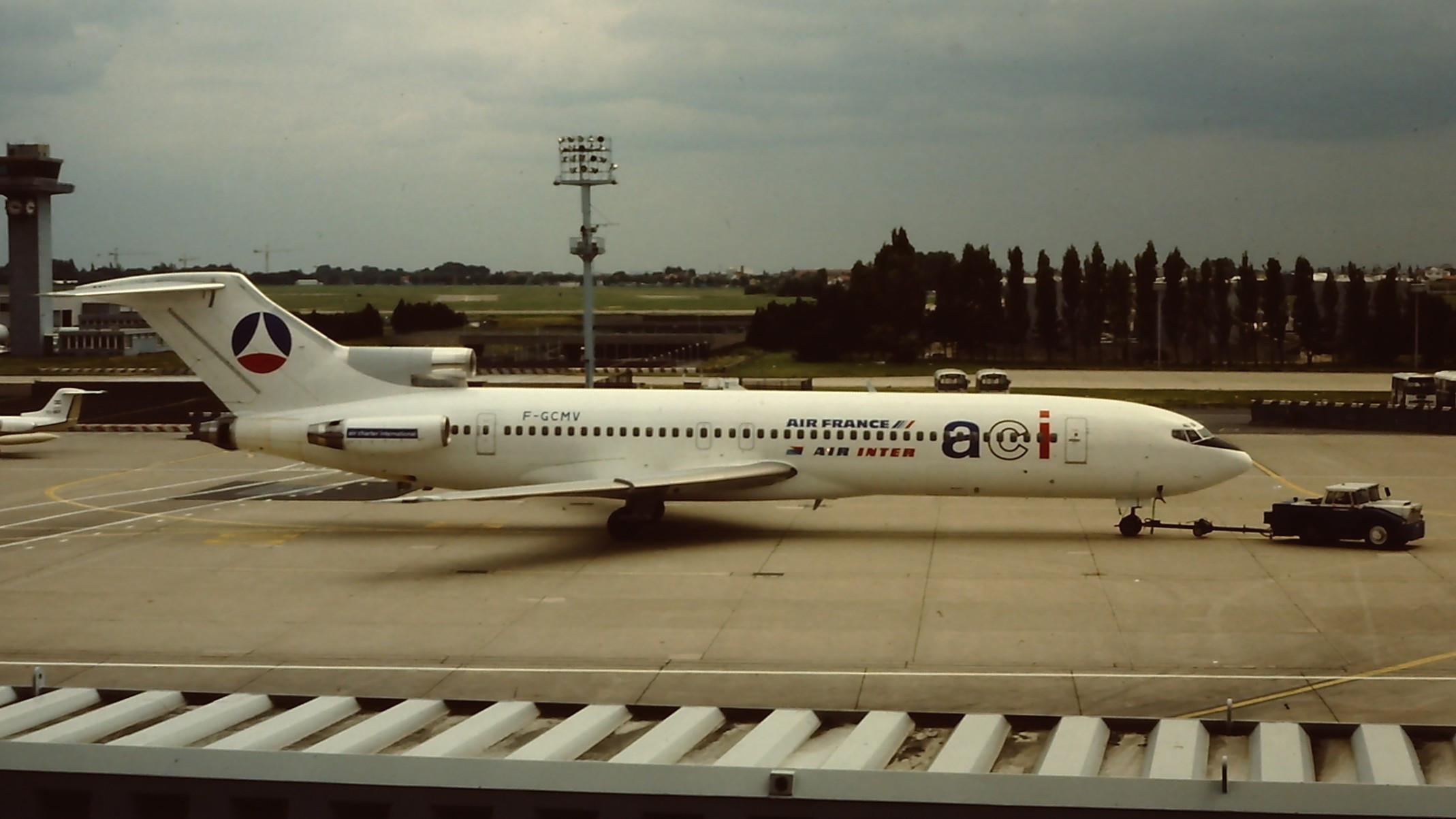
Boeing 727-200 in 1981

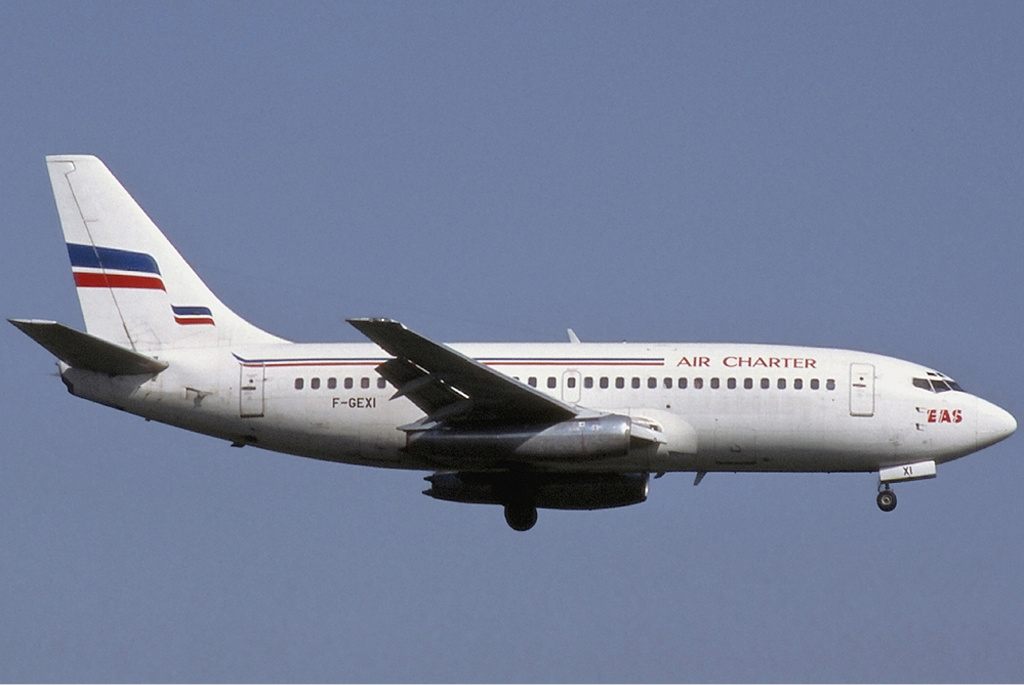
Boeing 737-200

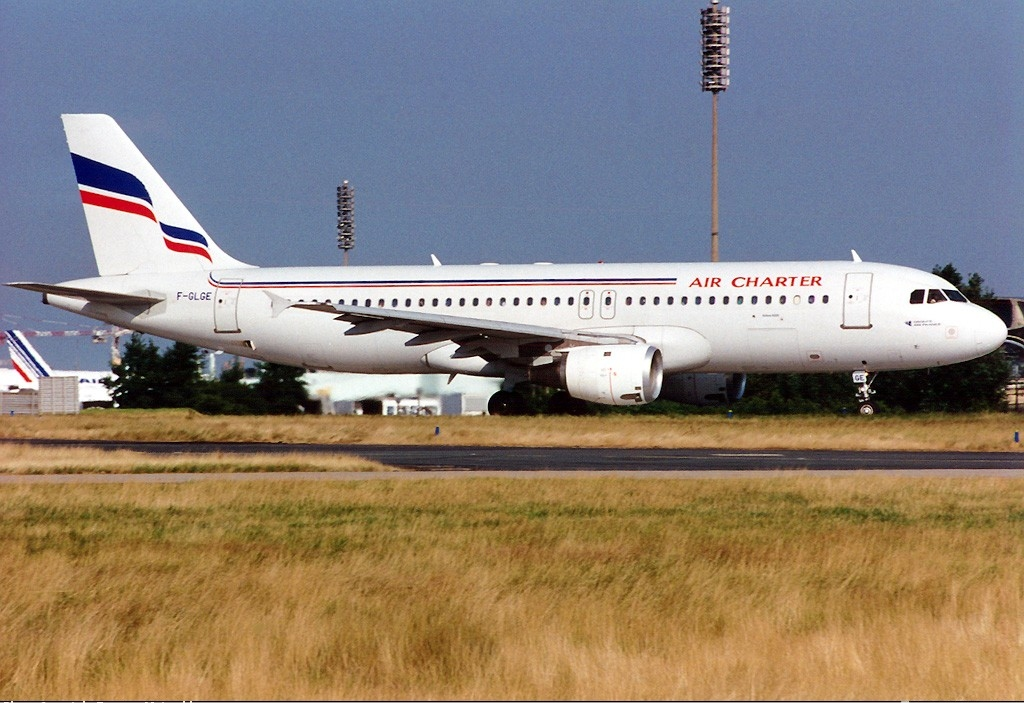
Airbus A320-200

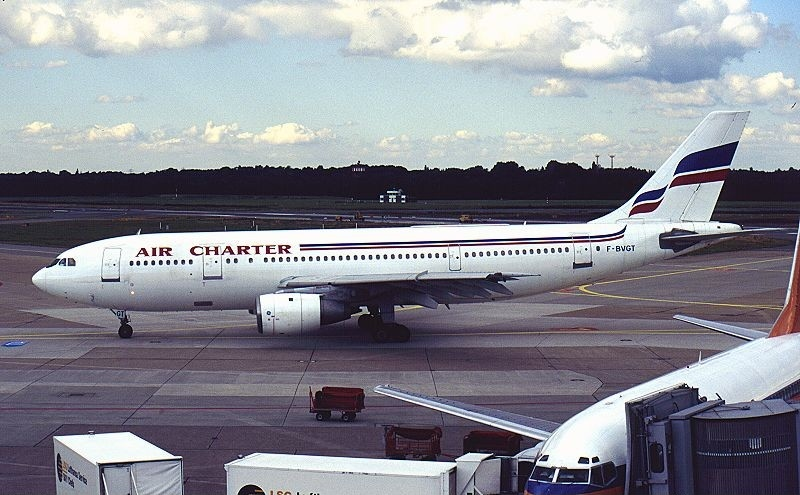
Airbus A300B4

Air Charter International was a French charter airline which operated from 1966 to 1998.

== History ==
The air carrier was established on 7 February 1966 as a subsidiary of Air France under the corporate name Societé Aérienne Française d'Affrètements (SAFA). Flight operations began on 25 July 1966 with two Sud Caravelles and two Lockheed Super Constellations made available by the parent company. These flew charter flights from Paris to the Mediterranean basin.

On 8 December 1969 the airline changed its trading name to Air Charter International (ACI). In 1971, ACI operated a fleet of seven Caravelles and carried about 420.000 passengers. The first two Boeing 727-200 were introduced in 1972. Transatlantic charter flights to the USA and Canada were offered from 1982 onwards with leased Boeing 747-200 aircraft operated by Air France. Six Super Caravelles were leased from EAS Europe Airlines until 1992.

In 1984, the airline's trading name was shortened to Air Charter. As the business grew, the first wide-body aircraft was introduced in 1988, the Airbus A300B4. Two Boeing 737-200 from EAS Europe Aéro Service on 1988. In November 1993 the airline started flying schedules on Air France behalf. By the mid-1990s, the 727s were replaced by the Airbus A320. After the merger of Air France and Air Inter in Spring 1997, Air Charter had he finished his mission and all services were discontinued on 24 October 1998.

== Fleet ==
Air Charter operated the following aircraft:

Air Charter International fleet
Aircraft	Total	Introduced	Retired	Notes
Airbus A300B4	2	1988	1998	1 leased from Air France
Airbus A310-300	2	1997	1998	
Airbus A320-200	7	1994	1998	2 leased from Air France; 1 leased TransAer International Airlines
Boeing 727-200	11	1972	1995	4 leased from Air France
Boeing 737-200	5	1987	1995	1 leased from Euralair; 2 leased from Inter Ciel Service; 2 leased from EAS Europe Airlines
Boeing 737-200	2	1996	1998	
Boeing 737-300	1	1991	1991	Leased from AWAS
Boeing 737-400	1	1991	1992	
Boeing 737-500	1	1991	1992	
Boeing 737-500	1	1996	1997	
Boeing 747-200	1	1982	Unknown	Operated by Air France
Lockheed L-1049 Super Constellation	2	1966	Unknown	Operated by Air France
Dassault Mercure	Unknown	Unknown	Unknown	Operated by Air Inter
Sud Aviation Caravelle 3	11	1970	1989	
Sud Aviation Caravelle 10B	4	1981	1991	

== Accidents and incidents ==
- On 26 June 1988, an Airbus A320-100 operated for Air France as Air France Flight 296Q crashed into a forest while performing a low pass over the Habsheim Air Show.
