= IRGC Fajr =

Fajr

General information
- Type: Military utility aircraft
- National origin: Iran
- Manufacturer: IRGC

History
- First flight: February 1988

The IRGC Fajr (فجر - "Dawn") was a light aircraft flown in Iran in 1988, intended for general military use including training, liaison, and reconnaissance. Of all-composite construction, it was claimed to be the first aircraft to be designed and built in that country, although it was speculated in the West that it may have been merely a Lancair homebuilt design constructed there.
