= Mulhouse–Habsheim Airfield =

Mulhouse–Habsheim Airfield Aérodrome de Mulhouse-Habsheim
- IATA: none; ICAO: LFGB

Summary
- Airport type: Public
- Location: Habsheim, France
- Elevation AMSL: 787 ft / 240 m
- Coordinates: 47°44′17″N 007°25′56″E
- Interactive map of Mulhouse–Habsheim Airfield

Runways
| Direction | Length | | Surface |
| Direction | m | ft | Surface |
|---|---|---|---|
| 02/20 | 1,120 | 3,675 | Asphalt |

Mulhouse–Habsheim Airfield (ICAO: LFGB) is a recreational aerodrome near the town of Habsheim in France. It is a former military base, and is now mainly used for light aircraft. The field also hosts the Aéro-Club des Trois Frontières, Aéro-Club du Haut-Rhin, Air Alsace.

== Incidents and accidents ==
On 26 June 1988, Mulhouse–Habsheim Airfield was the site of the crash of Air France Flight 296Q. It was the first ever crash of an Airbus A320 type aircraft. As part of an airshow, the aircraft crew were briefed to do a low flypast of the airfield, which they did, but throttled up too late to avoid a forest at the end of the runway. Three passengers were killed, and the aircraft was destroyed.

== See also ==
- EuroAirport Basel Mulhouse Freiburg
