= Air France Flight 296Q =

1988 aviation accident in France

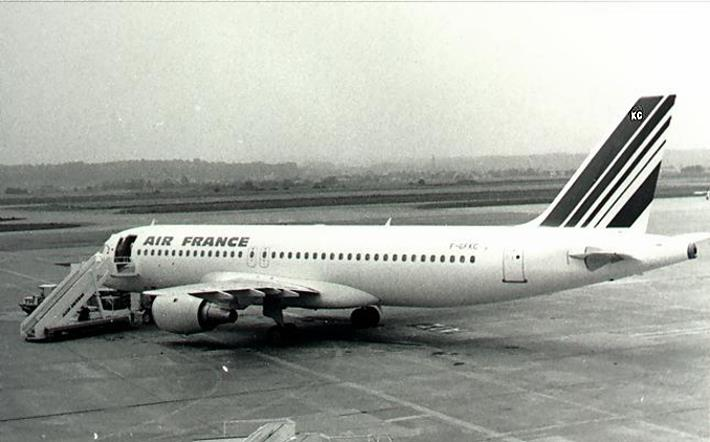
- F-GFKC, the aircraft involved in the accident

Accident
- Date: 26 June 1988
- Summary: Controlled flight into terrain during go-around
- Site: Mulhouse–Habsheim Airfield, Mulhouse, France; 47°44′58″N 7°25′34″E

Aircraft
- Aircraft type: Airbus A320-111
- Aircraft name: Ville d'Amsterdam
- Operator: Air Charter International on behalf of Air France
- IATA flight No.: SF296Q
- ICAO flight No.: ACF296Q
- Call sign: AIR CHARTER 296 QUEBEC
- Registration: F-GFKC
- Flight origin: Charles de Gaulle Airport
- Stopover: Mulhouse–Habsheim Airfield
- Destination: Basel–Mulhouse Airport
- Occupants: 136
- Passengers: 130
- Crew: 6
- Fatalities: 3
- Injuries: 50
- Survivors: 133

Air France Flight 296Q was a chartered flight of a new Airbus A320 operated by Air Charter International for Air France. On 26 June 1988, the plane crashed while making a low pass over Mulhouse–Habsheim Airfield (ICAO: LFGB), France, as part of the Habsheim Air Show. Most of the crash sequence, which occurred in front of several thousand spectators, was caught on video.

This was the aircraft's first passenger flight following delivery and most of those on board were journalists and raffle competition winners who had won tickets in a promotional event by local businesses. The low-speed flyover, with landing gear down, was supposed to take place at an altitude of 100 feet (30 m); instead, the plane performed the flyover at 30 ft (9 m), skimmed the treetops of the forest at the end of the runway (which had not been shown on the airport map given to the pilots) and crashed.

All 136 passengers survived the initial impact, but three died of smoke inhalation from the subsequent fire; a quadriplegic boy in seat 4F, a 7-year-old girl in seat 8C, trapped by her seat being pushed forward and struggling to open the seat belt, and an adult who had reached the exit then turned back to try to help the 7 year old. The child had been traveling with her older brother but they were seated apart; he survived after he was forced out of the aircraft by a flow of other surviving passengers as he tried to find his sister.

Official reports concluded that the pilots flew too low, too slow, failed to see the forest and accidentally flew into it. The captain, Michel Asseline, disputed the report and claimed an error in the fly-by-wire computer prevented him from applying thrust and pulling up. Five individuals, including the captain and first officer, were found guilty of involuntary manslaughter. Captain Asseline, who maintained his innocence, served ten months in prison and a further ten months probation.

This was the first fatal crash involving an Airbus A320.

== Aircraft ==
The Airbus A320-111, registration F-GFKC, serial number 9, first flew on 6 January 1988 and was delivered to Air France on 23 June, three days prior to the crash. It was the third A320 delivered to Air France, the launch customer.

== Flight deck crew ==
Captain Michel Asseline, 44, had been a pilot with Air France for almost twenty years and had the following endorsements: Caravelle; Boeing 707, 727, and 737; and Airbus A300 and A310. He was a highly distinguished pilot with 10,463 flight hours. A training captain since 1979, Asseline was appointed to head the company's A320 training subdivision at the end of 1987. As Air France's technical pilot, he had been heavily involved in test flying the A320 type and had carried out maneuvers beyond normal operational limitations. Asseline had total confidence in the aircraft's computer systems.

First Officer Pierre Mazières, 45, had been flying with the airline since 1969 and had been a training captain for six years. He was endorsed on the Caravelle, Boeing 707 and 737, and had qualified as an A320 captain three months before the accident. Mazières had 10,853 hours of flight time.

== Flight plan ==
At the time of the incident, only three of the new aircraft type had been delivered to Air France, and the newest one (in service for two days) had been chosen for the flyover.

The aircraft was to fly from Charles de Gaulle Airport to Basel–Mulhouse Airport for a press conference. Then, sightseeing charter passengers would board and the aircraft would fly the short distance to the small Mulhouse–Habsheim Airfield. The captain would make a low-level fly-pass over Runway 02, climb up and turn back, and repeat the fly-pass over the same runway in the reciprocal direction (Runway 20). This would be followed by a sightseeing trip south to Mont Blanc before the passengers would be returned to Basel–Mulhouse Airport. Finally, the aircraft would return to Paris.

The pilots had each had a busy weekend and did not receive the flight plan until the morning of the flight. They received no verbal details about the flyover or the aerodrome itself.

== Accident ==
The flight plan was that as the flight approached the airfield, the pilot would extend the third-stage flap, lower the landing gear, and line up for a level flight at 100 feet (30 m). The captain would slow the aircraft to its minimum flying speed with maximum angle of attack, disable the "alpha floor" (the function that would otherwise automatically advance engine thrust to TO/GA when the IAS reaches αMax), and rely on the first officer to adjust the engine thrust manually to maintain 100 feet. After the first pass, the first officer would then apply TO/GA power and climb steeply before turning back for the second pass. "I've done it twenty times!" Asseline assured his first officer. The flyover had been approved by Air France's Air Operations Directorate and Flight Safety Department, and air traffic control and Basel tower had been informed.

Habsheim Aerodrome was too small to be listed in the aircraft's flight computer, thereby requiring a visual approach; both pilots were also unfamiliar with the airfield when they began their descent from 2,000 feet (610 m) only 6 nautical miles (11 km) from the field. This distance was too short for them to stabilise the aircraft's altitude and speed for the flyover. Additionally, the captain was expecting from the flight plan to do the pass over runway 02 (3,281 feet (1,000 m) long, paved) and was preparing for that alignment. But as the aircraft approached the field, the flight deck crew noticed that the spectators were gathered beside runway 34R (2,100 feet (640 m) long, grass). This last-minute deviation in the approach further distracted the crew from stabilising the aircraft's altitude and they quickly dropped to 40 feet (12 m).

From higher up, the forest at the end of 34R had merely looked like a different type of grass rather than what it was: a forest with trees. But now that the aircraft was performing its flyover at only thirty feet, the crew noticed the aircraft was lower than the now-identified hazard that they were fast approaching. The cockpit voice recorder recorded the first officer's call:

First officer: "TO/GA power! Go-around track!"

Followed by:

Cockpit area microphone (CAM): (increase in engine speed)
CAM: (noises of impact with treetops)
Captain: "Oh s***!"
END OF TAPE

The crew applied full power and Asseline attempted to climb. However, the elevators did not respond to the pilot's commands because the A320's computer system engaged its "alpha protection" mode (meant to prevent the aircraft from entering a stall). Less than five seconds later, the turbines began ingesting leaves and branches as the aircraft skimmed the tops of the trees. The combustion chambers clogged and the engines failed. The aircraft fell to the ground.

Traditionally, pilots respect the inherent dangers of flying at low speeds at low altitudes, and normally, a pilot would not attempt to fly an aircraft so close to stalling with the engines at flight idle (minimum thrust setting in flight). In this instance, however, the pilots involved did not hesitate to fly the aircraft below its normal minimum flying speed because the purpose of the flyover was to demonstrate that the aircraft's computer systems would ensure that lift would always be available regardless of how the pilots handled the controls. Asseline's experience of flying the aircraft type at the outer limits of its flight performance envelope may have led to overconfidence and complacency.

External videos
- Air France Flight 296Q crash footage on YouTube

During the impact, the right wing was torn off, and the spilling fuel ignited immediately. Two fire trucks at the airshow set off and an ambulance followed. Local emergency services were informed by radio communication.

Inside the aircraft, all the lights had gone out before it came to a final rest; there was no emergency lighting apart from the exit signs. Many passengers were dazed from hitting their heads on the backs of the seats in front of them. Some passengers had difficulty unfastening their seatbelts because they were unfamiliar with the mechanism (which differs from the type used in car seatbelts). The purser went to announce instructions to the passengers but the public address system handset had been torn off. He then tried to open the left-side forward door, which was blocked by trees. The door opened partway, and the emergency escape slide began inflating while it was stuck partly inside the fuselage. The purser, a passenger, and a flight attendant (a guest from another airline) managed to push the door fully open. In the process, the purser and the passenger were thrown out of the fuselage with the slide landing on top of them. The flight attendant then began evacuating the passengers but they soon began to pile up at the bottom of the slide as their route was blocked by trees and branches. The egress of the passengers was temporarily halted while the purser and another flight attendant began clearing the branches. When the evacuation continued, the flight attendant stayed at the door, helping passengers, until she began suffering from smoke inhalation.

By this time, the fire had entered the right side of the fuselage through the damaged floor section between seat rows 10 and 15. A passenger tried to open the left-side overwing exit. It would not open, which was fortunate as there was by that time a fire on the left wing.

The panicking passengers now began pushing toward the front of the cabin. A flight attendant standing in the centre of the cabin at seat 12D was pushed into the aisle by a severely burnt passenger from 12F. Then, as she was helping another passenger whose clothes were on fire, she was carried forward by the surge of people rushing to escape. After the rush of people had left and the interior was fast becoming toxic, she stood at the front door and called back into the cabin. There was no reply and the thick black smoke made a visual check impossible, so she exited the fuselage. The evacuation from the rear door had been fast and smooth thanks to the instructions from the flight attendants at the rear of the aircraft.

The medical team from the air-show arrived and began examining the passengers. Ten minutes after the crash, the first of the fire trucks arrived. But because of the forest, only the smaller vehicles were able to reach the wreckage. Apart from the tail section, the aircraft was consumed by fire.

Of 136 people on board, three did not escape. One was a disabled 14-year-old boy named Hervé Liermann in seat 4F who was unable to move. Another was a 7-year-old girl named Mariama Barry in seat 8C, who was trapped, unable to remove her seatbelt after a seatback collapsed on top of her (her older brother had removed his own seatbelt but was carried away by the rush of people before he could help his sister). The third was a woman named Marie-Françoise Froesch who had reached the front door and then returned to help the girl. Thirty-four passengers required hospitalization for injuries and burns. Both pilots received minor head injuries and also suffered from smoke inhalation and shock.

== Investigation ==
The official investigation was carried out by the Bureau of Enquiry and Analysis for Civil Aviation Safety (BEA), the French air accident investigation bureau, in conjunction with Air France and Airbus. Although the official investigation was written in French, the BEA released an English version on 29 November 1989. The translated version of the report can be found on the Aviation Accidents Database and at the Aviation Safety Network.

=== Flight recorders ===
The plane's flight recorders were found still attached in the unburnt tail section. The cockpit voice recorder (CVR) continued to operate for about 1.5 seconds after the initial impact. The digital flight data decorder (DFDR) continued to operate for about one second, then recorded nonsensical data for another two seconds. Interruption of the power occurred forward of the tail section—most probably in the wheel-well area, which was heavily damaged.

The CVR was read during the night of 26 June at the BEA. The transcription was later clarified with the assistance of the pilots involved. The tape speed was set using the 400 Hz frequency of the aircraft's electrical supply and then synchronised with the air traffic control recordings, which included a time track.

The DFDR was read the same night by the Brétigny sur Orge Flight Test Centre:

- 12:43:44 - the aircraft begins its descent from 2,000 feet (610 m), initially at a rate of 300 feet (91 m) per minute with 'Flaps 1'.
- 12:44:14 - the engine power is reduced to flight idle. Three seconds later, the undercarriage is extended. A further ten seconds later, 'Flaps 2' is selected.
- 12:44:45 - 'Flaps 3' is selected as the aircraft descends through 500 feet (150 m) at an airspeed of 177 knots.
- 12:45:06 - the aircraft descends through 200 feet (61 m) at an airspeed of 155 knots.
- 12:45:15 - the aircraft, now at 90 feet (27 m), begins a deviation to the right (maximum bank angle: 30°) to line up with the grass strip 34R.
- 12:45:23 - the aircraft completes the deviation at a height of 46 feet (14 m) and an airspeed of 141 knots. During this manoeuvre, a fluctuation in the radio altimeter height corresponds to the aircraft passing over a patch of trees (whereas before and after this fluctuation, the readings of the radio altimeter and those of the barometric altimeter match perfectly). Three seconds later, the aircraft descends through 40 feet (12 m) at an airspeed of 132 knots. The captain begins to flare the aircraft (he lifts the nose 4°) to level its flight. The aircraft levels off at 30 feet (9.1 m).
- 12:45:30 - nose-up attitude increases to 7°.
- 12:45:35 - nose-up attitude is now 15° and speed is 122 knots. TO/GA power is applied. Four seconds later, the aircraft begins striking the treetops.

=== Aircraft and engines ===
Investigators found that the aircraft had been airworthy, that its weight and centre-of-gravity had been within limits, and that there was no evidence of mechanical or electronic systems failure.

The flight deck crew believed that the engines had failed to respond to the application of full power. With the CFM56-5 engines, four seconds are required to go from 29% N_{1} (Note: The speed of the Stage 1 fan of a turbofan engine, expressed as a percentage of normal maximum) (flight idle) to 67%. It then takes one second more to go from 67 to 83% N_{1}. From the engine parameters recorded on the DFDR and spectral analysis of the engine sounds on the CVR, it was determined that five seconds after TO/GA power was applied, the N_{1} speed of Nº1 engine was 83% while that of Nº2 engine was 84%. Spectral analysis of the engine sounds indicated that 0.6 seconds later, both engines had reached 91% (by this stage, they were starting to ingest vegetation). This response of the engines complied with their certification data.

=== Official report ===
The official report from BEA concluded that the probable cause of the accident was a combination of the following:

- Very low flyover height, lower than surrounding obstacles;
- Speed very slow and reducing to reach maximum possible angle of attack;
- Engines speed at flight idle; and
- Late application of go-around power.

Furthermore, the bureau concluded that if the descent below 100 feet was not deliberate, it may have resulted from a failure by the crew to take proper account of the visual and aural information available to them regarding the elevation "above ground level" (AGL) of the aircraft.

The report further recommended that:

- Passengers should be banned from all demonstration flights
- Flight crews should be provided with – and ensure – proper reconnaissance of airfields
- Airline company procedures should be reviewed to ensure they comply with official regulations concerning altitude

=== Prosecutions ===
In 1996, Captain Asseline, First Officer Mazières, two Air France officials and the president of the flying club sponsoring the air show were all charged with involuntary manslaughter. In 1997, all five were found guilty. Asseline was initially sentenced to six months in prison along with twelve months of probation. Mazières was given a twelve-month suspended sentence. The others were sentenced to probation. Asseline walked free from the court and said he would appeal to France's highest court, the Court of Cassation (French: Cour de Cassation). According to French law, Asseline was required to submit himself to the prison system before his case could be taken up by the Court of Cassation. In 1998, Asseline's appeal was rejected and his sentence was increased to ten months of imprisonment along with ten months of probation.

=== Alternative explanation ===
The television documentary series Mayday also reports claims in a season 9 episode that the plane's flight recorder might have been tampered with and indicated that four seconds had been cut from the tape; this was shown by playing back a control tower tape and comparing it to the remaining tape. Asseline argues that he attempted to apply thrust earlier than indicated in the flight recorder data. When he increased throttle to level off at 100 ft, the engines did not respond. Asseline claims that this indicated a problem with the aeroplane's fly-by-wire system rather than pilot error. After a few seconds, Asseline claims, he became worried that the plane's completely computerised throttle control had malfunctioned and responded by pulling the throttle all the way back then forward again. By that time, the aircraft had touched the trees. Mayday also looks at the theory that it was the computer at fault, not the pilots. Because the aircraft's altitude had fallen below 100 ft, the plane's computer may have been programmed to believe it was landing and therefore prevent any drastic manoeuvres from either pilot. When the crew suddenly asked the plane for more power and lift, it may have simply ignored them.

It was also claimed by the Institute of Police Forensic Evidence and Criminology, based in Switzerland, that the flight data recorders may have been switched and were not the original ones in the airplane. Airbus made a detailed rebuttal of these claims in a document published in 1991, contending that the independent investigator employed by the filmmakers made an error when synchronising the recordings based on a misunderstanding of how the "Radio Transmit" parameter on the flight data recorder functioned.

== Depictions in media ==
The episode "Blaming the Pilot" of the TV series Survival in the Sky featured the accident.

The Discovery Channel Canada / National Geographic Channel TV series Mayday featured the accident and subsequent investigation in a season 9 episode titled "Pilot vs. Plane" and included an interview with Captain Michel Asseline, survivors, and accident investigators.

The episode "Disastrous Descents" of the TV series Aircrash Confidential produced by WMR Productions and IMG Entertainment, featured the accident and included an interview with Captain Michel Asseline.

News coverage of the accident is briefly seen in the 2001 film Amélie when the title character is flipping through TV channels.

== See also ==
- List of accidents and incidents involving commercial aircraft
- List of air show accidents and incidents in the 20th century
