= Subdivisions of Eritrea =

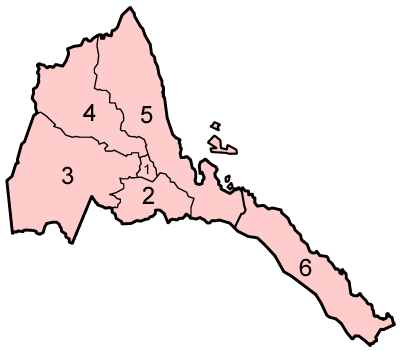
Regions of Eritrea

Eritrea is divided into six regions (zobas) and subdivided into subregions ("sub-zobas"). The geographical extent of the regions is based on their respective hydrological properties. This a dual intent on the part of the Eritrean government: to provide each administration with sufficient control over its agricultural capacity, and to eliminate historical intra-regional conflicts.

Regions and subregions of Eritrea
No.	Region (ዞባ)	Subregion (ንኡስ ዞባ)
1	Central (ዞባ ማእከል)	Berik, Debubawi Mibrak, Debubawi Mierab, Galanefhi, Semienawi Mibrak, Semienawi Mierab, Serejeka
2	Southern (ዞባ ደቡብ)	Adi Keyh, Adi Quala, Areza, Dbarwa, Dekemhare, Emni Haili, Maimine, May Aini, Mendefera, Segeneity, Senafe, Tsorona
3	Gash-Barka (ዞባ ጋሽ ባርካ)	Akurdet, Barentu, Dige, Forto, Gogne, Haykota, Lalay Gash, Logo Anseba, Mensura, Mogolo, Molqi, Omhajer, Shambuko, Tesseney
4	Anseba (ዞባ ዓንሰባ)	Adi Tekeliezan, Asmat, Elabered, Gheleb, Habero, Hagaz, Halhal, Hamelmalo, Keren, Kerkebet, Sela
5	Northern Red Sea (ዞባ ሰሜናዊ ቀይሕ ባሕሪ)	Adobha, Afabet, Dahlak, Foro, Ghelaelo, Ghinda, Karura, Massawa, Nakfa, Shieb
6	Southern Red Sea (ዞባ ደቡባዊ ቀይሕ ባሕሪ)	Araeta, Asseb, Debub Debubawi Keih Bahri, Maekel Debubawi Keih Bahri
