= Nefasit =

Nefasit نفاسيت
- Town
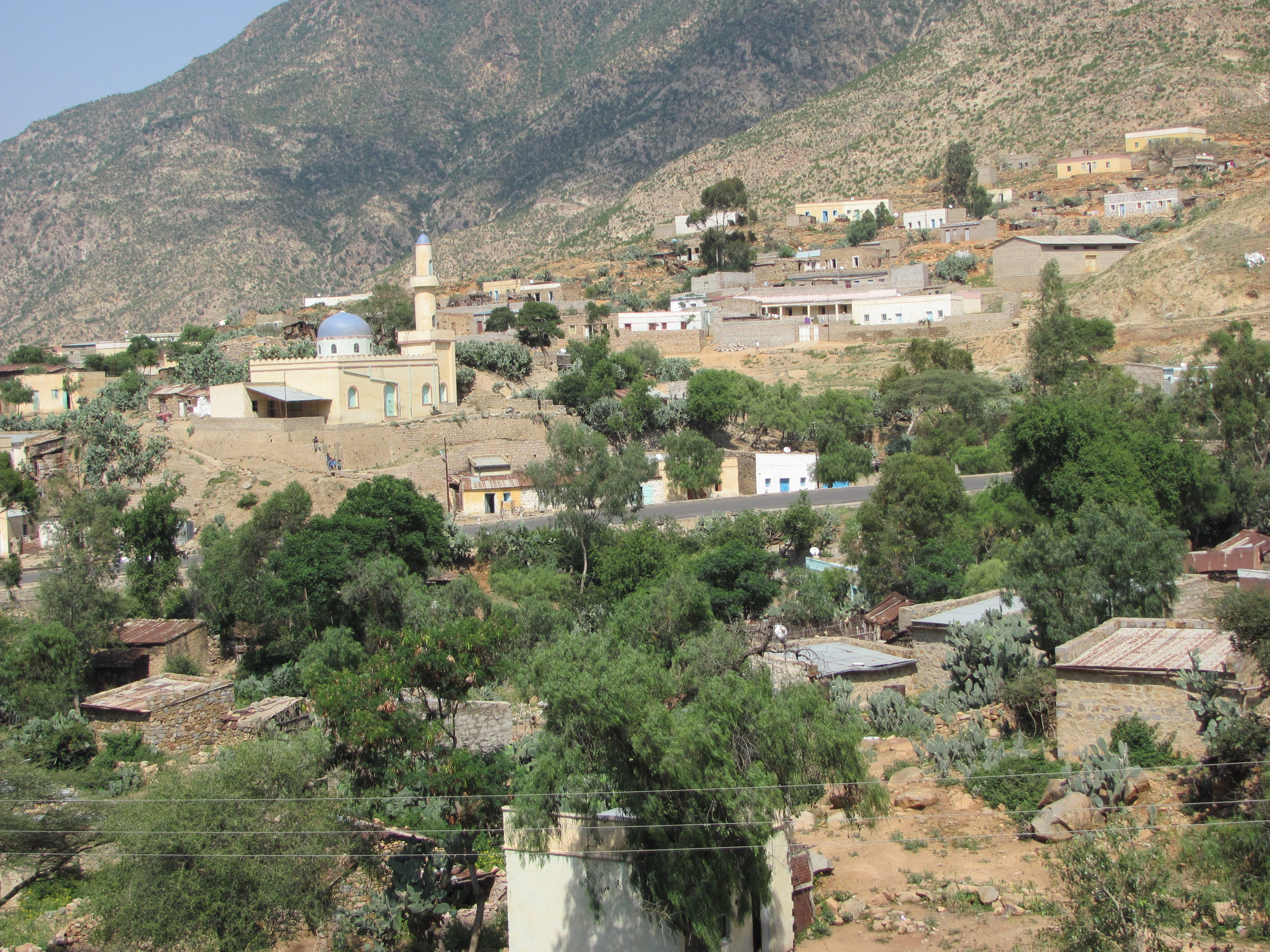

- Location in Eritrea
- Coordinates: 15°20′00″N 39°03′43″E
- Country: Eritrea
- Region: Northern Red Sea
- District: Ghinda
- Elevation: 1,700 m (5,500 ft)

Population (2005)
  - Total: 8,727
- Climate: Cfa

Nefasit (Arabic: نفاسيت, Tigrinya: ነፋሲት Tigrinya pronunciation: [nɐfasit]), also known as Tappa Nefasit, is a small town in the Northern Red Sea Region of Eritrea. Monastery of Debre Bizen is located at the mountains above.

According to multiple tour groups the stretch between the capital Asmara and Nefasit is the most beautiful in Eritrea. There's a colonial era Italian railway that occasionally runs from Asmara.

== Climate ==
Climate data for Nefasit
Month	Jan	Feb	Mar	Apr	May	Jun	Jul	Aug	Sep	Oct	Nov	Dec	Year
Mean daily maximum °C (°F)	25.1 (77.2)	26.0 (78.8)	27.5 (81.5)	28.6 (83.5)	29.7 (85.5)	30.3 (86.5)	27.0 (80.6)	26.7 (80.1)	28.5 (83.3)	27.5 (81.5)	25.6 (78.1)	24.7 (76.5)	27.3 (81.1)
Mean daily minimum °C (°F)	8.9 (48.0)	9.6 (49.3)	11.1 (52.0)	12.7 (54.9)	14.5 (58.1)	16.8 (62.2)	16.6 (61.9)	17.3 (63.1)	15.6 (60.1)	12.8 (55.0)	10.6 (51.1)	9.5 (49.1)	13.0 (55.4)
Average precipitation mm (inches)	65 (2.6)	71 (2.8)	48 (1.9)	54 (2.1)	41 (1.6)	26 (1.0)	125 (4.9)	126 (5.0)	39 (1.5)	58 (2.3)	45 (1.8)	68 (2.7)	766 (30.2)
Source: Climate Data
