= Adi Bakel =

Adi Bakel ዓዲ ባዕከል
- Location in Eritrea
- Coordinates: 15°00′54.6″N 39°06′55.4″E
- Country: Eritrea
- Region: Debub
- Elevation: 2,092 m (6,864 ft)

Adi Bakel Tigrinya: ዓዲ ባዕከል, also spelled Adiba'ikel or Ādība’ikel) is a village in the Debub region and Hadegti sub-region in Eritrea.

The Hadegti Subregion includes the villages Adi Bakel, Iwanet, Adebuur, Adi Keyih, Hadish Adi, Maereba and Degra Merieto.

The inhabitants of Hadegti speak Tigrinya. In Adi Bakel, there are two Orthodox Tewahedo Churches.

"Adi" means "village" or "hometown" and "Bakel" means a red clay.

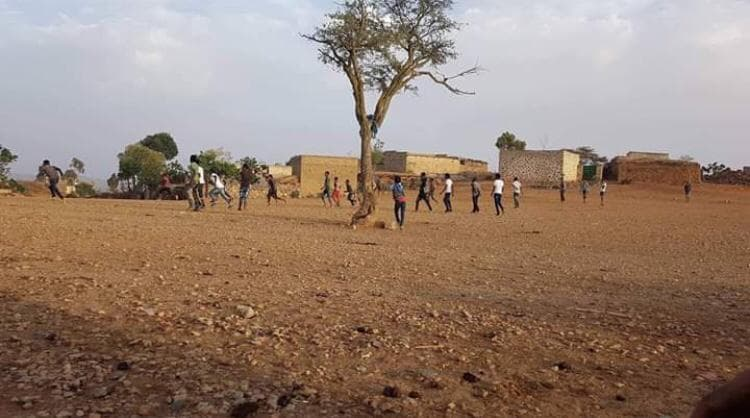
Adi Bakel residents playing football

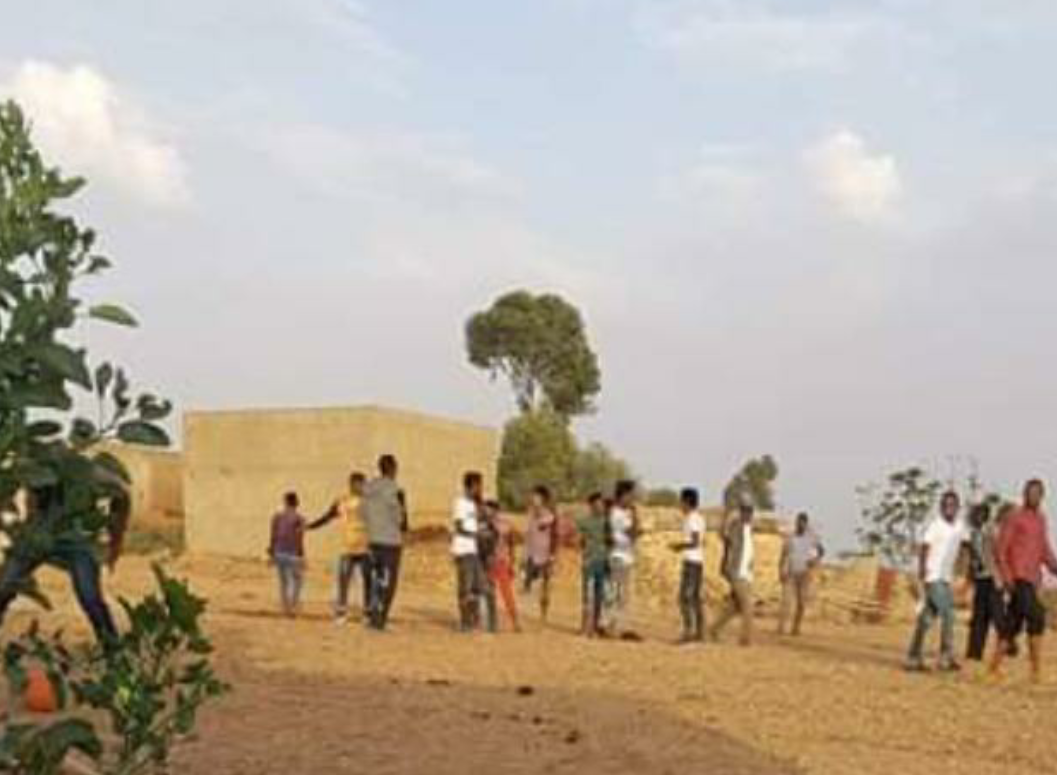
Adi Bakel residents playing football

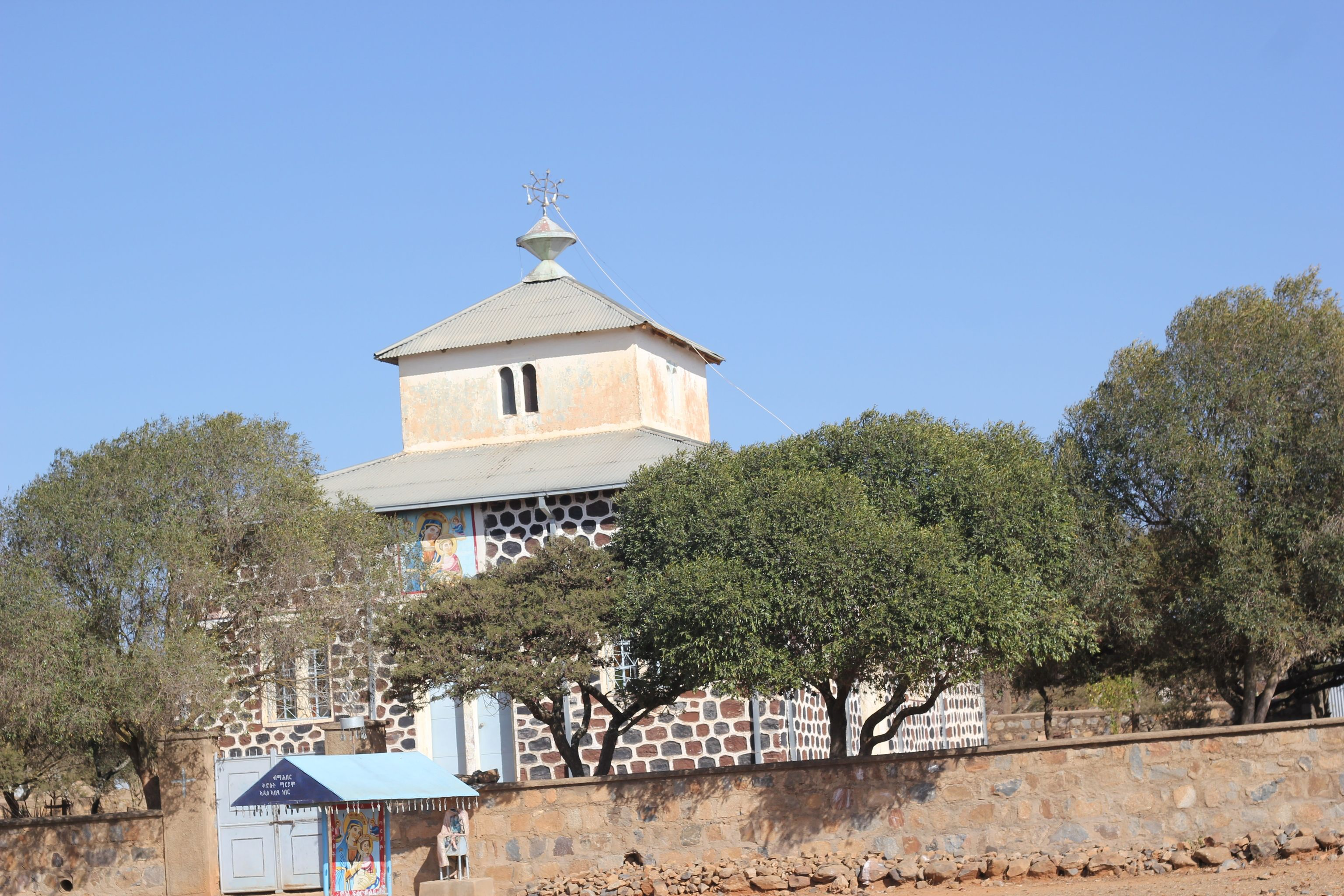
AdiBakel/Residents

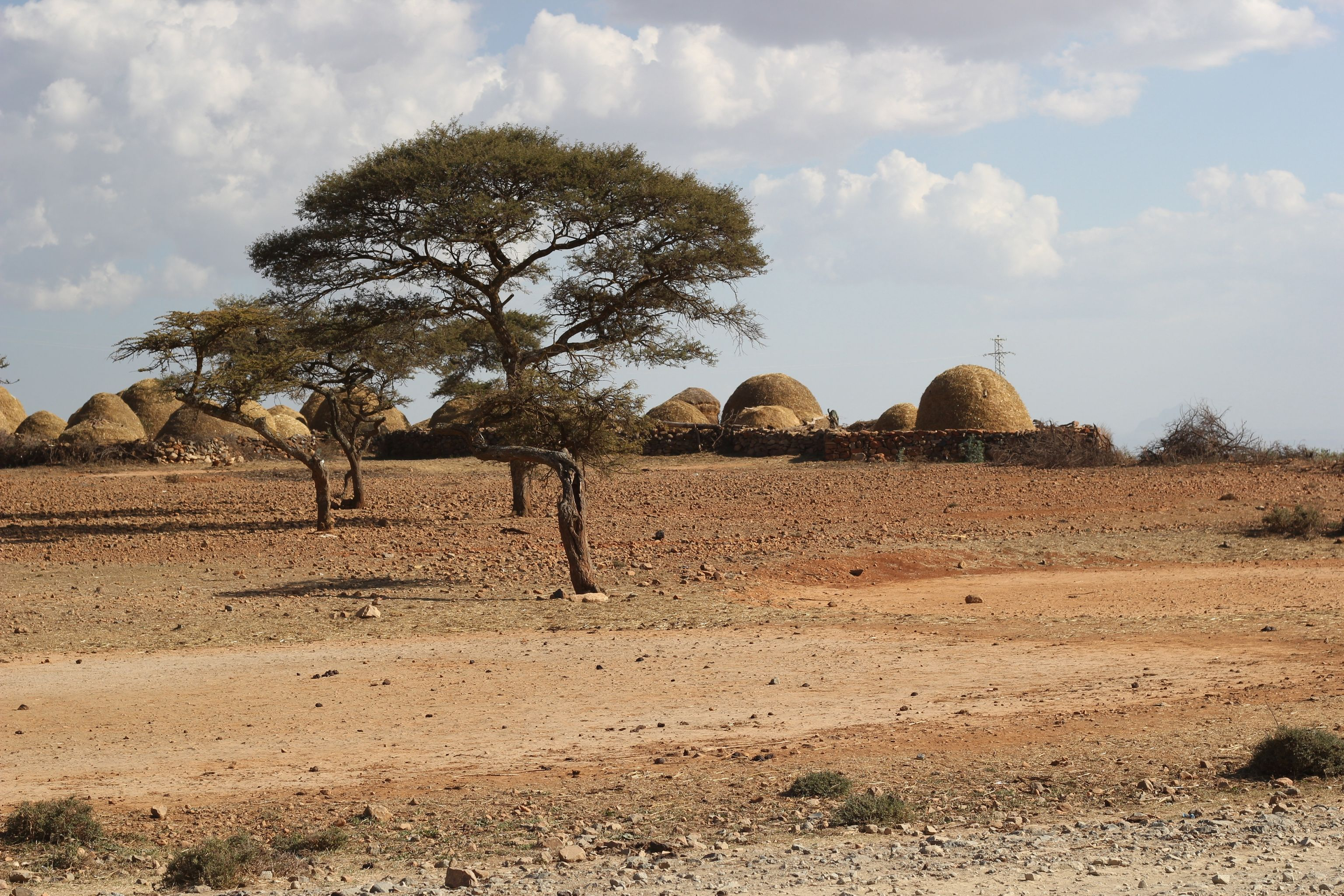
AdiBakel/Residents

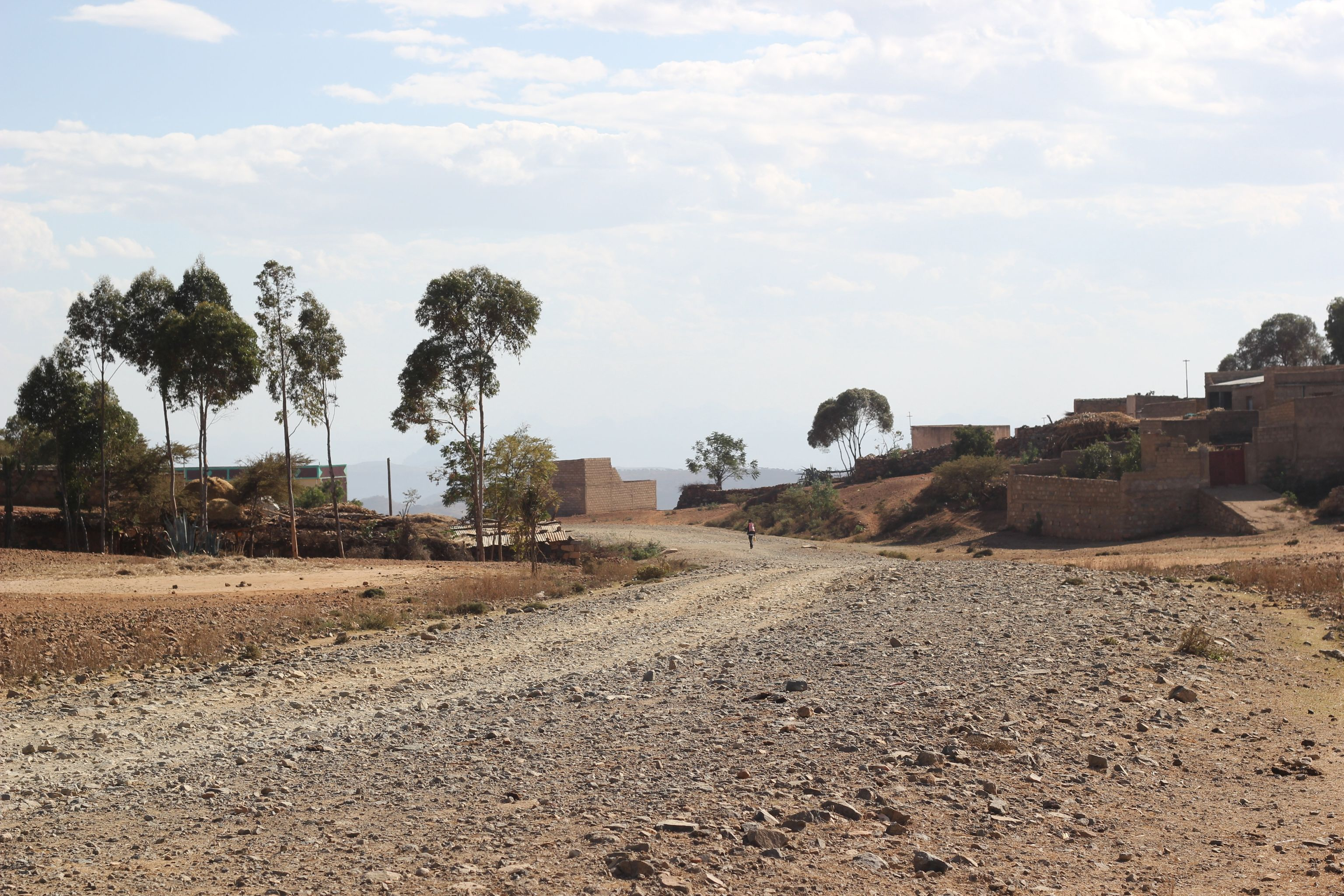
AdiBakel/Residents

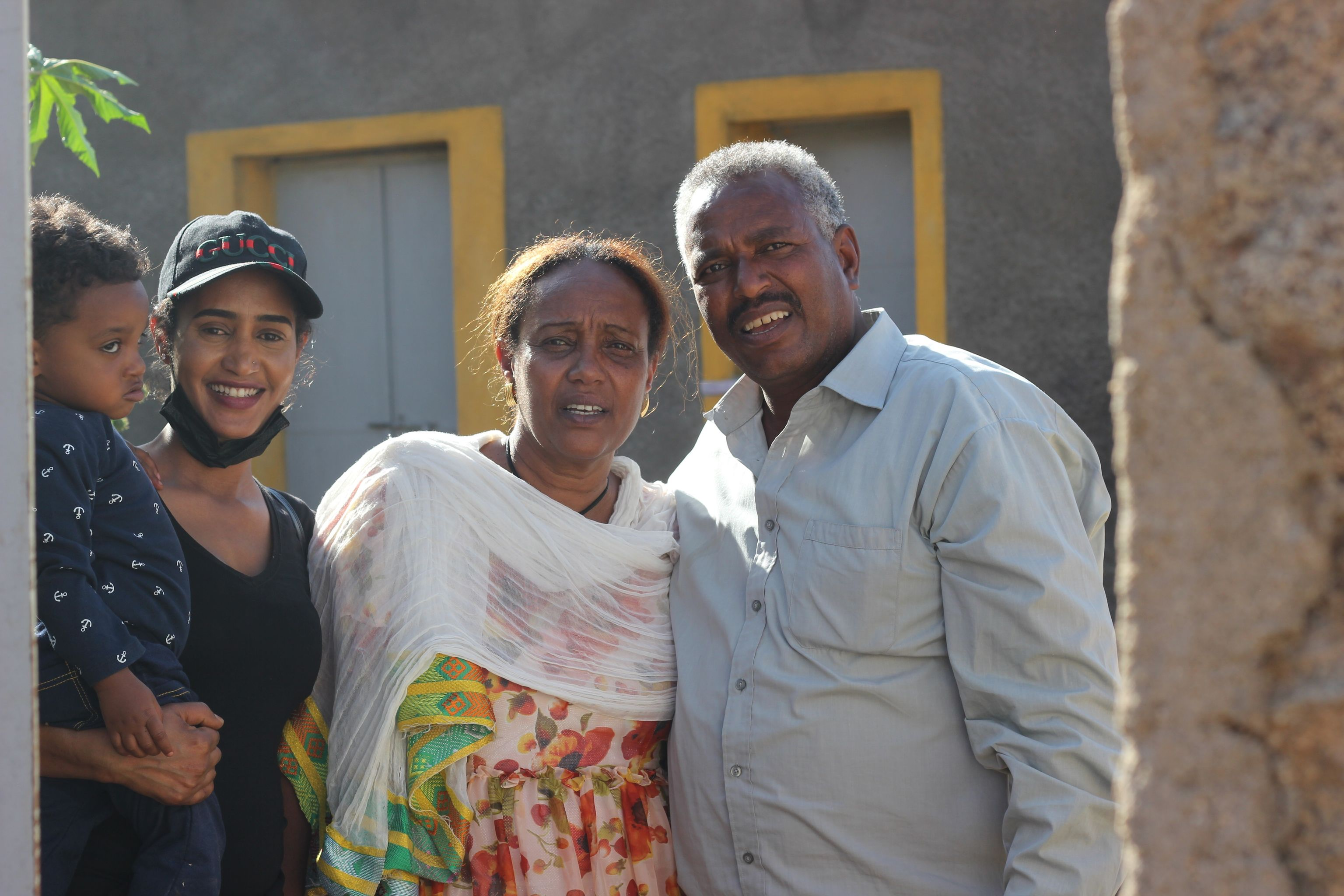
AdiBakel/Residents

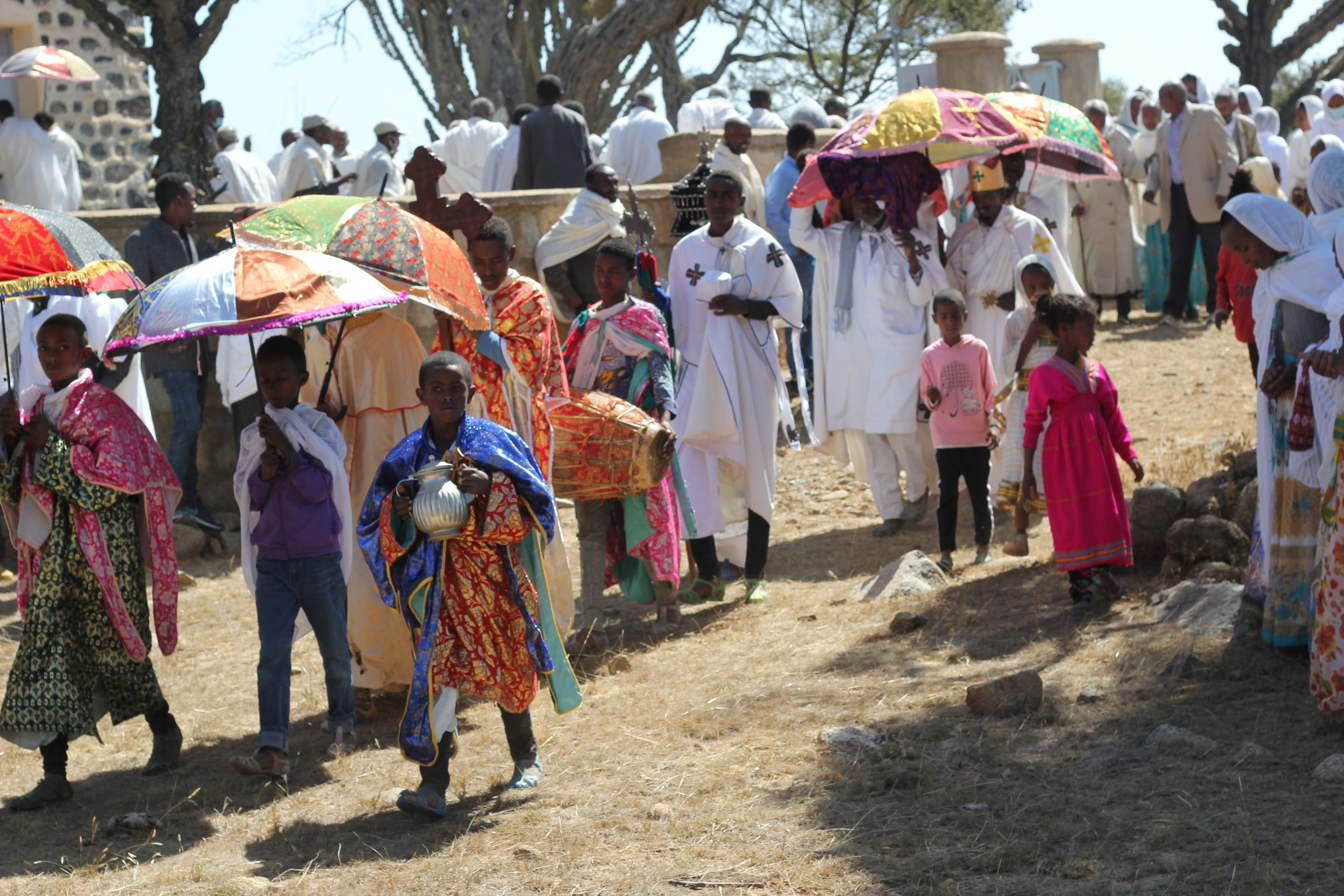
AdiBakel/Residents

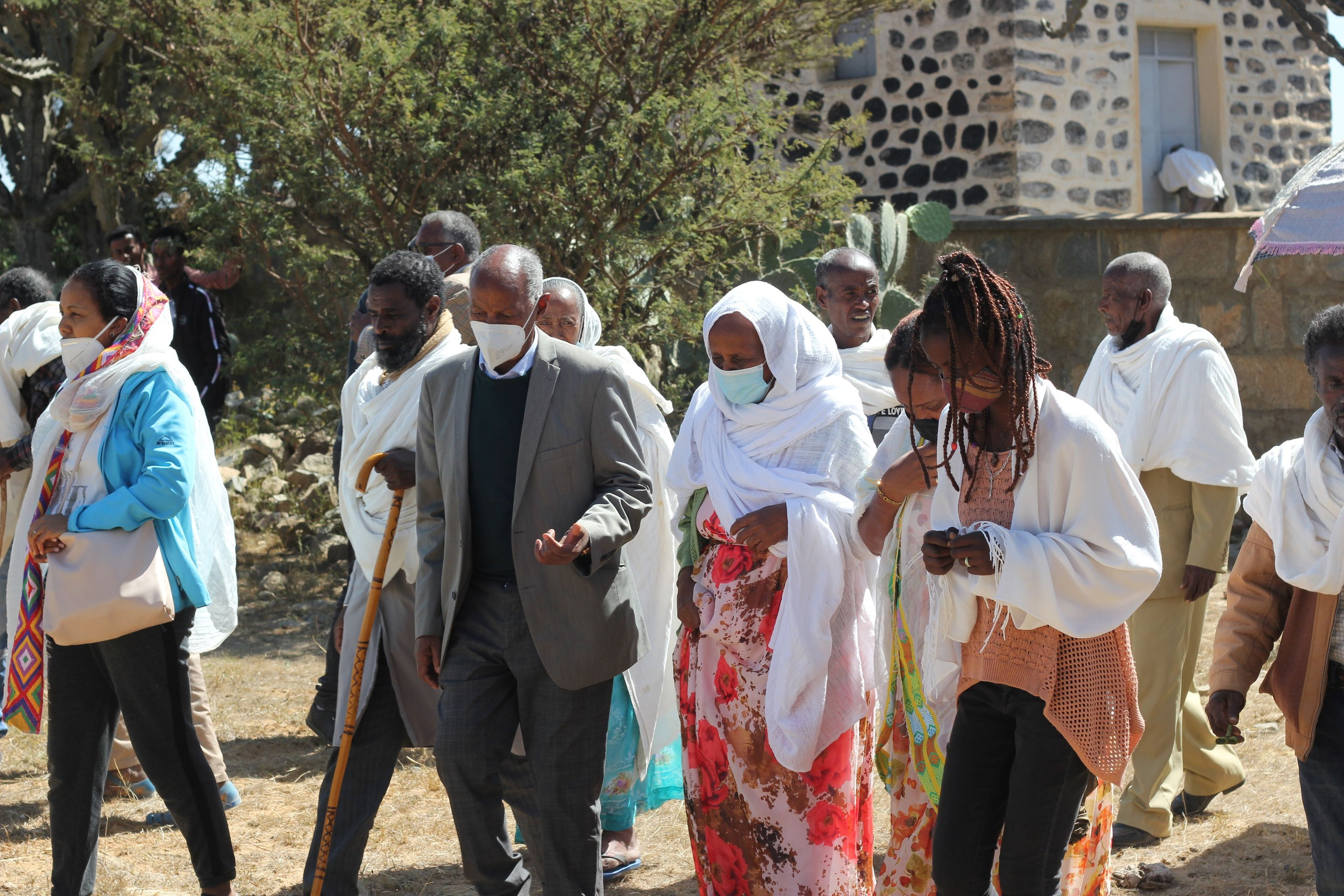
AdiBakel/Residents

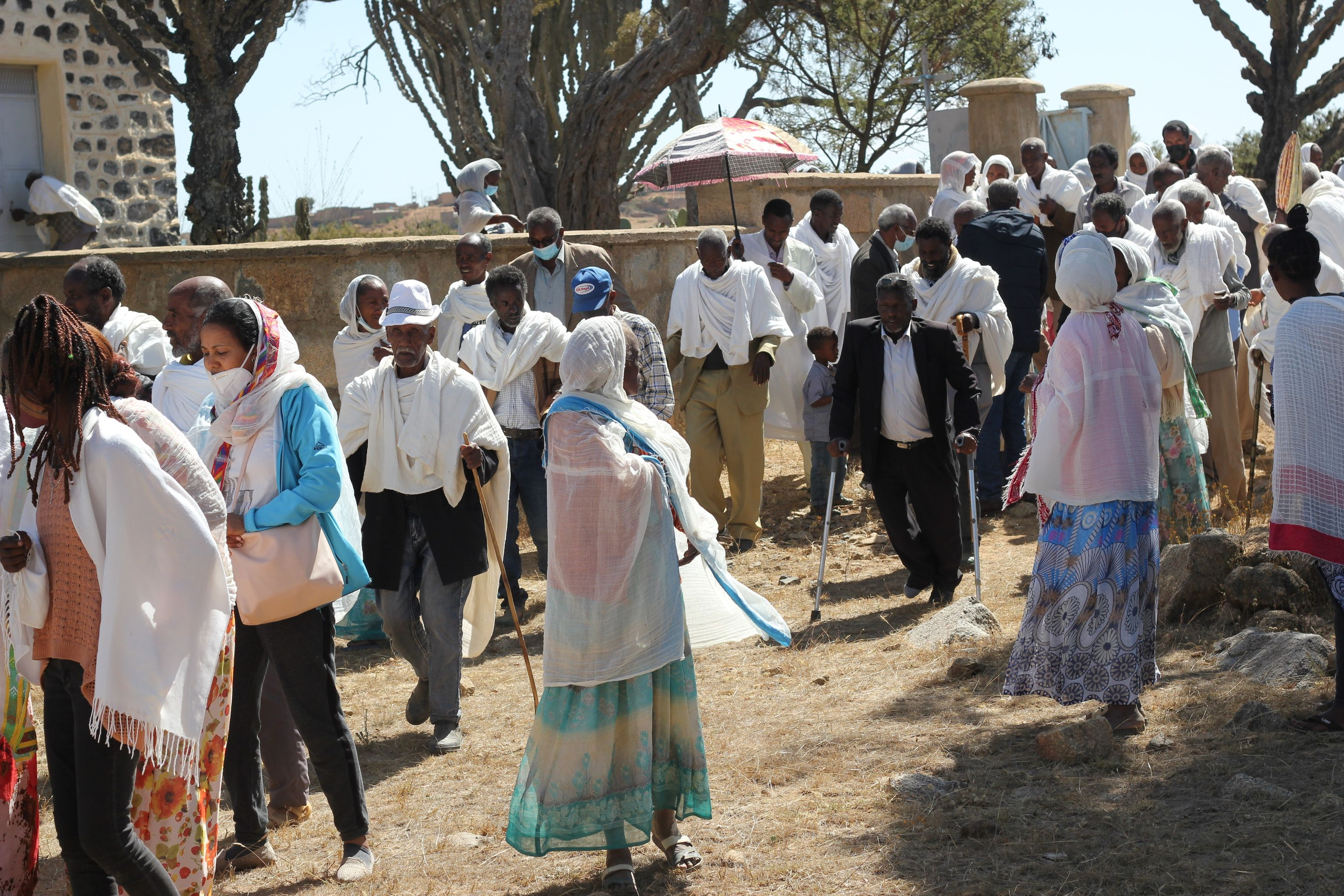
AdiBakel/Residents

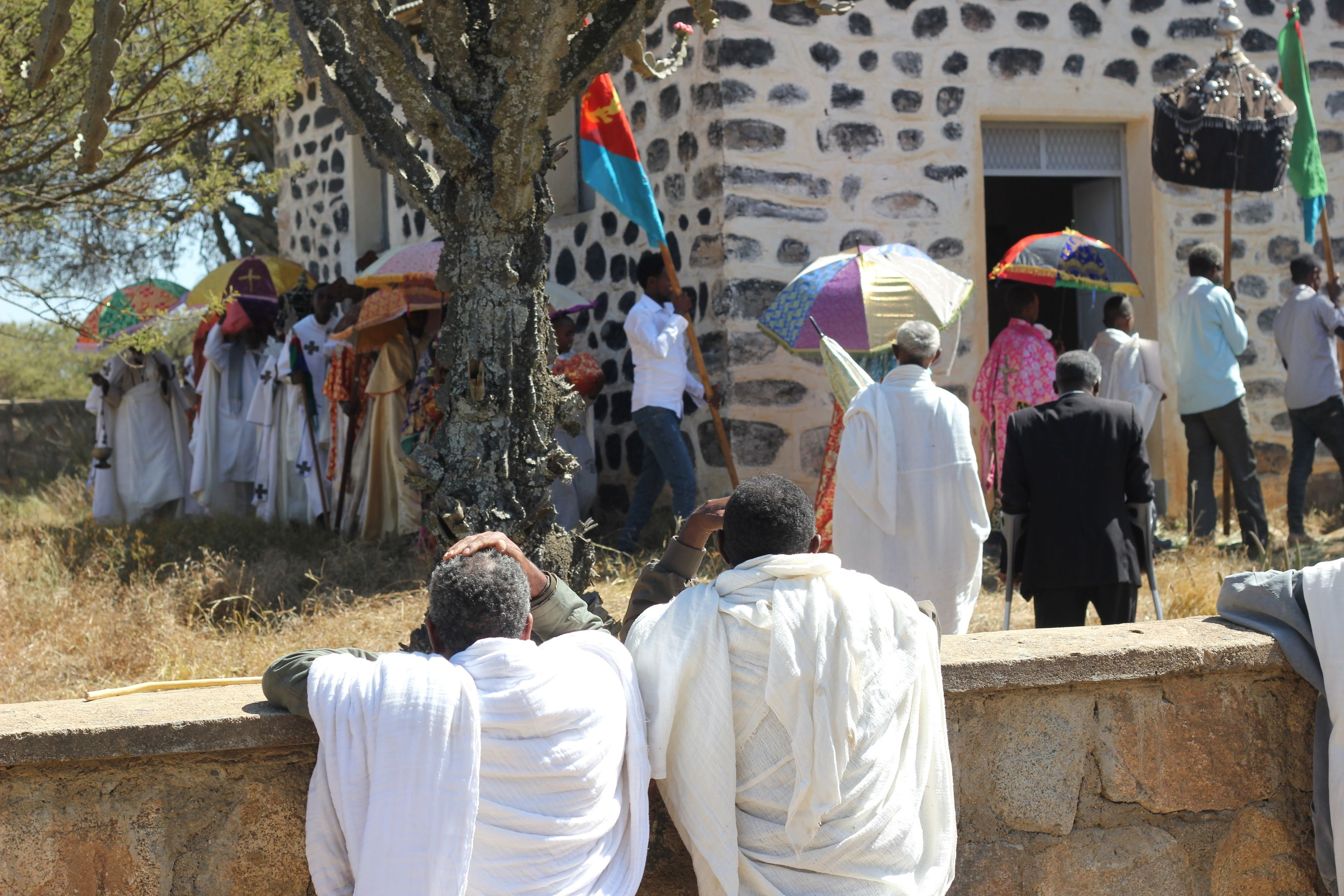
AdiBakel/Residents

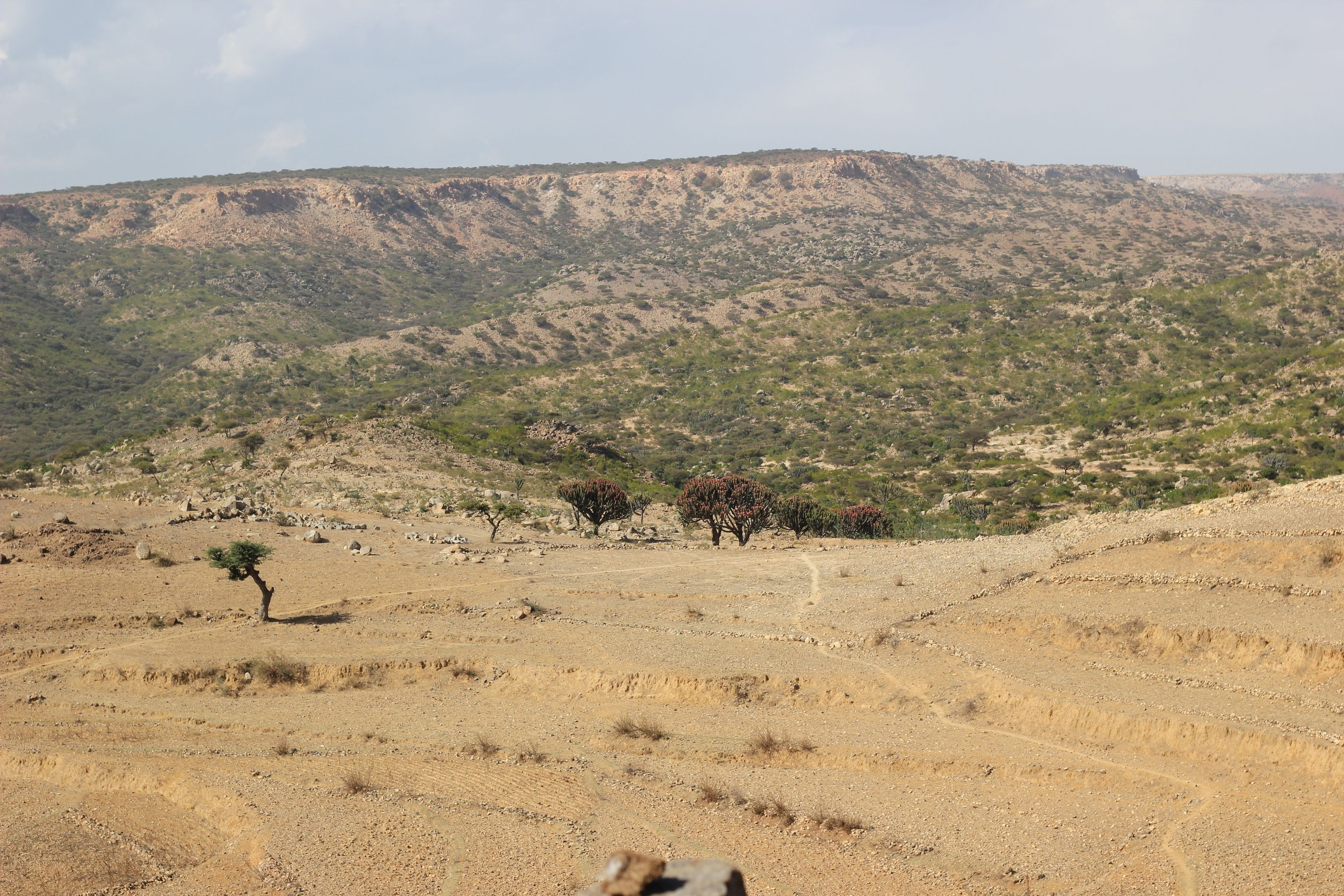
AdiBakel/Residents

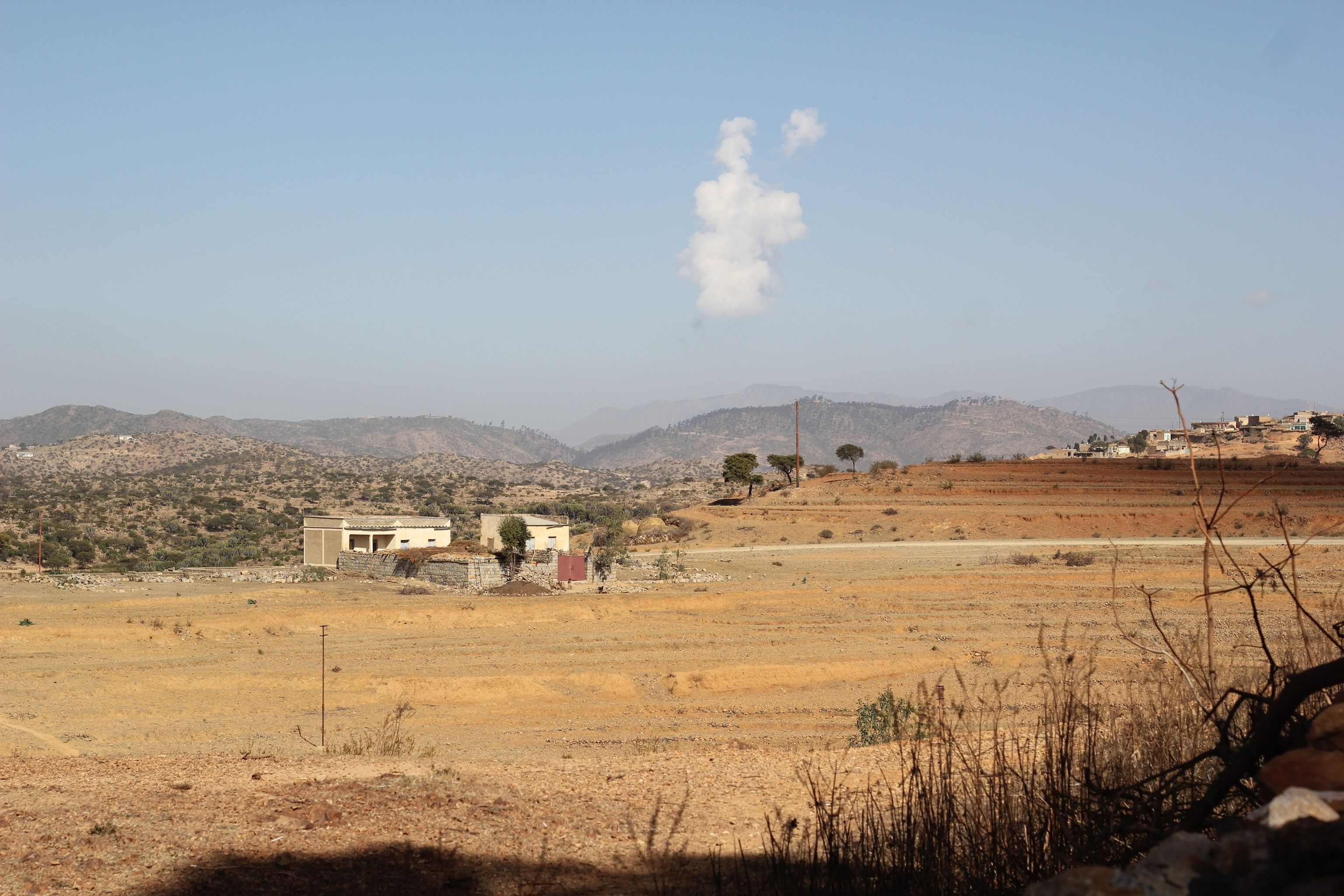
AdiBakel/Residents

== Location ==
The village lies at an elevation of 2092 metres above sea level. It is located about 18 km southwest of Dekemhare, 11 km northwest of Segheneyti and 55 km south of the capital Asmara, which is partly on a gentle slope and the other part on a level. Adi Bakel lies between Dekemhare and Segheneyti.

== History ==
The inhabitants of the four villages Maereba, Adi Bakel, Adi Keyih and Adi Abuur are the sons and daughters of Hadgay, so the progenitor is called Hadgay. More precisely, Hubo, the son of Hadgay had 5 boys named Tearezghi, Tesfazghi, Meharezghi, Tsegazghi and Ngadazghi. Tearezghi is the progenitor of Adi Bakel's Resident. The inhabitants of Adi Bakel originally come from the village of Mareeba. Adi Bakel is divided into four districts or tribes, the four tribes are called Inda Gebrekrstos, Inda Bahamenet (Inda Okbakristos and Inda Andu belong to Inda Bahamenet), Inda Halies (there are not many, Inda Demshash belong to Inda Halies) and Inda Kelit (the first Residents of Adi Bakel, who emigrated from Maereba and discovered Adi Bakel).

== Popular places ==
Inda Dio is a popular place in Adi Bakel, which is west of St. Mary's Church. The residents of Adi Bakel describe Inda Dio as beautiful . For the residents of Adi Bakel, Indadio is and was a place of love, laughter, games (especially football games), and peace. This area attracts young people and children for playing soccer.

== Economy ==
The inhabitants live mainly from agriculture.

== See also ==
- Human Rights Concern Eritrea
