= Adi-Ada =

Coordinates: 14°50′N 38°52′E

- Village
- Interactive map of Adi-Ada
- Country: Eritrea
- Region: Debub Region
- Established: 1600

Population
  - Estimate: 1,500

Adi-Ada/:ትግርኛ/ዓዲ ዓዳ is a village of the former historical province of Seraye, which is located 7 km southeast to the city of Mendefera in present Southern Region of the state of Eritrea. The village has an age of at least 500 years, which is composed of four families called Enda Tesfit, Enda Nayzgi, Enda Oqubay and Enda Andeyohanness who are founding fathers of the village Adi-Ada which has more than 300 households and an estimated population of 1,500 people.

Villages around Adi-Ada are Debezana, Mado, Adi-Bardi, Mefalso, Egrimekel, Adewehaza, Zban ona, Kudofelasi and Deranto which all villages belongs to Tekela (ተኸላ).The village is one of the major agricultural and animal products provider of Mendefera City.Agricultural irrigation systems were begun during the Italian colonization period and that's why many farming places of the village acquired Italian names.

The people of Adi-Ada are Christians who are followers of the Eritrean Orthodox church, Saint Micheal (እንዳ ሚካኤል) church was there hundreds years before. Now the village built additional Trinity (እንዳ ስላሴ) church on a small hill called Kurba wedi gede (ኩሩባ ወዲ ገደ) and while digging the ground at the hill they found an old traditional instruments such as water pots and is now in a museum in Asmara for extra studies as it mentioned by the national Media Eri-TV.
