= Areza =

Areza ዓረዛ
- Town
- Location in Eritrea.
- Coordinates: 14°55′29″N 38°33′55″E
- Country: Eritrea
- Region: Debub
- Subregion: Areza
- Elevation: 2,044 m (6,706 ft)
- Time zone: UTC+3 (EAT)

Areza (Tigrinya: ዓረዛ) is a town in the Debub (Southern) region of Eritrea. It is the capital of the Areza subregion. It lies to the west of Mendefera. The area is primarily agricultural and contains 20 kebabis (residential areas).

== History ==
During the 18th century, the hereditary chiefs (Shum-Gulti) of Deqi Tesfa ruled from Areza. They faced much opposition during the 19th century from the Seraye. During the reigns of Emperors Tewodros II and Yohannes IV, the chiefs sought to enhance their authority by forming family alliances through marriage with the Tsazzega and the Hazzega. However, by the 1880s they lost control to the Ras Alula and sided with the Italians, who established a colonial post at Areza in 1890. The town grew in regional importance in the 1940s when the building of a dirt road to Barentu saw it develop as a market town.

Tension mounted in the region in the 1960s and 1970s with the establishment of the Eritrean Liberation Front (ELF). They eventually liberated the town from the Ethiopian authorities in 1977 until July 1978 until recaptured and appointed as a military post by the Derg. The Eritrean People's Liberation Front (EPLF) occupied the vicinity in the 1980s, and in June 1981, the first of a series of battles took place in the area, particularly near Mai Numa and along the road to Tokombia.

The initial fighting took place in the Areza area during Ethiopia's May 2000 offensive, especially around the well-guarded village of Adi Nifas and the town of Mai Dima.
