= Kudo Be'ur =

Kudo Be'ur( there is no sub region called by this name In Eritrea) كودو بعر
- Town
- Country: Eritrea
- Region: Debub
- District: Kudo Be'ur
- Time zone: UTC+3 (EAT)

Kudo Be'ur (Arabic: كودو بعر) is a town in Eritrea. It is located in the Debub (Southern) region and is the capital of the Kudo Be'ur district.
