= Kudo Be'ur subregion =

Coordinates: 14.7233°N 38.7319°E

Kudo Be'ur
- Subregion
- Interactive map of Kudo Be'ur
- Country: Eritrea
- Region: Debub
- Capital: Kudo Be'ur
- Time zone: UTC+3 (GMT +3)

Kudo Be'ur subregion is a subregion in the Debub (Southern) region (Zoba Debub) of Eritrea. Its capital lies at Kudo Be'ur.
