= Afabet =

Afabet افعبت
- Town
- Location in Eritrea
- Coordinates: 16°11′N 38°41′E
- Country: Eritrea
- Region: Northern Red Sea
- District: Afabet

Afabet (Tigrinya: ኣፍዓበት) is a town in northern Eritrea.

== Overview ==
Afabet is the capital of the Afabet district.

It is the site of the Battle of Afabet, which took place during the Eritrean War of Independence. The city is still surrounded by trenches, but has been largely rebuilt.
