= Serejeka =

Serejeka سيريجاكا
- Town
- Location in Eritrea.
- Coordinates: 15°28′57″N 38°51′49″E
- Country: Eritrea
- Region: Maekel
- District: Serejaka
- Time zone: UTC+3 (EAT)

Serejeka (Tigrinya: ሰረጀቓ) (Arabic: سيريجاكا) is a town in Eritrea. Located in the Maekel (Central) region, it is the capital of the Serejaka district.
