= Ghala Nefhi =

Town in Eritrea

Ghala Nefhi (Arabic: غلا نفي) is a town in Eritrea. It is located in the Maekel (Central) region and is the capital of Ghala Nefhi district.
