= Adi Quala =

Adi Quala ዓዲ ዃላ
- Town
- Location in Eritrea
- Coordinates: 14°38′N 38°50′E
- Country: Eritrea
- Region: Debub
- District: Adi Quala

Government
- Elevation: 2,049 m (6,722 ft)
- Climate: Cwb

Adi Quala (Tigrinya: ዓዲ ዃላ,Tigrinya pronunciation: [ʕadi xʷala]) is a market town in southern (Debub) part of Eritrea. It is located 32 km south of Mendefera nearly 25 km from the Ethiopian border, over 2,000m above sea level.

== Overview ==
Adi Quala is known for its tukul (hut) church St Mary church with its frescoes and its mausoleum for the Italian Army soldiers who died at the Battle of Adwa and Gundet. The ossuary, on which the Italian flag flies, preserves the remains of three thousand six hundred forty-three fallen soldiers from the first African campaign. The granite obelisk, which dominates the war memorial, bears the inscription: "La Patria ai caduti di Adua 1° Marzo 1896". The town has a population of more than 30.000 people. The language spoken in the town of Adi Quala is Tigrinya. The population is predominantly more than 99% Tigrinya.

== Religion ==
Adi Quala's population are 95% Orthodox Christian and 5% are Muslims. There are some Roman Catholics and Protestants about 1% of the total population. There are two Orthodox churches, one Roman Catholic church and one mosque.

Writing in the 1890s, Augustus B. Wylde described the market in Adi Quala, held on Mondays, as medium in size.

== Climate ==
Climate data for Adi Quala
Month	Jan	Feb	Mar	Apr	May	Jun	Jul	Aug	Sep	Oct	Nov	Dec	Year
Mean daily maximum °C (°F)	26.4 (79.5)	27.3 (81.1)	29.3 (84.7)	29.0 (84.2)	28.6 (83.5)	27.6 (81.7)	22.9 (73.2)	22.4 (72.3)	25.9 (78.6)	26.6 (79.9)	26.2 (79.2)	25.6 (78.1)	26.5 (79.7)
Mean daily minimum °C (°F)	7.2 (45.0)	8.2 (46.8)	10.8 (51.4)	11.6 (52.9)	12.1 (53.8)	12.3 (54.1)	11.7 (53.1)	12.3 (54.1)	11.1 (52.0)	9.1 (48.4)	7.8 (46.0)	6.9 (44.4)	10.1 (50.2)
Average rainfall mm (inches)	0 (0)	3 (0.1)	9 (0.4)	28 (1.1)	40 (1.6)	68 (2.7)	224 (8.8)	198 (7.8)	57 (2.2)	11 (0.4)	12 (0.5)	2 (0.1)	652 (25.7)
Source: Climate-Data
