= Adi Keyh =

Adi Keih ዓዲ ቐይሕ
- Town
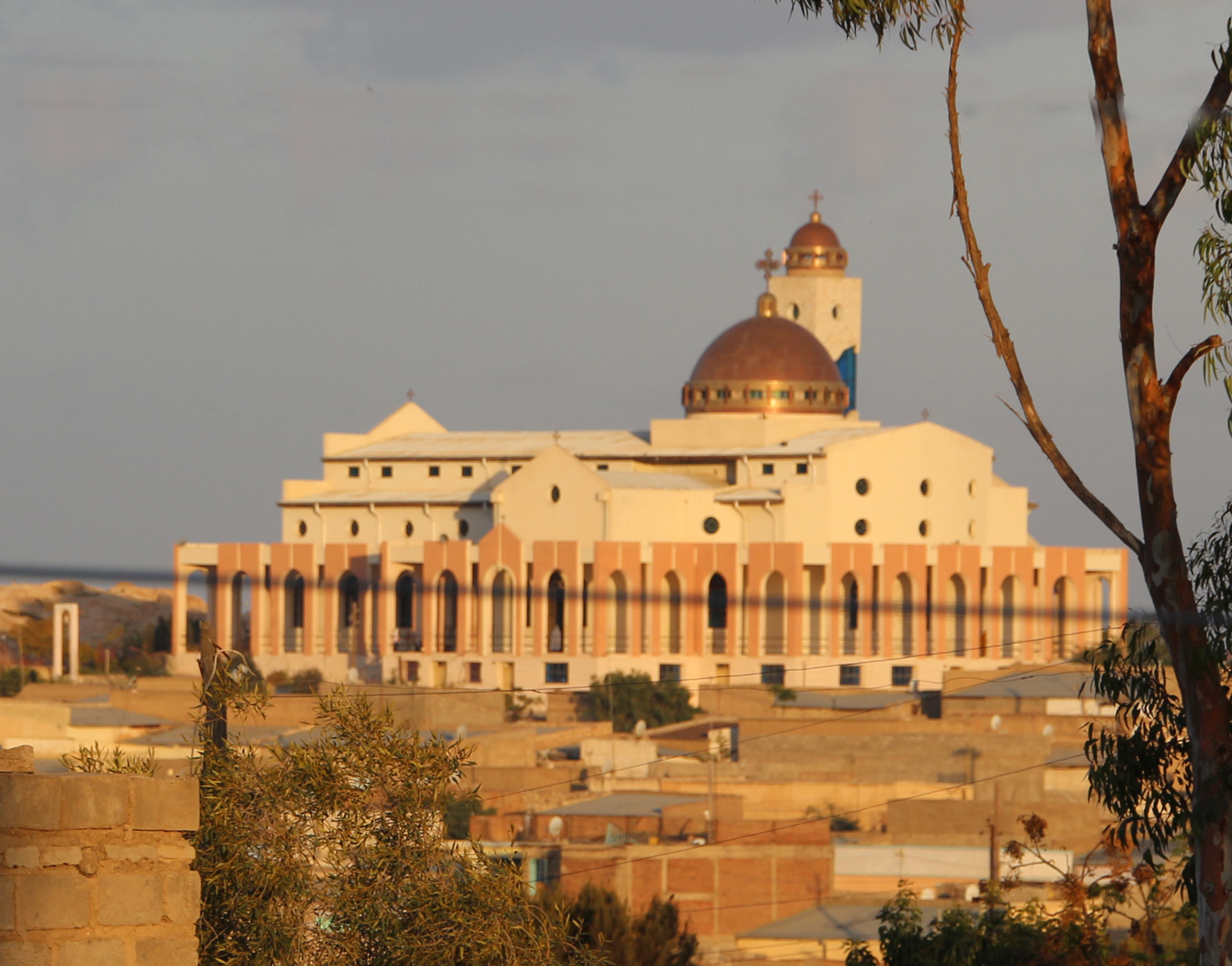
- St. George Church

- Location in Eritrea
- Coordinates: 14°50′N 39°22′E
- Country: Eritrea
- Region: Debub
- District: Adi Keyh District
- Elevation: 2,393 m (7,851 ft)

Population
  - Total: 25,000
- Climate: BSk

Adi Keyh (Tigrinya: ዓዲ ቐይሕ "Red Village"), is a market town in Eritrea, lying approximatively 110 kilometers southeast of Asmara. It lies almost 2,500 metres above sea level and has a population of around 40,000 people. They speak Tigrinya and Saho. The ruins of Qohaito and Toconda lie near the town. Eritrea's College of Science and Arts, which cost $17 million to construct, is located in Adi Keih.

Alternative spellings of its name include: Adi Caie, Addi Caieh, Adi Ciah, Adi Keih, Adi Qeyh, Adi Keyih and Adi Kaie.

== Notable people ==
- Yirgalem Fisseha Mebrahtu, poet

== See also ==
- List of highest towns by country
