= Senafe subregion =

Coordinates: 14°42′N 39°25′E

Senafe
- Subregion
- Interactive map of Senafe
- Country: Eritrea
- Region: Debub
- Capital: Senafe
- Time zone: UTC+3 (GMT +3)

Senafe subregion is a subregion of the Debub region (Zoba Debub) in southern Eritrea. Its capital is Senafe and high points include Emba Soira.

== Overview ==
Lying on the edge of the Ethiopian Highlands, the district is primarily inhabited by the Tigrinya and the Saho peoples.

Senafe is known for the ruins of Metera (also known as Balaw Kalaw) and the monolithic church of Enda-Tsadkan.
