= Adobha subregion =

Adobha
- Subregion
- Country: Eritrea
- Region: Northern Red Sea
- Time zone: UTC+3 (GMT +3)

Adobha subregion is a subregion in the Northern Red Sea region of Eritrea.
