= Lake Kulul =

- Location within Eritrea
- Coordinates: 14°23′N 40°21′E
- Country: Eritrea
- Region: Northern Red Sea Region
- Elevation: −75 m (−246 ft)
- Time zone: UTC+3 (EAT)

Lake Kulul is the lowest point in Eritrea, located in the Northern Red Sea Region. It lies in the Eritrean portion of the Danakil Depression at approximately 75 meters below sea level.
