= Muzahdorf =

Island in Eritrea

Muzahdorf is an island located in Dahlak, Eritrea. It surrounded by the waters of the Red Sea. Muzahdorf is also a part of Dahlak Marine Park. During the Eritrean–Ethiopian War the marine wildlife has been growing, which has beneficial for tourism in Eritrea. The park is protected by the Eritrean government.
