= Segeneiti =

Segheneytī ሰገነይቲ
- Location in Eritrea
- Coordinates: 15°03′10″N 39°11′14″E
- Country: Eritrea
- Region: Debub
- District: Segeneiti
- Elevation: 2,170 m (7,120 ft)
- Climate: BSk

Segheneytī (Tigrinya: ሰገነይቲ; sometimes anglicized as Segheneity and known also as Saganeiti, Seganeiti, Seganeyti, Segeleyti, Segeneyti, Segeneytī, Segheneiti) is a small town in the Southern Region of Eritrea. Segeneyti was the third largest settlement in the historical province of Akele Guzai, after Mendefera and Senafe.

Segheneyti is widely known in Eritrea for its production of Prickly pear cactus, which is locally known as Beles. The fruit was first introduced to the town by a priest in the 1950s. It is widely eaten as a snack and as fruit preserve. Large-scale production of the fruit has become more common in the area as it has both economic and health benefits. Segheneyti is located at the eastern escarpment of Eritrea which is suitable for the plant as it favours warm climate and rocky environment.

== Notable people ==
- Degiat Bahta Hagos - Eritrean nobleman and resistance fighter.
