= Mai-Aini subregion =

Mai-Aini
- Subregion
- Country: Eritrea
- Region: Debub
- Time zone: UTC+3 (GMT +3)

Mai-Aini subregion is a subregion in the Debub region of Eritrea.
