= Adi Tekelezan =

Adi Tekelezan عدي تيكلزان Tekelezan the Father of three brothers, Teklehaymanot, Fremeka and Hibtay.
- Town
- Location in Eritrea
- Coordinates: 15°34′02″N 38°46′43″E
- Country: Eritrea
- Region: Anseba
- Subregion: Adi Tekelezan
- Elevation: 2,273 m (7,457 ft)

Population
  - Total: 15,000

Adi Tekelezan (in Tigrinya, ዓዲ ተከሌዛን in Tigre and Arabic, عدي تيكلزان) is a town in the Anseba region of Eritrea. It is the capital of the Adi Tekelezan subregion. It is located on the route between Asmara and Keren. Adi Tekelezan is 40 km away from Asmera. It is a local commercial center.

In World War II Italian forces retreated to Adi Tekelezan. They surrendered to British forces on 1 April 1941. This was part of the Battle of Keren, the greatest battle on African soil at that time.
