= Karura subregion =

Karura
- Subregion
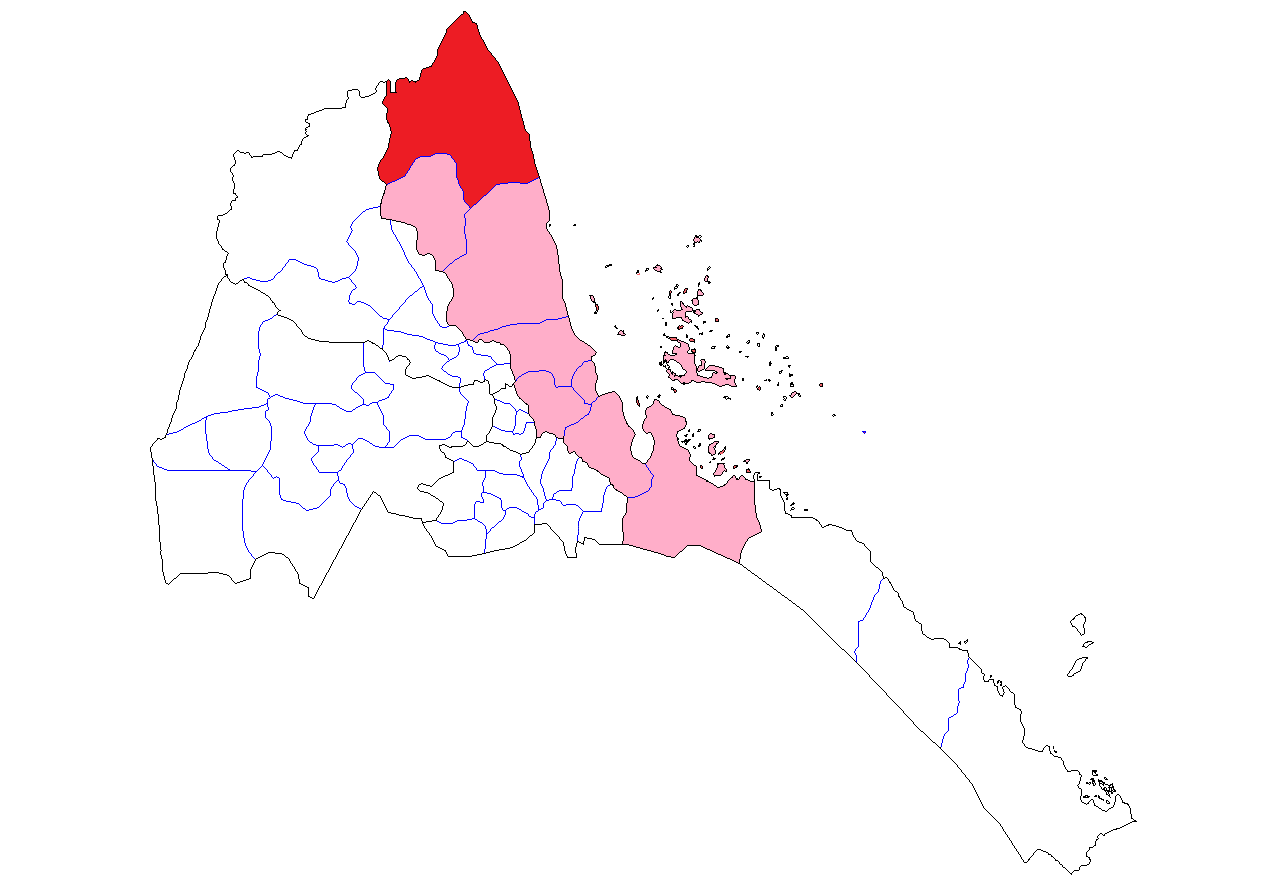
- Country: Eritrea
- Region: Northern Red Sea
- Capital: Karura
- Time zone: UTC+3 (GMT +3)

Karura subregion is a subregion in the Northern Red Sea region (Zoba Semienawi Keyih Bahri) of Eritrea. Its capital is at Karura.
