= Assab subregion =

Coordinates: 13°01′N 42°44′E

Assab
- Subregion
- Interactive map of Assab
- Country: Eritrea
- Region: Southern Red Sea
- Time zone: UTC+3 (GMT +3)

Assab subregion is a district in the Southern Red Sea region of Eritrea.
