= Adi Quala subregion =

Coordinates: 14.6364°N 38.8313°E

Adi Quala
- Subregion
- Interactive map of Adi Quala
- Country: Eritrea
- Region: Debub
- Capital: Adi Quala
- Time zone: UTC+3 (GMT +3)

Adi Quala subregion is a subregion in the southern Debub region (Zoba Debub) of Eritrea. Its capital lies at Adi Quala.
