= She'eb subregion =

She'eb
- Subregion
- Country: Eritrea
- Region: Northern Red Sea
- Capital: She'eb
- Time zone: UTC+3 (GMT +3)

She'eb subregion is a subregion in the Northern Red Sea region (Zoba Semienawi Keyih Bahri) of Eritrea. Its capital lies at She'eb.
