= Elabered subregion =

Coordinates: 15.7106°N 38.6286°E

Elabered
- Subregion
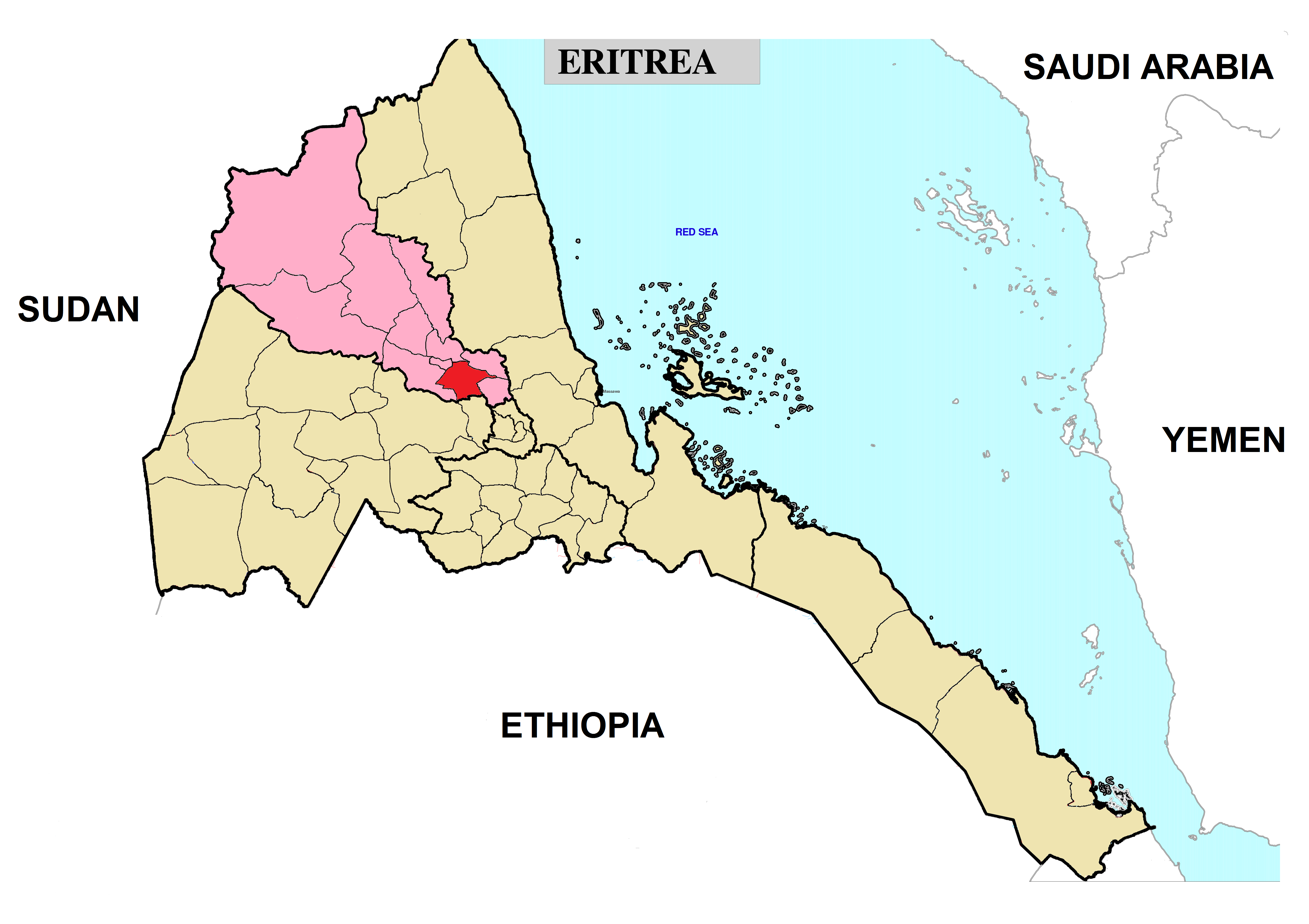
- Country: Eritrea
- Region: Anseba
- Capital: Elabered
- Time zone: UTC+3 (GMT +3)

Elabered subregion is a subregion in the northwestern Anseba region (Zoba Anseba) of Eritrea. Its capital lies at Elabered.
