= Geleb subregion =

Coordinates: 15.902895°N 38.269436°E

Geleb/Gheleb
- Subregion
- Gheleb
- Nickname: Haiget
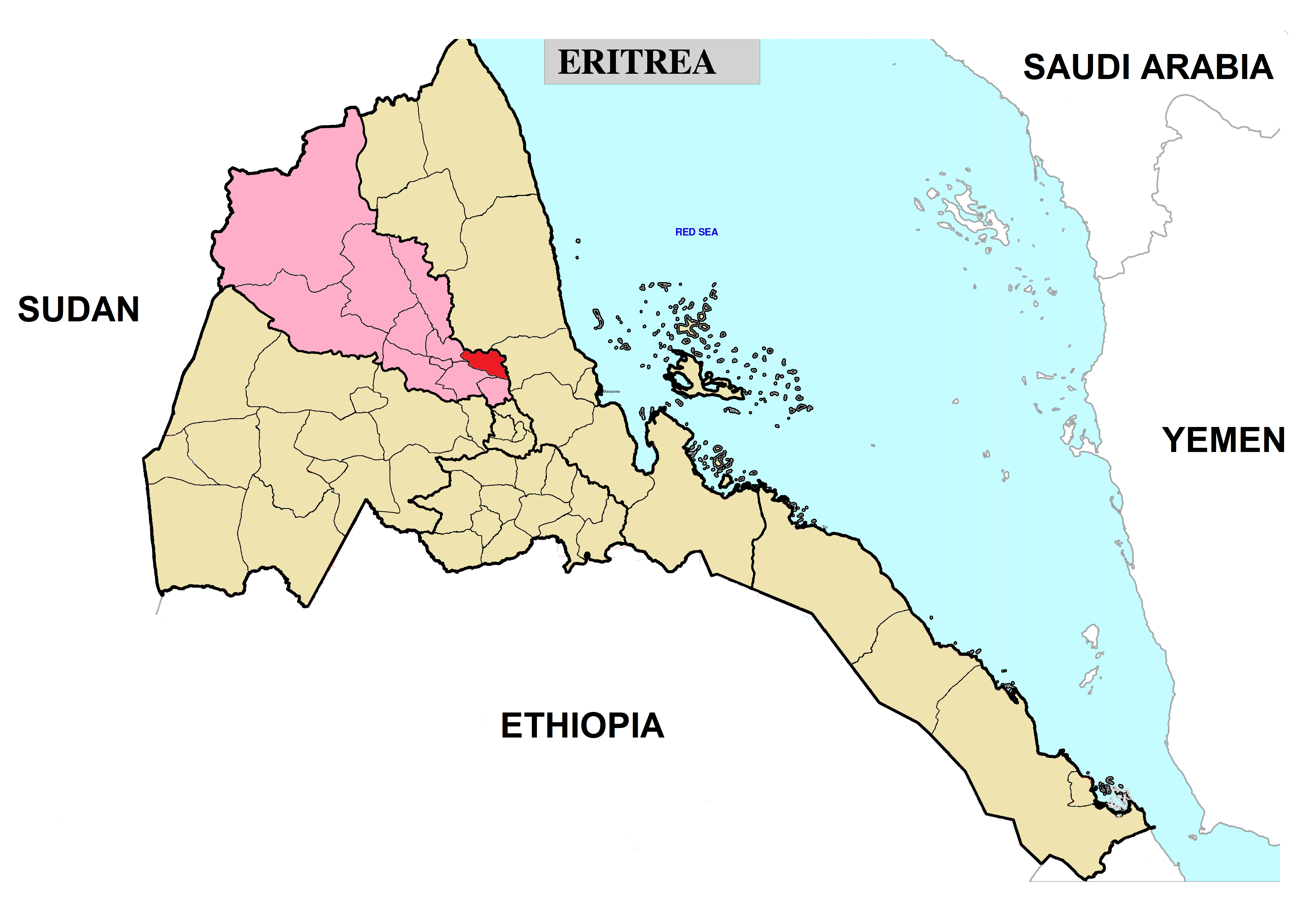
- Country: Eritrea
- Region: Anseba
- Capital: Geleb
- Time zone: UTC+3 (GMT +3)

Geleb subregion is a subregion in the northwestern Anseba region (Zoba Anseba) of Eritrea. Its capital lies at Geleb.

Geleb has 11 sub areas.
