= Mensura subregion =

Coordinates: 15.4752°N 38.2685°E

Mensura
- Subregion
- Interactive map of Mensura
- Country: Eritrea
- Region: Gash-Barka
- Capital: Mensura
- Time zone: UTC+3 (GMT +3)

Mensura subregion is a subregion in the Gash Barka region of western Eritrea. The capital lies at Mensura.
