= Adi Keyh subregion =

Coordinates: 14.8498°N 39.3720°E

- Subregion
- Interactive map of Adi Keyh subregion
- Country: Eritrea
- Region: Debub
- Capital: Adi Keyh
- Time zone: UTC+3 (GMT +3)

Adi Keyh subregion is a subregion in the Debub (Southern) region (Zoba Debub) of Eritrea. Its capital lies at Adi Keyh. Adi Keyh subregion is part of one of the most populated and agriculturally active regions in Eritrea. It is also close to important archaeological sites like Qohaito, which adds to its historical and tourism value.

== Villages in the Subregion ==
- Semdi
