= Serejaka subregion =

Coordinates: 15°43′19″N 38°53′06″E

Serejaka
- Subregion
- Interactive map of Serejaka
- Country: Eritrea
- Region: Maekel
- Time zone: UTC+3 (GMT +3)

Serejaka subregion is a subregion in the central Maekel region (Zoba Maekel) of Eritrea. Its capital lies at Serejaka.
