= Tserona subregion =

Subregion of the Southern region of Eritrea

Coordinates: 14.621281°N 39.194981°E

Tsorona ጾሮና Atkaro
- Subregion
- Interactive map of Tsorona
- Country: Eritrea
- Region: Southern

Tserona or Tsorona (Ge'ez: ጾሮና) is a subregion of the Southern region of Eritrea, with a town of the same name serving as its capital. The area's old, Saho name was Atkaro or Hazamo. It was a major battle zone during the Eritrean-Ethiopian War (1998–2000).

== History ==
Tserona was a major front during the Eritrean–Ethiopian War of 1998–2000. In 2016, the Battle of Tsorona occurred, part of the Eritrean–Ethiopian border conflict.

== Geography ==
The parts of Tserona near the border with Ethiopia are mountainous. There is a border crossing between Tserona and Gerhu Sirnau in Ethiopia.

== Demographics ==
Ten thousand people lived in Tserona town as of 2011. Three main ethnic groups live in the area, from most populous to least: the Tigrinya, the Saho, and the Tigre. The first group lives in much of the subregion, while the last group lives in and around the town of Tserona.
