= Segheneyti subregion =

Segheneyti
- Subregion
- Country: Eritrea
- Region: Debub
- Capital: Segheneyti
- Time zone: UTC+3 (GMT +3)

Segheneyti subregion is a subregion in the Debub (Southern) region (Zoba Debub) of Eritrea. Its capital lies at Segheneyti.
