= Dekemhare subregion =

Coordinates: 15°04′N 39°02′E

Dekemhare
- Subregion
- Interactive map of Dekemhare
- Country: Eritrea
- Region: Debub
- Time zone: UTC+3 (GMT +3)

Dekemhare subregion is a subregion in the southern Debub region (Zoba Debub) of Eritrea. Its capital lies at Dekemhare.
