= Ghala Nefhi subregion =

Coordinates: 15°14′58″N 38°47′03″E

Ghala Nefhi
- Subregion
- Interactive map of Ghala Nefhi
- Country: Eritrea
- Region: Maekel
- Capital: Ghala Nefhi
- Time zone: UTC+3 (GMT +3)

Ghala Nefhi subregion is a subregion in the central Maekel region (Zoba Maekel) of Eritrea. Its capital lies at Ghala Nefhi.
