= Habero subregion =

Coordinates: 16°16′30″N 38°24′00″E

Habero
- Subregion
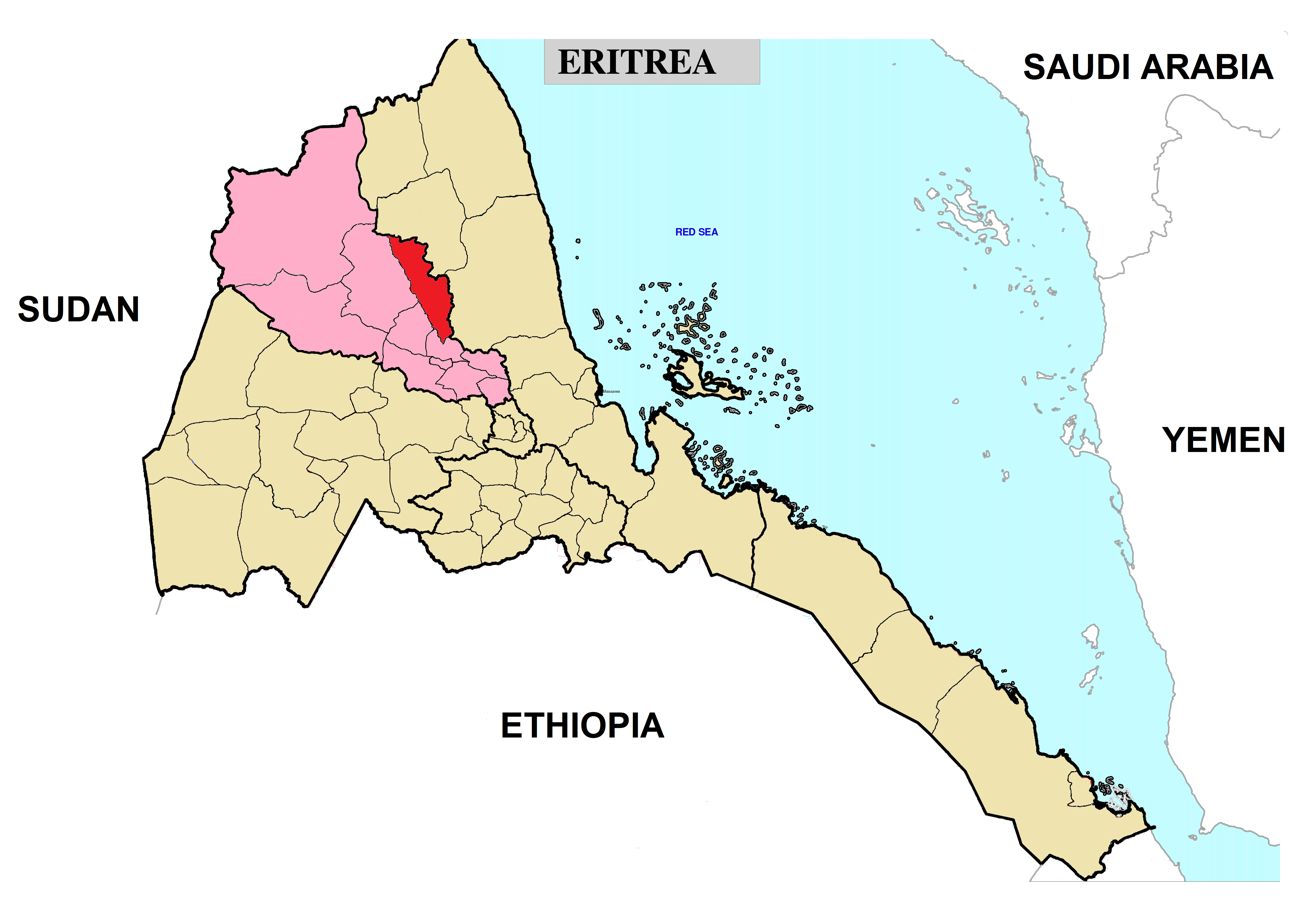
- Country: Eritrea
- Region: Anseba
- Capital: Habero
- Time zone: UTC+3 (GMT +3)

Habero subregion (in Tigrinya: ሓበሮ) is a subregion in the northwestern Anseba region (Zoba Anseba) of Eritrea. Its capital lies at Habero.
