= North Eastern subregion =

Coordinates: 15°29′06″N 38°53′53″E

North Eastern
- Subregion
- Interactive map of North Eastern
- Country: Eritrea
- Region: Maekel
- Time zone: UTC+3 (GMT +3)

North Eastern subregion is a subregion in the central Maekel region (Zoba Maekel) of Eritrea.
