= Areza subregion =

Coordinates: 14.9248°N 38.5640°E

Areza
- Subregion
- Interactive map of Areza
- Country: Eritrea
- Region: Debub
- Capital: Areza
- Time zone: UTC+3 (GMT +3)

Areza subregion is a subregion in the Debub (Southern) region of Eritrea. Its capital lies at Areza.
