= Massawa subregion =

Coordinates: 15°36′33″N 39°26′43″E

Massawa
- Subregion
- Interactive map of Massawa
- Country: Eritrea
- Region: Northern Red Sea
- Capital: Massawa
- Time zone: UTC+3 (GMT +3)

Massawa subregion is a subregion in the Northern Red Sea region (Zoba Semienawi Keyih Bahri) of Eritrea. Its capital lies at Massawa.

== History ==
The district has been one of strategical importance for centuries. The area and the port of Massawa were ruled by a succession of polities, including the Axumite Empire, Umayyad Caliphate, Balaw Sultanate, Ottoman Empire, Egypt, Britain, Italy and Ethiopia, until Eritrea's independence in 1991. Massawa became the capital of Italian Eritrea, until this was moved to Asmara in 1900.
