= Barentu subregion =

Coordinates: 15.112°N 37.586°E

Barentu
- Subregion
- Interactive map of Barentu
- Country: Eritrea
- Region: Gash-Barka
- Capital: Barentu
- Time zone: UTC+3 (GMT +3)

Barentu subregion is a subregion in the Gash-Barka region of western Eritrea. The capital lies at Barentu.

== Towns and villages ==
- Barentu
- Tauda
- Alegada
- Dedda
- Augana
- Cona
- Daghilo
