= Asmat subregion =

Coordinates: 16.2498°N 38.0331°E

Asmat
- Subregion
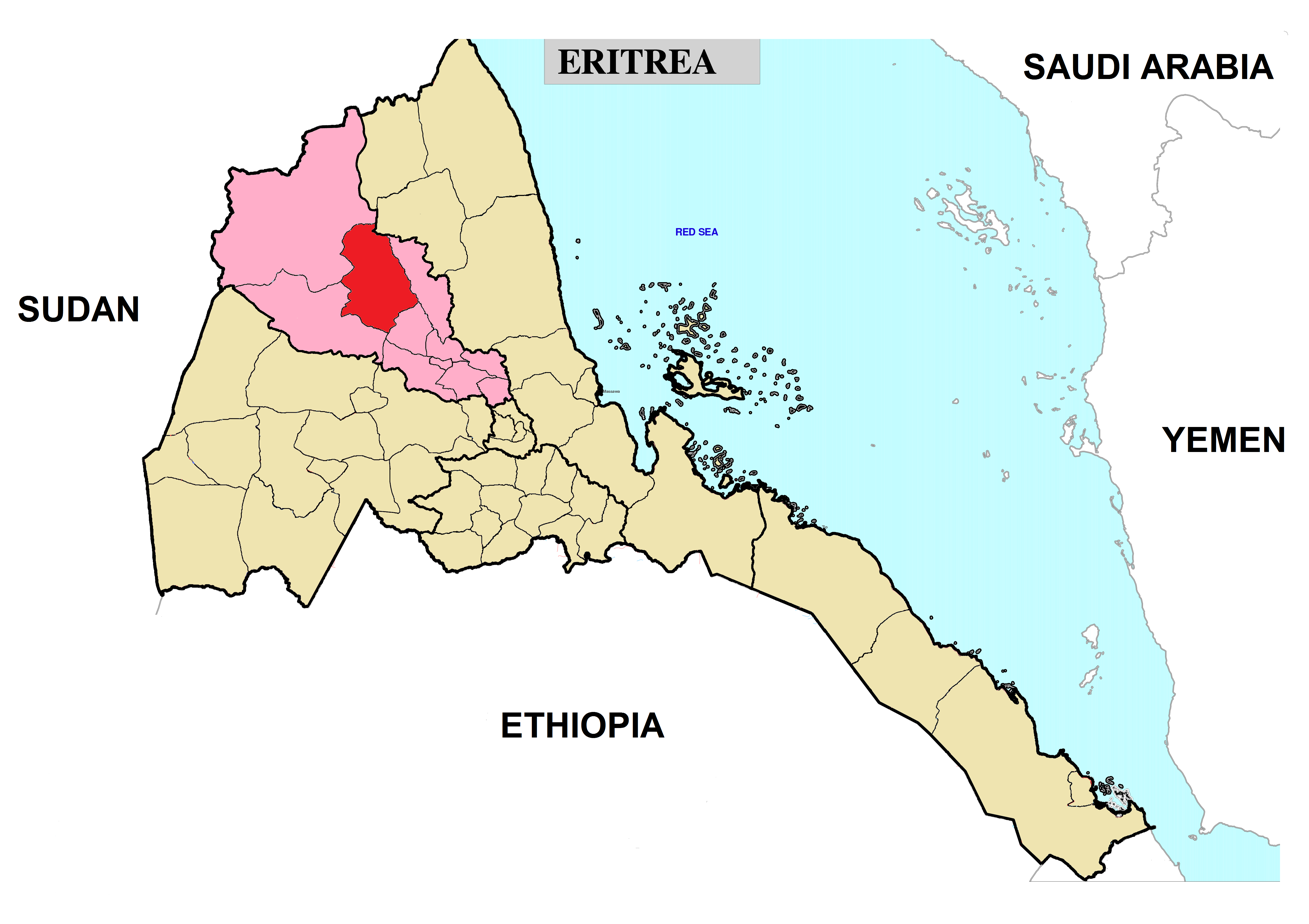
- Country: Eritrea
- Region: Anseba
- Capital: Asmat
- Time zone: UTC+3 (GMT +3)

Asmat subregion is a subregion in the northwestern Anseba region (Zoba Anseba) of Eritrea. Its capital lies at Asmat.
