= Afabet subregion =

Coordinates: 16.1833°N 38.6833°E

Afabet
- Subregion
- Interactive map of Afabet
- Country: Eritrea
- Region: Northern Red Sea
- Capital: Afabet
- Time zone: UTC+3 (GMT +3)

Afabet subregion is a subregion in the Northern Red Sea (Zoba Semienawi Keyih Bahri) region of Eritrea. Its capital lies at Afabet.
