= South Eastern subregion =

Coordinates: 15.271°N 38.997°E

South Eastern
- Subregion
- Interactive map of South Eastern
- Country: Eritrea
- Region: Maekel
- Time zone: UTC+3 (GMT +3)

South Eastern subregion is a subregion in the central Maekel (Maakel) region (Zoba Maekel) of Eritrea.
