= South Western subregion =

Coordinates: 15.205°N 38.832°E

South Western
- Subregion
- Interactive map of South Western
- Country: Eritrea
- Region: Maekel
- Time zone: UTC+3 (GMT +3)

South Western subregion is a subregion in the central Maekel region (Zoba Maekel) of Eritrea.
