= Dahlak subregion =

Coordinates: 15°50′N 40°12′E

Dahlak
- Subregion
- Interactive map of Dahlak
- Country: Eritrea
- Region: Northern Red Sea
- Capital: Jimhil

Area
  - Total: 900 km^{2} (350 sq mi)

Population
  - Total: 2,500
- Time zone: UTC+3 (GMT +3)

Dahlak subregion is a subregion in the Northern Red Sea region of Eritrea. It is the administrative subregion that covers the islands of the Dahlak Archipelago. The capital lies at Jimhil.

== Overview ==
Dahlak Subregion consists of two large and 124 small islands. Only four of the islands are permanently inhabited, of which Dahlak Kebir is the largest and most populated. The islands are a home for diverse marine life and sea-birds, and attract some tourists.

The archipelago's inhabitants speak Dahlik. Some of the islands can be reached by boat from Massawa.

Other inhabited islands of the district, besides Dahlak Kebir are: Dhuladhiya, Dissei, Dehil (Dohul), Erwa, Harat, Hermil, Isra-Tu, Nahaleg (Nahleg), Nora (Norah) and Shumma, although only Dissei, Dehil and Nora are permanently inhabited.

== Administrative Subdivision ==
Dhalak Subregion is administratively subdivided into eight villages:

1. Aranat
2. Cumbeiba
3. Debe'aluwa
4. Jimhil
5. Nokra
6. Port Smyth
7. Sahelia
8. Sceic Abdo Raama

== References Akrur Eritrea ==
- Subregions of Eritrea
