= Adi Tekelezan subregion =

Coordinates: 15.569311°N 38.776148°E

Adi Tekelezan
- Subregion
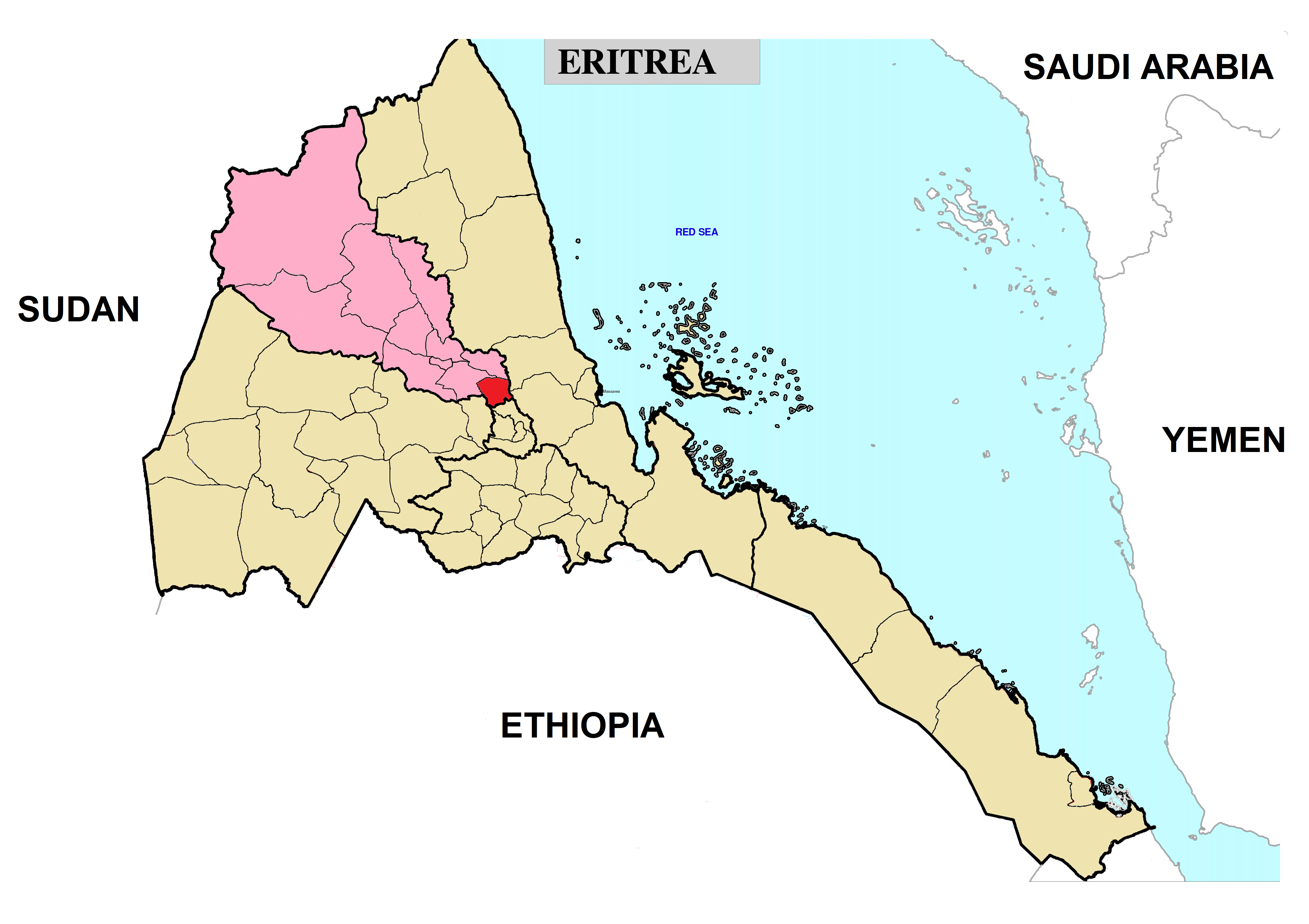
- Country: Eritrea
- Region: Anseba
- Capital: Adi Tekelezan
- Time zone: UTC+3 (GMT +3)

Adi Tekelezan subregion (Tigrinya:ንኡስ ዞባ ዓዲ ተከሌዛን) is a subregion in the northwestern Anseba region (Zoba Anseba) of Eritrea. The capital lies at Adi Tekelezan.
