= Hamelmalo subregion =

- Subregion
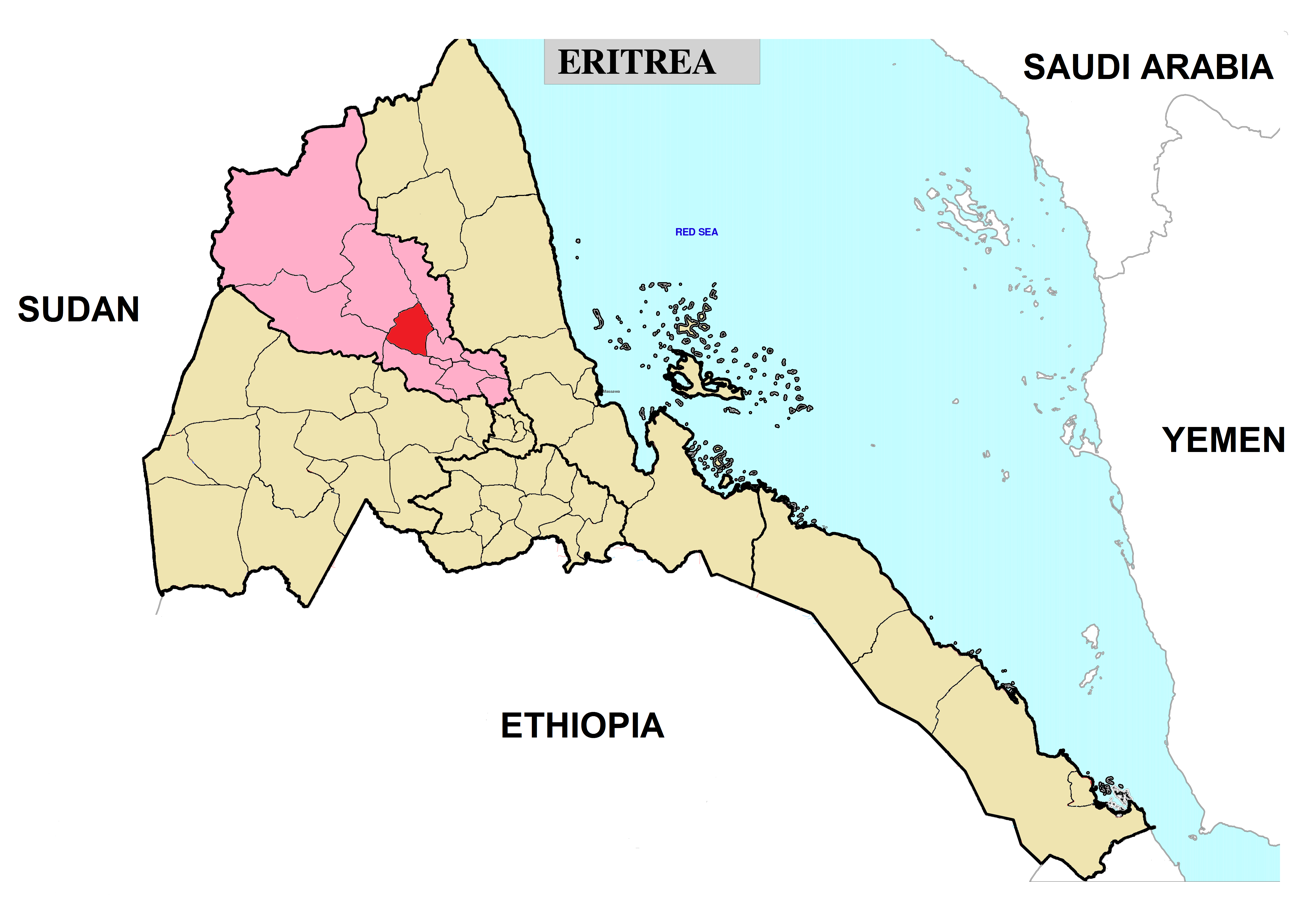
- Country: Eritrea
- Region: Anseba
- Time zone: UTC+3 (GMT +3)

Hamelmalo subregion (Hamel Malo subregion) is a subregion in the northwestern Anseba region (Zoba Anseba) of Eritrea.
