= Mendefera subregion =

Coordinates: 14°53′N 38°49′E

Mendefera
- Subregion
- Interactive map of Mendefera
- Country: Eritrea
- Region: Debub
- Capital: Mendefera
- Time zone: UTC+3 (GMT +3)

Mendefera subregion is a subregion in the Debub (Southern) region (Zoba Debub) of Eritrea. Its capital lies at Mendefera.
