= Upper Gash subregion =

Upper Gash
- Subregion
- Country: Eritrea
- Region: Gash-Barka
- Time zone: UTC+3 (GMT +3)

The Upper Gash subregion is a subregion in the Gash-Barka region (Zoba Gash-Barka) of western Eritrea.
