= Mai-Mne subregion =

Mai-Mine ቆሓይን ደቂ ጋንዛይን ደማስን (Tigrinya) Kohayn
- Subregion
- Mai mine
- Interactive map of Mai-Mine
- Country: Eritrea
- Region: Debub
- Established: 1880

Population
  - Total: 100.000
- Time zone: UTC+3 (GMT +3)

Location of the Mai-Mne Subregion of Eritrea.

The Mai-Mne (Tigrinya: ማይ-ምነ) Subregion of Eritrea is one of the Administrative divisions of Eritrea. It is located in the Debub Region, in the central part of the country. It is 100 km southwest of Asmara, the capital.

The climate is hot and arid. The average temperature is 26 °C. The warmest month is April, at 31 °C, and the coldest is August, at 20 °C. The average rainfall is 696 millimeters per year. The wettest month is August, with 200 millimeters of rain, and the driest is February, with 2 millimeters.

Mai-Mne Subregion

Climate chart (precipitation, max. and min. temperature)
J	F	M	A	M	J	J	A	S	O	N	D
4 34 16	2 38 17	11 41 18	65 42 20	50 41 21	59 33 17	176 25 14	200 23 16	82 29 16	32 36 19	13 36 18	2 34 19
- █ Average max. and min. temperatures in °C
- █ Precipitation totals in mm
Imperial conversion
J	F	M	A	M	J	J	A	S	O	N	D
0.2 93 61	0.1 100 63	0.4 106 64	2.6 108 68	2 106 70	2.3 91 63	6.9 77 57	7.9 73 61	3.2 84 61	1.3 97 66	0.5 97 64	0.1 93 66
- █ Average max. and min. temperatures in °F
- █ Precipitation totals in inches
