= Teseney subregion =

Coordinates: 15.1078°N 36.6561°E

Teseney
- Subregion
- Interactive map of Teseney
- Country: Eritrea
- Region: Gash-Barka
- Capital: Teseney
- Time zone: UTC+3 (GMT +3)

Teseney subregion is a subregion in the western Gash-Barka region (Zoba Gash-Barka) of Eritrea. Its capital lies at barentu .
