= List of Eritrean regions by Human Development Index =

This is a list of Eritrean regions by Human Development Index as of 2023.

Rank	Region	HDI (2023)
Medium human development
1	Central (Asmara)	0.690
Low human development
–	Eritrea	0.503
2	Southern Red Sea	0.503
3	Debub	0.478
4	Anseba	0.458
5	Northern Red Sea	0.408
6	Gash-Barka	0.377

== See also ==
- List of countries by Human Development Index
