= Akurdet subregion =

Coordinates: 15°33′N 37°53′E

Akurdet
- Subregion
- Interactive map of Akurdet
- Country: Eritrea
- Region: Gash-Barka
- Capital: Akurdet
- Time zone: UTC+3 (GMT +3)

Akurdet subregion is a subregion in the western Gash-Barka region (Zoba Gash-Barka) of Eritrea. Its capital lies at Akurdet.
