= Semhar =

Semhar is the name of a former province of Eritrea, which has now become almost incorporated into the Northern Red Sea Region when the number and names of provinces were unilaterally changed in 1996. The province was thinly settled with Massawa as the provincial capital. The population is mainly Tigre, Afar, Saho and Tigrinya. The Tigre and Tigrinya language are mainly spoken. The population is mainly pastoralist and agro-pastroalist.

It is a common name for Eritrean females and at times males as well. Semhar is also a city in Eritrea.
