= Debarwa subregion =

Coordinates: 15.0873°N 38.8334°E

Debarwa
- Subregion
- Interactive map of Debarwa
- Country: Eritrea
- Region: Debub (Southern)
- Capital: Debarwa
- Time zone: UTC+3 (GMT +3)

Debarwa subregion is a subregion in the southern Debub region (Zoba Debarwa) of Eritrea. Its capital lies at Debarwa.
