= Emba Soira =

Mountain in Eritrea

- እምባ ሶይራ
- Location within Eritrea

Highest point
- Elevation: 3,018 m (9,902 ft)
- Listing: Country high point
- Coordinates: 14°44′16″N 39°30′47″E

Geography
- Location: Debub Region, Eritrea
- Parent range: Eritrean Highlands

Emba Soira (also transliterated Soyra or Golo) is the highest mountain in Eritrea. Rising 3,018 metres (9,902 ft) above sea level, it is part of the Eritrean Highlands, one side of the Great Rift Valley which cuts through Eritrea and joins the Red Sea. The mountain is situated in the southeastern part of the Debub (Southern) administrative region in central Eritrea.

== Israeli military listening post ==
In mid-2016, press messages based on information from the Eritrean opposition suggested that Israel had completed the construction of a military listening post on the Emba Soira to monitor the movement of the Arab coalition involved in the war in Yemen and to eavesdrop on Iran. The installation would also be aimed at observing the Bab-el-Mandeb Strait and the movement of commercial shipping in the southern Red Sea. In an official press release, the Eritrean Ministry of Information has vehemently denied the existence of this installation, calling it "ludicrous disinformation", "deliberately planted by certain countries and agencies to serve ulterior agendas".

The first indication that the listening post was established came in a report from the American geopolitical intelligence platform, Stratfor which said in December 2012 that both Israel and Iran had bases in Eritrea. The report said: "According to Stratfor diplomatic and media sources, Israel has small naval teams in the Dahlak archipelago and Massawa and a listening post in Amba Soira. Israel's presence in Eritrea is very focused and precise, involving intelligence gathering in the Red Sea and monitoring Iran's activities. Various Stratfor diplomatic sources have said that Israel's presence in Eritrea is small but significant."

== Climate ==
Climate data for Emba Soira
Month	Jan	Feb	Mar	Apr	May	Jun	Jul	Aug	Sep	Oct	Nov	Dec	Year
Mean daily maximum °C (°F)	4.0 (39.2)	4.4 (39.9)	6.8 (44.2)	8.9 (48.0)	11.8 (53.2)	14.7 (58.4)	15.2 (59.4)	14.7 (58.5)	12.9 (55.3)	10.6 (51.1)	8.1 (46.6)	5.5 (41.9)	9.8 (49.6)
Mean daily minimum °C (°F)	−3.4 (25.8)	−3.1 (26.4)	−2.1 (28.2)	−0.4 (31.2)	1.3 (34.3)	3.5 (38.3)	5.5 (41.9)	5.3 (41.5)	3.3 (37.9)	1.1 (33.9)	−1.2 (29.8)	−2.5 (27.5)	0.6 (33.1)
Source: Climate Data
