= Ghinda subregion =

Coordinates: 15.444540°N 39.095864°E

Ghinda
- Subregion
- Interactive map of Ghinda
- Country: Eritrea
- Region: Northern Red Sea
- Capital: Ghinda
- Time zone: UTC+3 (GMT +3)

Ghinda subregion is a subregion in the Northern Red Sea region (Zoba Semienawi Keyih Bahri) of Eritrea. Its capital lies at Ghinda.
