= CWB =

CWB may stand for:

== Businesses and organisations ==
- Canadian Western Bank
- Canadian Wheat Board
- Canadian Welding Bureau
- Center for Wooden Boats, a non-profit organization
- Central Weather Bureau of Taiwan

== Music ==
- Chocolate Watchband, a psychedelic 60s band
- Conductors Without Borders, an international musical-training effort

== Places ==
=== Hong Kong ===
- Causeway Bay
- Central–Wan Chai Bypass
- Clear Water Bay

=== Elsewhere ===
- Afonso Pena International Airport, Brazil (by IATA code)
- Colwyn Bay railway station, north Wales (by GBR code)

== Science ==
- Certified Wildlife Biologist, a professional certification offered by The Wildlife Society
- Counterproductive work behavior
- Cwb is one of four symbols for the Oceanic climate under the Köppen climate classification system, although generally limited to highland areas in the tropics
