= Mendefera =

Mendefera መንደፈራ منديفيرا
- Town
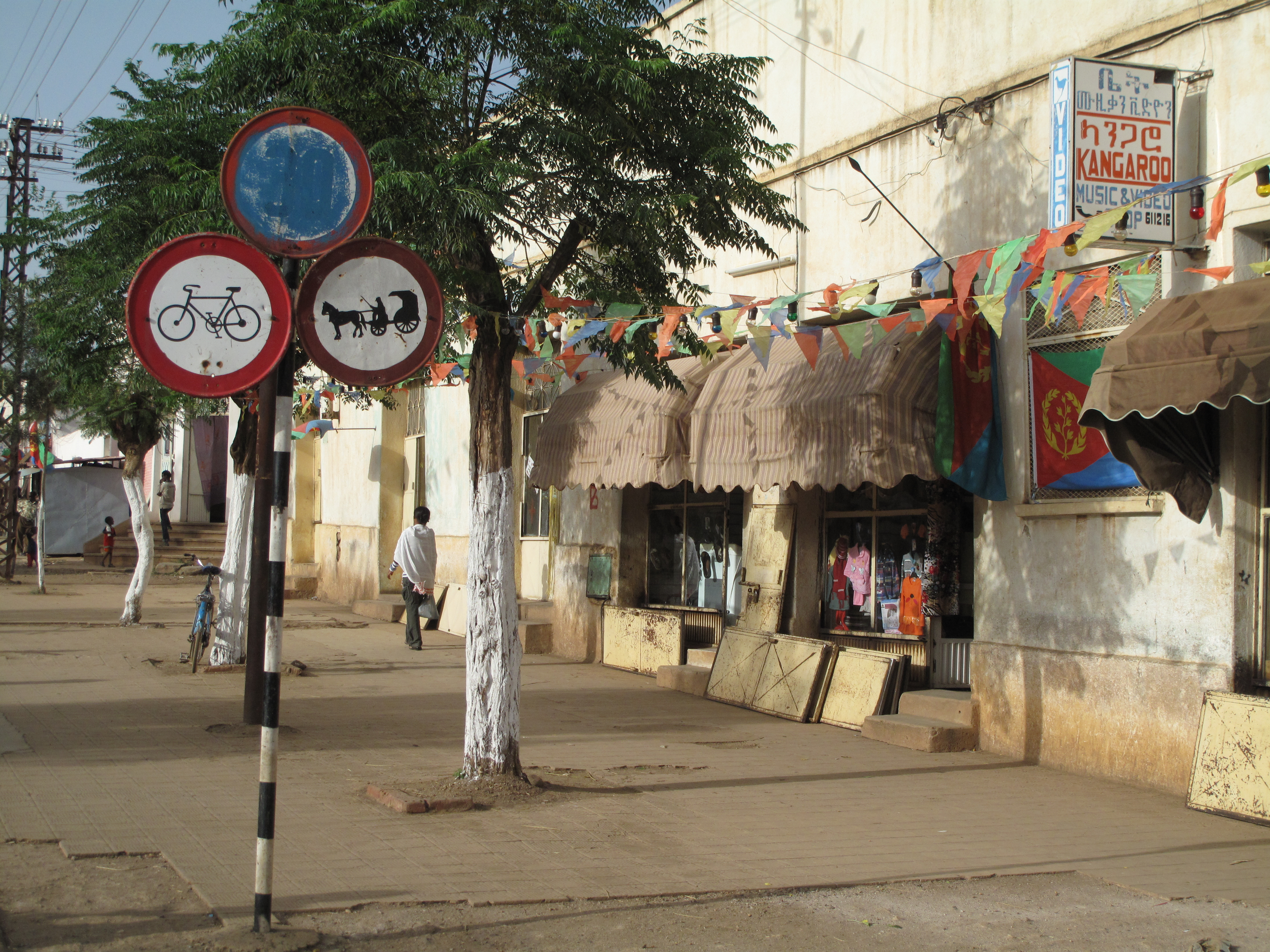
- Road signs in Mendefera

- Location in Eritrea
- Coordinates: 14°53′14″N 38°48′55″E
- Country: Eritrea
- Region: Debub
- District: Mendefera

Government
  - Governor: Eskyas Wubet
- Elevation: 1,972 m (6,470 ft)

Population (2012)
  - Town: 63,492
  - Metro: 64,000
- Climate: BSh Cwb

Mendefera (Tigrinya: መንደፈራ), formerly Adi Ugri, is an ancient town which is now the capital city of the Southern Region or Zoba Debub of Eritrea. The town's name derives from the high hill in the center of the city and it means that "who dared it" (in English) or "መን ደፈራ"( in Tigrinya) as it was a jungle and is a source of pride to Eritreans. The city is a reminder of the local anti-colonial movement.

== History ==
The area around Mendefera evolved into an important region in the Aksumite civilisation. Though satisfactory excavations have not yet been made, a graveyard dating back to the 2nd century BCE has been found. It contained skeletons, pottery, necklace and bronze bracelets. Numerous buildings have been excavated since 1959, with both crosses and local and Roman coins found. Many areas, including tombs, have yet to be explored.

The modern town of Mendefera was built during the Italian era. The town is now bustling market town in a fertile region of Eritrea. It is a place where small and large scale factories produce different products.

Mendefera is famous for its anticolonial movement during the Italian colonial administration and is a great fighter contributor of the Eritrean Liberation Front (ELF) as it is home to one of the oldest schools in Eritrea, San Giorgio School.

== Climate ==
Mendefera has a borderline climate that borders both on a cool semi-arid climate (BSk) and a subtropical highland climate (Cwb). Except during the humid wet season of July and August when heavy cloud cover depresses temperatures by around 5 °C or 9.0 °F, daytime temperatures are very warm to hot; however, the thin, dry air means that mornings are pleasantly cool throughout the year.

Climate data for Mendefera
Month	Jan	Feb	Mar	Apr	May	Jun	Jul	Aug	Sep	Oct	Nov	Dec	Year
Mean daily maximum °C (°F)	27.8 (82.0)	28.5 (83.3)	30.0 (86.0)	30.0 (86.0)	29.5 (85.1)	28.2 (82.8)	23.3 (73.9)	22.6 (72.7)	27.5 (81.5)	27.5 (81.5)	26.6 (79.9)	26.6 (79.9)	27.3 (81.2)
Mean daily minimum °C (°F)	8.0 (46.4)	9.2 (48.6)	11.1 (52.0)	12.0 (53.6)	12.7 (54.9)	12.6 (54.7)	11.7 (53.1)	12.3 (54.1)	12.2 (54.0)	9.7 (49.5)	8.6 (47.5)	8.1 (46.6)	10.7 (51.3)
Average rainfall mm (inches)	0 (0)	4 (0.2)	12 (0.5)	28 (1.1)	41 (1.6)	57 (2.2)	190 (7.5)	189 (7.4)	50 (2.0)	11 (0.4)	16 (0.6)	4 (0.2)	602 (23.7)
Source: Climate-Data

== See also ==
- Mendefera District
