= Southern region (Eritrea) =

Administration region in western Eritrea

Southern region ዞባ ደቡብ (Tigrinya) إقليم الجنوبي (Arabic)
- Region
- Southern region in Eritrea
- Coordinates: 14°48′N 39°00′E
- Country: Eritrea
- Capital: Mendefera

Government
  - Administrator: Efrem Gebrekristos

Area
  - Total: 8,000 km^{2} (3,100 sq mi)

Population
  - Total: 1,476,765
  - Density: 180/km^{2} (480/sq mi)
- Demonym(s): Debubdian, Tigrinyas
- ISO 3166 code: ER-DU
- HDI (2022): 0.469 low · 3rd

The Southern region (Tigrinya: ዞባ ደቡብ, romanized: zoba debub, Arabic: إقليم الجنوبي), is an administrative region of Eritrea. The region was formed on 15 April 1996, from the historical provinces of Seraye and Akele Guzai. It lies along a portion of the national border with Ethiopia. As of 2005, the region had a population of 952,100 compared to a population of 839,700 in 2001. The net growth rate was 11.81 per cent. The total area of the province was 8000.00 km^{2} and the density was 119.01 persons per km^{2}. The highest point in Eritrea, is Mount Soira 3,018 m (9,902 ft), is located in the region, situated east of Senafe. It shares borders with Central region in the north, Northern Red Sea in the east, Gash Barka in the west and Ethiopia in the south. It is the largest region in the country by population.

== Geography ==
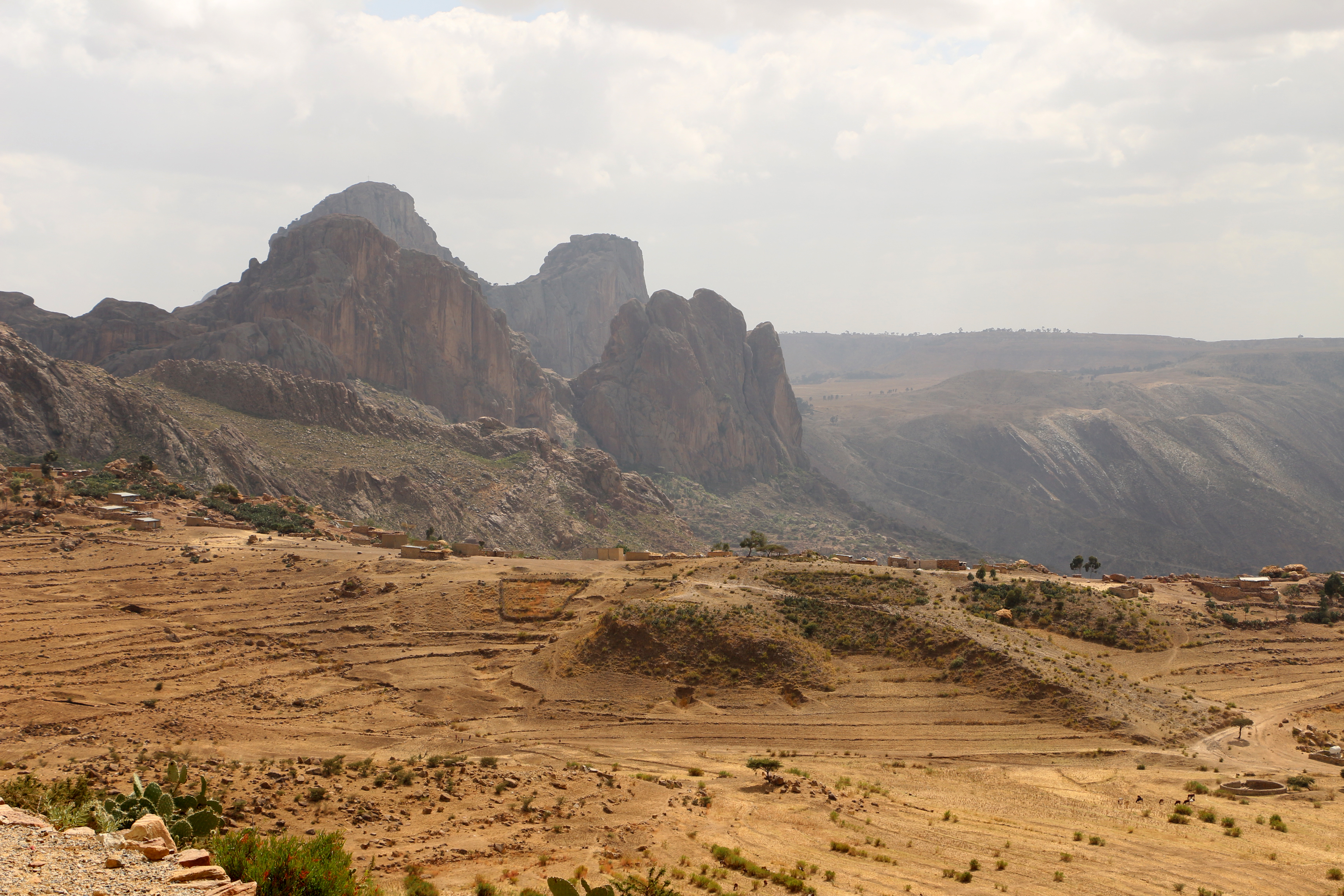
Mountains around Senafe

The Southern region is one of the six zobas (administrative regions) of Eritrea, located in the southern part of the country with longitude of 38° 15' – 39° 40' east and latitude 14° 25' – 15° 15 north. It shares borders with the Central region in the north, Northern Red Sea region in the east, Gash Barka in the west and Ethiopia in the south. It is the largest region in the country by population. This region has an area of around 8,000 square kilometers, and its capital is Mendefera (Adi Ugri). Other towns in the region include Adi Keyh, Mayduma, Adi Quala, Dekemhare, Debarwa, Segeneyti, Areza and Senafe. The archaeological sites of Metera, Qohaito and Mendefera are also located here. The highest point in this region, and in Eritrea, is Mount Soira 3,018 m (9,902 ft), situated east of Senafe. The topography of the region has coastal plains, which are hotter than the regions around the highland plateau. There are two rainy seasons, the heavier one during summer and the lighter one during spring. The climate and geography of the region along with other regions of Eritrea is similar to the one of Ethiopia. The hottest month is May recording temperatures up to 30 °C (86 °F), while the coldest months are December to February when it reaches freezing temperature. The region received around 508 mm (20.0 in) of rainfall and the soil is conducive for agriculture.

== Demographics ==
As of 2005, the region had a population of 952,100 compared to a population of 839,700 in 2001. The net growth rate was 11.81 per cent. The total area of the province was 8000.00 km^{2} and the density was 119.01 persons per km^{2}. As of 2002, the Total Fertility Rate (TFR), defined as the children per woman was 5.7. The General Fertility Rate (GFR), defined as the births per 1,000 women between the ages of 15 and 45 remained at 172.0. The Crude Birth Rate (CBR), the number of births per 1,000 population, was 34.0. The percentage of women pregnant as of 2002 out of the total population was 9.5 per cent. The mean number of children ever born stood at 6.6. The Infant Mortality Rate (IMR), defined as the number of deaths of children for every 1,000 born was 58.0 while the Child Mortality Rate (CMR), defined as the number of child deaths for every 1,000 children 5 years of age was 56.0. The under-5 mortality rate stood at 111.0. The number of children with the prevalence of Acute Respiratory Infection (ARI) was 1811, fever was 1811, and Diarrhea was 1811. The number of women with the knowledge of AIDS was 2,388 and the number of people with no knowledge of the disease or its prevention was 0.0 per cent.

== Education and economy ==
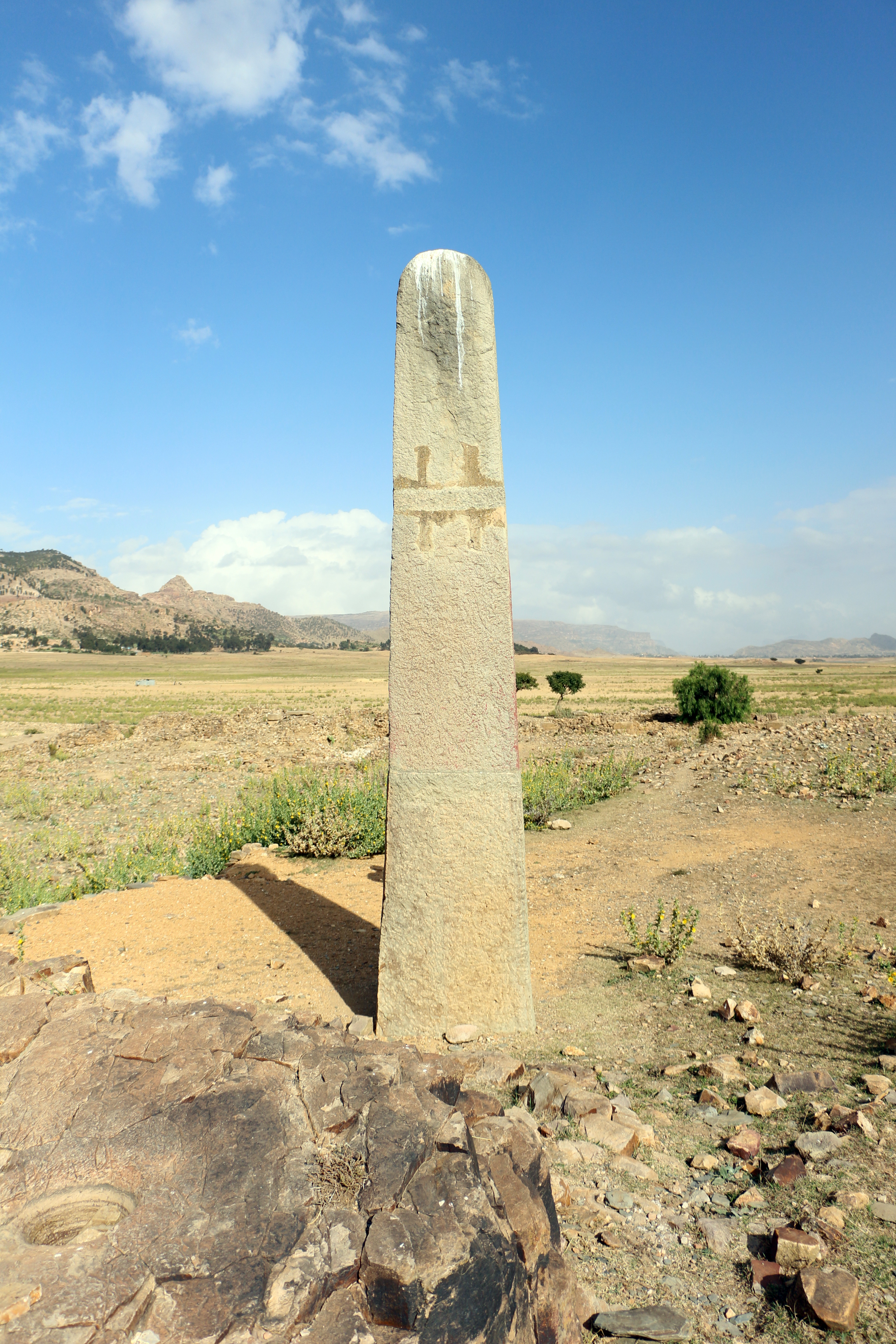
A historical monument

As of 2002, the number of males completing or attending highest level of schooling in the region was 4,105 while it was 5,417 females. The per centage of literate males was 62.80 and the percentage of literate females was 41.90. A fraction of 34.40 males had no education, while the corresponding number for females was 52.70. The fraction of males completing secondary school stood at 1.60 and the fraction of males completing more than secondary was 001. The corresponding numbers for females was 1.10 and 001 respectively.

As of 2002, the number of people engaged in Professional/technical/managerial activities was 7.00 per cent, Clerical was 1.20 per cent, Sales and services was 19.70 per cent, Skilled Manual was 10.10 per cent, Unskilled Manual was 0.00 per cent, Domestic Service was 8.80 per cent and Agriculture was 52.10 per cent. The total number of employed men was 3,042 and the total number of employed women was 3,255. The number of men who were paid their total earnings in cash was 74.50 per cent, in kind was 6.60 and in both was 5.20. The number of women who were paid their total earnings in cash was 77.60 per cent, in kind was 6.10 per cent and in both was 4.50 per cent.

== Subregions ==
The region also includes the following twelve subregions: Adi Keyh, Adi Quala, Areza, Maidima, Debarwa, Dekemhare, Mai-Mne, Mendefera, Segeneiti, Senafe, Tera-Emni, Tsorona. Eritrea has a one party national Assembly governed by People's Front for Democracy and Justice (PFDJ) (originally Eritrean Liberation Front), From the time of independence since 30 May 1991, the country has been continuing with a transitional government elected during the elections in April 1993. The scheduled elections in 2001 has been postponed indefinitely. The regional and local elections are conducted on a periodic basis on a restricted framework. All men and women of any ethnic or religious background are eligible to vote. No parties or groups other than PFDJ are allowed to contest and the elections are presided by representatives from PDFJ. Policy decisions should be centered around the party mandate and opposition and dissenters have been imprisoned.
