= Northern Red Sea region =

Administrative region in northeastern Eritrea

Coordinates: 16°00′N 39°00′E

Northern Red Sea region ዞባ ሰሜናዊ ቀይሕ ባሕሪ (Tigrinya) إقليم شمال البحر الأحمر (Arabic)
- Region
- Northern Red Sea region in Eritrea
- Country: Eritrea
- Capital: Massawa

Government
  - Administrator: Osman Omar Mohammed

Area
  - Total: 27,800 km^{2} (10,700 sq mi)

Population
  - Total: 897,454
  - Density: 32.3/km^{2} (83.6/sq mi)
- ISO 3166 code: ER-SK
- HDI (2022): 0.400 low · 5th

The Northern Red Sea region (Tigrinya: ዞባ ሰሜናዊ ቀይሕ ባሕሪ, romanized: Zoba Semienawi Keyih Bahri, Arabic: إقليم شمال البحر الأحمر), is an administrative region of Eritrea. It lies along the northern three quarters of the Red Sea, and includes the Dahlak Archipelago and the coastal city of Massawa.

As of 2005, the region had a population of 653,300 compared to a population of 576,200 in 2001. The net growth rate was 11.80 per cent. The total area of the province was 27800.00 km^{2} and the density was 23.50 persons per km^{2}.

== Geography ==
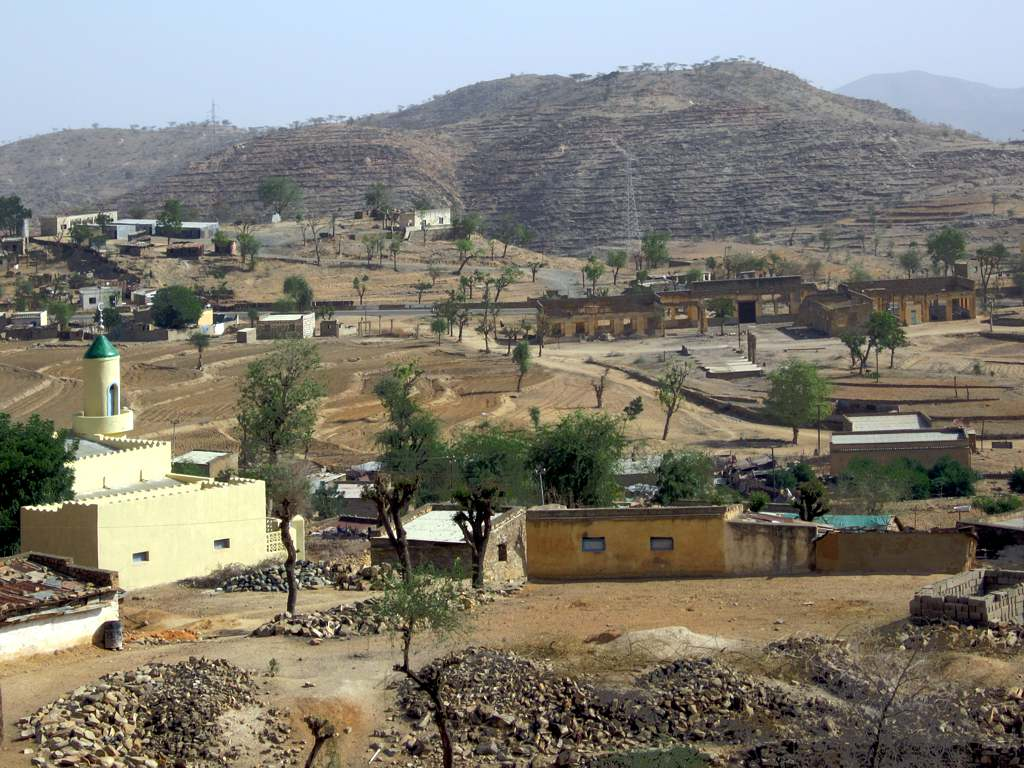
Embatchalla, a small town in the region

The Northern Red Sea Region borders the Anseba, Maekel (Central) and Debub (Southern) regions to the west, and the Southern Red Sea Region to the east. It has an area of around 27,800 km^{2}. The lowest point in Eritrea, Lake Kulul, is in this region. The topography of the region has coastal plains, which are hotter than the regions around the highland plateau. There are two rainy seasons, the heavier one during summer and the lighter one during spring. The climate and geography of the region along with other regions of Eritrea is similar to the one of Ethiopia. The hottest month is May recording temperatures up to 30 °C (86 °F), while the coldest month is December to February when it reaches freezing temperature. The region received around 508 mm (20.0 in) of rainfall and the soil is salty and not conducive for agriculture.

== Demographics ==
As of 2005, the region had a population of 653,300 compared to a population of 576,200 in 2001. The net growth rate was 11.80 per cent. The total area of the province was 27800.00 km^{2} and the density was 23.50 persons per km^{2}. As of 2002, the Total Fertility Rate (TFR), defined as the children per woman was 4.5. The General Fertility Rate (GFR), defined as the births per 1,000 women between the ages of 15 and 45 remained at 156.0. The Crude Birth Rate (CBR), the number of births per 1,000 population, was 33.0. The percentage of women pregnant as of 2002 out of the total population was 8.9 per cent. The mean number of children ever born stood at 5.8. The Infant Mortality Rate (IMR), defined as the number of deaths of children for every 1,000 born was 77.0 while the Child Mortality Rate (CMR), defined as the number of child deaths for every 1,000 children 5 years of age was 83.0. The under-5 mortality rate stood at 154.0. The number of children with the prevalence of Acute Respiratory Infection (ARI) was 778, fever was 778, and Diarrhea was 778. The number of women with the knowledge of AIDS was 1,148 and the number of people with no knowledge of the disease or its prevention was 0.0 per cent.

== Education and economy ==
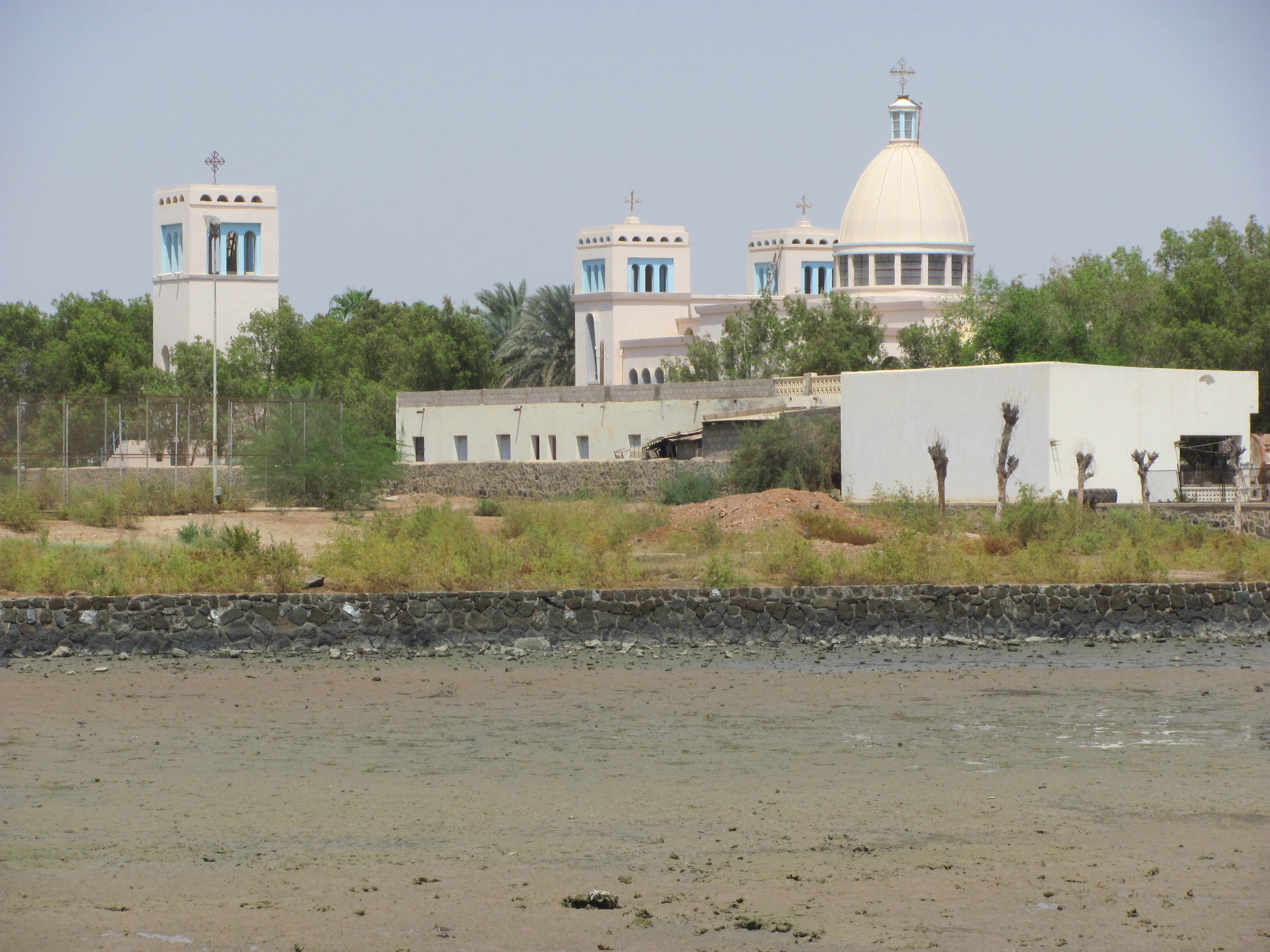
Coptic Cathedral at Massawa

As of 2002, the number of males completing or attending highest level of schooling in the region was 1,893 while it was 2,216 females. The percentage of literate males was 48.10 and the percentage of literate females was 28.00. A fraction of 52.70 males had no education, while the corresponding number for females was 69.20. The fraction of males completing secondary school stood at 1.40 and the fraction of males completing more than secondary was 001. The corresponding numbers for females was 1.10 and 000 respectively.

As of 2002, the number of people engaged in Professional/technical/managerial activities was 7.80 per cent, Clerical was 4.80 per cent, Sales and services was 20.70 per cent, Skilled Manual was 12.90 per cent, Unskilled Manual was 2.00 per cent, Domestic Service was 33.40 per cent and Agriculture was 18.40 per cent. The total number of employed men was 1,327 and the total number of employed women was 1,458. The number of men who were paid their total earnings in cash was 67.70 per cent, in kind was 6.10 and in both was 15.90. The number of women who were paid their total earnings in cash was 84.40 per cent, in kind was 4.50 per cent and in both was 1.30 per cent.

== Districts ==
The region also includes the following districts: Afabet District, Dahlak District, Ghelalo District, Foro District, Ghinda District, Karura District, Massawa District, Nakfa District and She'eb District. Eritrea has a one party national Assembly governed by People's Front for Democracy and Justice (PFDJ) (originally Eritrean Liberation Front), an authoritarian government. From the time of independence since 30 May 1991, the country has been continuing with a transitional government elected during the elections in April 1993. The scheduled elections in 2001 has been postponed indefinitely. The regional and local elections are conducted on a periodic basis on a restricted framework. All men and women of any ethnic or religious background are eligible to vote. No parties or groups other than PFDJ are allowed to contest and the elections are presided by representatives from PDFJ. Policy decisions should be centered around the party mandate and opposition and dissenters have been imprisoned.
