= Subregions of Eritrea =

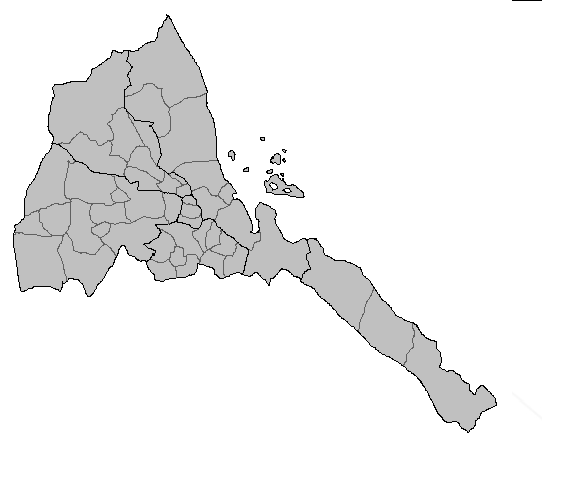
The subregions of Eritrea

The six regions of Eritrea are divided into administrative subregions (Tigrinya: ንኡስ ዞባ).

== Anseba region ==
- Adi Tekelezan
- Asmat
- Hamelmalo
- Elabered
- Geleb
- Hagaz
- Halhal
- Habero
- Keren
- Kerkebet
- Sela

== Central (Maekel) region ==
- Berikh
- Ghala Nefhi
- North Eastern
- North Western
- Serejaka
- South Eastern
- South Western

== Gash-Barka region ==
- Akurdet
- Barentu
- Dghe
- Forto
- Gogne
- Omhajer
- Haykota
- Logo Anseba
- Mensura
- Mogolo
- Molki
- Shambuko
- Teseney
- Upper Gash

== Northern Red Sea region ==
- Afabet
- Adobha
- Dahlak
- Ghela'elo
- Foro
- Ghinda
- Karura
- Massawa
- Nakfa
- She'eb

== Southern (Debub) region ==
- Mai ani
- Tsorona
- Kudo Be'ur
- Adi Keyh
- Adi Quala
- Areza
- Debarwa
- Dekemhare
- Mai-Mne
- Mendefera
- Segeneiti
- Senafe

== Southern Red Sea region ==
- Are'eta
- Assab
- Central Denkalya
- Southern Denkalya
