= Regions of Eritrea =

The regions of Eritrea are the primary geographical divisions through which Eritrea is administered. Six in total, they include the Central, Anseba, Gash-Barka, Southern, Northern Red Sea and Southern Red Sea regions.

At the time of independence in 1993 Eritrea was arranged into ten provinces. These provinces were similar to the nine provinces operating during the colonial period. In 1996, these were consolidated into six regions (zobas). Gash-Barka Region is the largest and sparsely populated region and is called the "bread-basket".

The People's Front for Democracy and Justice or PFDJ (originally Eritrean People's Liberation Front) rules the country and its regions as a single-party totalitarian government. The regional and local elections are conducted on a periodic basis on a restricted framework. All men and women of any ethnic or religious background are eligible to vote. No parties or groups other than PFDJ are allowed to contest and the elections are presided by representatives from PFDJ.

== History ==
At the time of independence in 1993 Eritrea was arranged into ten provinces and they were Asmara (the capital of Eritrea), Akele Guzay, Barka, Denkalia, Gash-Setit, Hamasien, Sahel, Semhar, Senhit and Seraye. These provinces were similar to the nine provinces operating during the colonial period. In 1996, these were consolidated into six regions (zobas). The boundaries of these new regions are based on catchment basins. Critics of this policy contend that the Government of Eritrea was erasing the historical fabric of Eritrea while proponents believe that these new Regional boundaries would ease historical land disputes. Furthermore, proponents of this policy argue that basing boundaries on an important natural resource would ease the planning of its use.

== Administration ==
Regions of Eritrea

Each region has a locally elected regional assembly while the local administrator is appointed by the President of Eritrea. During Cabinet meetings the President also meets with the Regional Administrators who report on the activities of their regions. The Regional Assemblies are charged with developing a budget for local programs and hearing the concerns of the local populations. Local programs included cultural events, infrastructure such as feeder roads, and to promote afforestation. Eritrea has a single-party National Assembly governed by the People's Front for Democracy and Justice or PFDJ (originally Eritrean Liberation Front), a totalitarian government. From the time of independence since 30 May 1991, the country has been continuing with a transitional government elected during the elections in April 1993. The scheduled elections in 2001 has been postponed indefinitely. The regional and local elections are conducted on a periodic basis on a restricted framework. All men and women of any ethnic or religious background are eligible to vote. No parties or groups other than PFDJ are allowed to contest and the elections are presided by representatives from PFDJ. Policy decisions should be centered around the party mandate and opposition and dissenters have been imprisoned.

== Geography ==
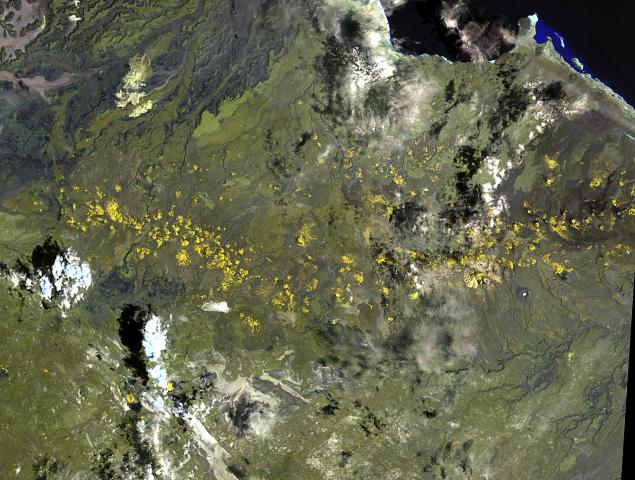
A volcanic field

The topography of the regions on the Western side, namely, Anseba, Central and has highland plateau, which are cooler than the regions around the coastal plains. There are two rainy seasons, the heavier one during summer and the lighter one during spring. The climate and geography of the region along with other regions of Eritrea is similar to the one of Ethiopia. The average elevation in the region is around 1,800 m (5,900 ft) to 2,100 m (6,900 ft). The hottest month is May recording temperatures up to 30 °C (86 °F), while the coldest month is December to February when it reaches freezing temperature. The region received around 508 mm (20.0 in) of rainfall and the soil is conducive for agriculture.

There are a number of flora and fauna species in the high plateau regions in the West. Notably this was historic habitat for the endangered painted hunting dog (Lycaon pictus), a canid which is now thought to be extirpated from the region. Eritrea as a whole was extensively forested as recently as 1900. However, at present the total forest cover of Eritrea is less than one percent. Wildlife such as hamadryas baboons, Soemmerring's gazelle, dorcas gazelle, warthog, black-backed jackal, Ruppells sandfox, dikdik, African golden wolf, hyena, Abyssinian hare, wild ass and ostriches are found in this region. African wild dog was also found in the coastal region, but their present condition is unknown. There have been reports of cheetah occurring in this region, but there has been no evidence of their presence. It is extremely likely that both cheetah and wild dog are extinct in Eritrea.

== Regions ==
Regions
Region	Map number	Population	Area (km^{2})	Capital	Governor	ISO code	Former province
Maekel region, Central ዞባ ማእከል إقليم المركزية	1	1,053,254	1,300	Asmara	Ramadan Osman Awliyai	ER-MA	Hamasien
Anseba Region, Anseba ዞባ ዓንሰባ إقليم عنسبا	2	893,587	23,200	Keren	Ali Mahmoud	ER-AN	Senhit, Hamasien
Gash-Barka Region, Gash-Barka ዞባ ጋሽ ባርካ منطقة القاش وبركا	3	1,103,742	33,200	Barentu	Musa Raba	ER-GB	Barka, Gash-Setit, Seraye, Hamasien
Debub Region, Southern ዞባ ደቡብ المنطقة الجنوبية	4	1,476,765	8,000	Mendefera	Efrem Gebrekristos	ER-DU	Seraye, Akele Guzay, Hamasien
Northern Red Sea Region, Semienawi Keyih Bahri ዞባ ሰሜናዊ ቀይሕ ባሕሪ منطقة البحر الأحمر الشمال	5	897,454	27,800	Massawa	Osman Omar Mohammed	ER-SK	Semhar, Sahel, Akele Guzay, Hamasien
Southern Red Sea Region, Debubawi Keyih Bahri ዞባ ደቡባዊ ቀይሕ ባሕሪ منطقة البحر الأحمر الجنوب	6	398,073	27,600	Asseb	Tsegereda Woldegergish	ER-DK	Denkalia

== Subregions ==
The regions, with their subregions:

No.	Region (ዞባ, إقليم)	Sub-region (ንኡስ ዞባ, دون الإقليمية)
1	Maekel (ዞባ ማእከል, إقليم المركزية)	Asmara, Berikh, Ghala-Nefhi, Semienawi Mibraq, Serejaka, Debubawi Mibraq, Semienawi Mi'erab, Debubawi Mi'erab
2	Anseba (ዞባ ዓንሰባ, إقليم عنسبا)	Adi Tekelezan, Asmat, Elabered, Geleb, Hagaz, Halhal, Habero, Keren, Kerkebet, Sel'a
3	Gash-Barka (ዞባ ጋሽ ባርካ, منطقة القاش وبركا)	Agordat, Barentu, Dghe, Forto, Gogne, Haykota, Logo-Anseba, Mensura, Mogolo, Molki, Guluj, Shambuko, Tesseney, La'elay Gash
4	Debub (ዞባ ደቡብ, المنطقة الجنوبية)	Adi Keyh, Adi Quala, Areza, Debarwa, Dekemhare, Mai Ayni, Mai Mne, Mendefera, Segheneyti, Senafe, Tserona, Emni Haili
5	Northern Red Sea (ዞባ ሰሜናዊ ቀይሕ ባሕሪ, منطقة البحر الأحمر الشمال)	Afabet, Dahlak, Ghel'alo, Foro, Ghinda, Karura, Massawa, Nakfa, She'eb
6	Southern Red Sea (ዞባ ደቡባዊ ቀይሕ ባሕሪ, منطقة البحر الأحمر الجنوب)	Are'eta, Central Dankalia, Tio, Aytos, Saroyta, Eddi, Baylul Southern Dankalia, Assab

== See also ==
- List of Eritrean regions by Human Development Index
- ISO 3166-2:ER
