= Religion in Eritrea =

The two main religions in Eritrea are Christianity and Islam. However, the number of adherents of each faith is subject to debate. Estimates of the Christian share of the population range from 47% to 53%, while estimates of the Muslim share of the population range from 37% to 52%.

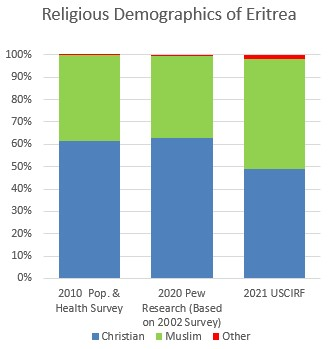
Estimates of the religious makeup of the Eritrean population

Religion in Eritrea (Pew Research Center 2020)
1. Islam (51.7%)
2. Christianity (46.7%)
3. Other (1.60%)

Most Eritrean Christians belong to the Eritrean Orthodox Tewahedo Church, although a minority is affiliated with the Eritrean Catholic Church and various Protestant denominations. Eritrean Muslims are predominantly Sunni.

Apart from the officially recognized denominations of Christianity and Sunni Islam, all other faiths and denominations are in principle required to undergo a registration process; in practice they are not allowed to register. Among other things, the government's registration system requires religious groups to submit personal information on their membership to be allowed to worship.

== Faiths and denominations ==
There are two major religions in Eritrea: Christianity (four denominations) and Islam (only the Sunni school). However, the number of adherents is subject to debate.

- In the 2010 Eritrea Population and Health Survey, conducted by the Eritrean National Statistics Office and the Fafo Institute for Applied International Studies, 61.4% of all survey respondents reported being Christian (56.3% Orthodox, 4.2% Catholic, and 0.8% Protestant), with 38.4% reporting being Muslim, and the remaining 0.2% adhering to traditional faiths. Among women, who made up 87.6% of those surveyed, 60.7% reported being Christian and 39.0% Muslim. In a similar survey of Eritrean women conducted in 2002, 63.0% reported being Christian (57.8% Orthodox, 4.6% Catholic, and 0.7% Protestant), with 36.6% reporting being Muslim.
- In 2015, Pew Research estimated that, by 2020, 62.9% of the population would be Christian, while 36.6% would be Muslim, with the rest following other religions. Pew based its estimate of Eritrea's religious composition on the 2002 survey referenced above.
- The United States Commission on International Religious Freedom's 2021 annual report states that the country's population is "split in half between Christians (49 percent) and Muslims (49 percent)".
- In a 2016 report by Aid to the Church in Need, that organization estimated around 50 percent of Eritrea's population adhered to Islam, and 48 percent followed Christianity, with all remaining religions accounting for two percent.
- According to ACS-Italia estimate, around 52% of Eritrea's population in 2017 adhered to Islam, and 46% followed Christianity, with the remaining 2% of residents practicing other religions, including traditional faiths and animism.
- The 2011 edition of the Encyclopedia of Global Religion matches the Pew Research Center estimate of 63% Christian, breaking it down further to: 58% Orthodox; 5% Roman Catholic; and less than 1% Protestant. That report further analyzed the regional distribution within Eritrea:

Religious affiliation in Eritrea
Region	Christians	Muslims	Other
Maekel Region, ዞባ ማእከል	94%	5%	1%
Debub Region, ዞባ ደቡብ	89%	11%	<1
Gash-Barka Region, ዞባ ጋሽ ባርካ	36%	63%	1%
Anseba Region, ዞባ ዓንሰባ	39%	61%	<1
Northern Red Sea Region, Semienawi Keyih Bahri ዞባ ሰሜናዊ ቀይሕ ባሕሪ	12%	87%	<1
Southern Red Sea Region, Debubawi Keyih Bahri ዞባ ደቡባዊ ቀይሕ ባሕሪ	37%	62%	<1

=== History of religion in Eritrea ===
The Kingdom of Aksum, covering much of modern-day Eritrea and the Tigray Region in northern Ethiopia, arose somewhere around the first or second centuries. The Aksumites erected a number of large stelae, which served a religious purpose in pre-Christian times. Over 200 years after the kingdom's formation, it adopted Christianity under King Ezana. Eritrea was also one of the first Islamic settlements in Africa, as a group of Muslims facing persecution in Mecca migrated to the Kingdom of Aksum. Islam spread to Ethiopia and Eritrea around 615 AD with the arrival of Uthman ibn Affan, one of the Sahabah (companions) of the Islamic prophet Muhammad. Uthman had been driven out of Hejaz and found shelter at Axum in the Tigray Region of Ethiopia under the protection of the Axumite king, Aṣḥama ibn Abjar.

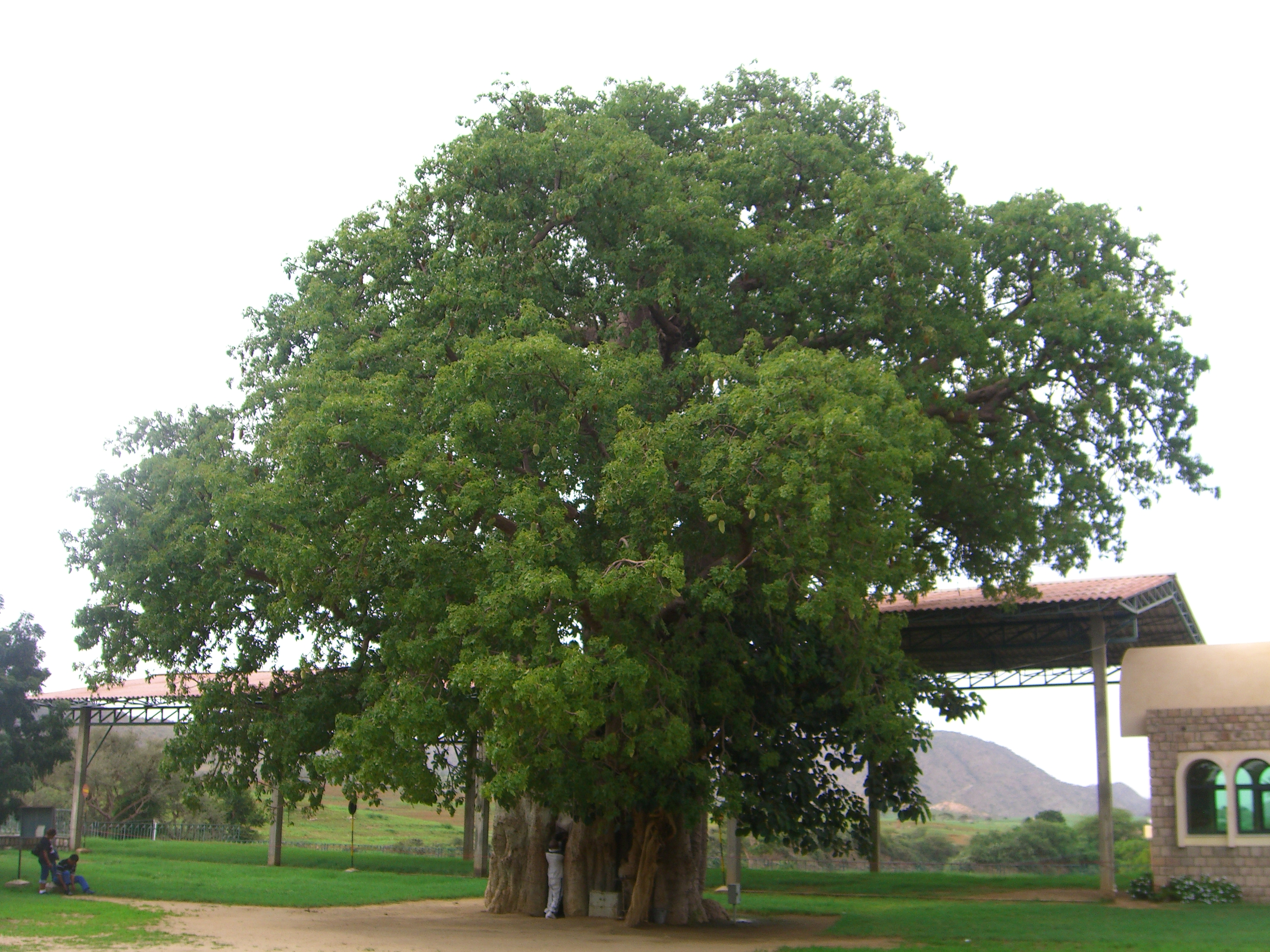
Madonna of the Baobab. In 1941, Italian soldiers took refuge in the tree from British planes. The tree was hit but the Italians and the shrine survived.

Another great power came in the person of the Imam of Harar in Ethiopia, Ahmad ibn Ibrahim al-Ghazi, also known as Ahmad Gurey or Gragn. Al-Ghazi led Muslim forces consisting of Somali, Harari, Oromo, Afar, Saho, Argobba, Hadiya, Silte and Gurage soldiers from present-day Ethiopia, Eritrea, Djibouti and Somalia. In 1530 he began to attack the plateau. Within four years he laid waste to the majority of the Christian highlands, including the Tigray Region of Ethiopia. Only by surrender and conversion could people save their lives. Only the intervention of the Portuguese transformed the flow of events. They landed at Massawa in 1541 and helped the Eritreans and Ethiopians to drive the Imams forces from the plateau. The Muslim forces dispersed, retreated and disappeared.

Catholicism was first brought to Eritrea by the Jesuits in 1600. In 1632, the order was expelled from Eritrea for wanting to convert the country (an Orthodox country) to Catholicism. In the 19th century, the Italians began to bring Eritrea under their sphere of influence and introduced Roman Catholicism again. Missionaries appeared in the 19th century and established the Lutheran and Evangelical churches. These organizations have been allowed to continue to practice. New groups, however, have been discouraged from establishing a base in Eritrea.

During Italian colonialism, Catholicism became quite widespread, mostly due to Italian settlement in Eritrea. At the beginning of the 1940s nearly 28% of the population of Italian Eritrea were Catholic, most of whom were Italians. However, the number of Italians in Eritrea decreased at the end of WWII under British military administration (which also had religious violence between Christians and Muslims), and especially after Eritrea came under Ethiopian authority in 1950, thus diminishing the Catholic Church's importance.

Under Ethiopian rule and the Eritrean War of Independence, the role of the Ethiopian Orthodox Church was strengthened, and it legitimized Ethiopian rule in Eritrea, which was controversial. Ethiopian propaganda framed the Eritrean struggle for liberation as a "Muslim separatist movement", which strengthened feelings among Eritrean Muslims that the Ethiopian Orthodox Church was a tool of the Ethiopian state.

During Derg rule, the Ethiopian state had a policy of state atheism, which was unpopular, especially in Eritrea. However, the Derg also co-opted many religions despite repressing them, such as with the Ethiopian Orthodox Church. They also for the first time recognized Islam in Ethiopia, co-opting it with the newly founded Ethiopian Islamic Affairs Supreme Council.

== Christianity ==
The various estimates shown above place Christianity (all denominations) as the religion of between 47% and 63% of the population of Eritrea. While elsewhere on the continent, Christianity in Africa was primarily introduced by European missionaries, this was not the case with the Tigray-Tigrinya people of Eritrea and Tigray Region in neighbouring Ethiopia (or with the Amhara people of Ethiopia). The ancient empire of the Kingdom of Aksum centered in north Tigray and the central highlands of Eritrea had intimate connections with the Mediterranean world in which Christianity grew. Christianity arrived in the Eritrean and Tigrayan area in the 4th century, growing dynamically in the pre-existing Jewish/Animistic mixed environment. The Tigrayan-Tigrinyas thus converted to Christianity centuries before most of Europe, thereby establishing one of the oldest state churches in the world. The Eritrean Orthodox have their origins in the 4th century Coptic mission of Syrian Frumentius in East Africa, when the first Archbishop was elected for the Aksumite Empire, under Ezana of Axum (r. 320–360). Among ecclesiastical buildings, most notable date from the 4th to the 14th centuries; for example Libanos, Bizen and Sina.

=== Eritrean Orthodox Tewahedo Church ===
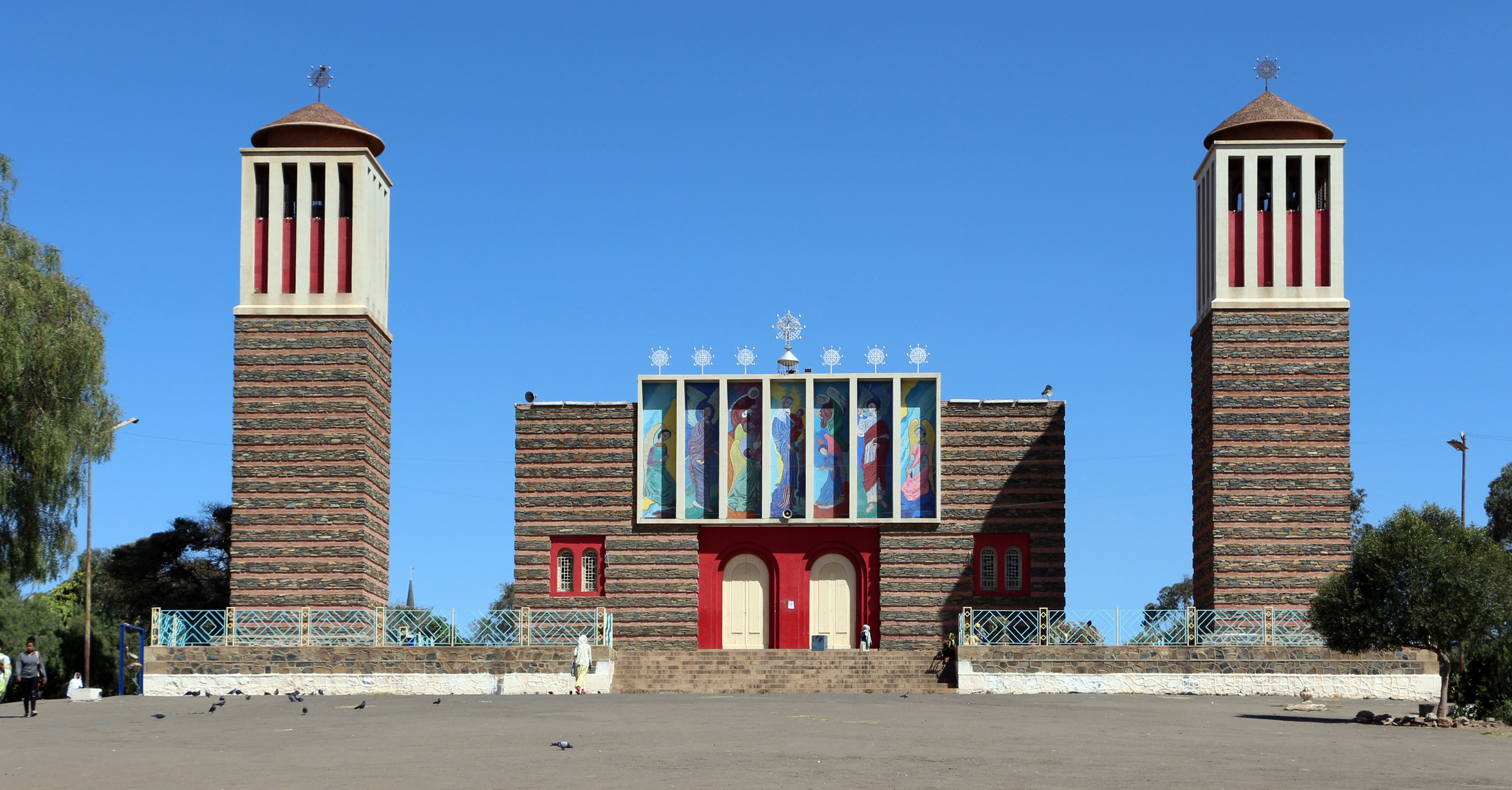
Enda Mariam Eritrean Orthodox Cathedral in the capital Asmara

A large majority of the Christian population of Eritrea belongs to the Eritrean Orthodox Tewahedo Church, The Eritrean Church was recognized by the Coptic Orthodox Church of Alexandria following independence in 1993, and in 1994 the two neighbouring churches affirmed their respective status. In April 1998 the former Archbishop Abune Phillipos of Asmara was elevated to the rank of Patriarch. He died in 2002 and was succeeded by Abune Yacob. The reign of Abune Yacob as Patriarch of Eritrea was very brief as he died not long after his enthronement, and he was succeeded by Abune Antonios as 3rd Patriarch of Eritrea. Abune Antonios was elected on 5 March 2004 and enthroned as the third Patriarch of the Orthodox Tewahedo Church of Eritrea on 24 April 2004. Pope Shenouda III presided at the ceremony in Asmara, together with the Holy Synod of the Eritrean Orthodox Church and a Coptic Orthodox Church delegation. Antonios was later formally deposed by the government. However, many believe that Abune Antonios was wrongly deposed and still consider him Patriarch. Many Eritrean Orthodox followers disagree with the Eritrean government making decisions in religious matters.

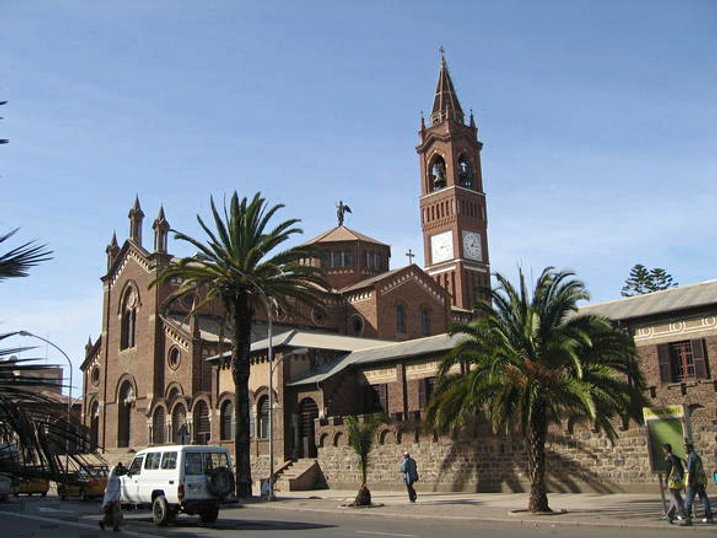
The Church of Our Lady of the Rosary, Asmara

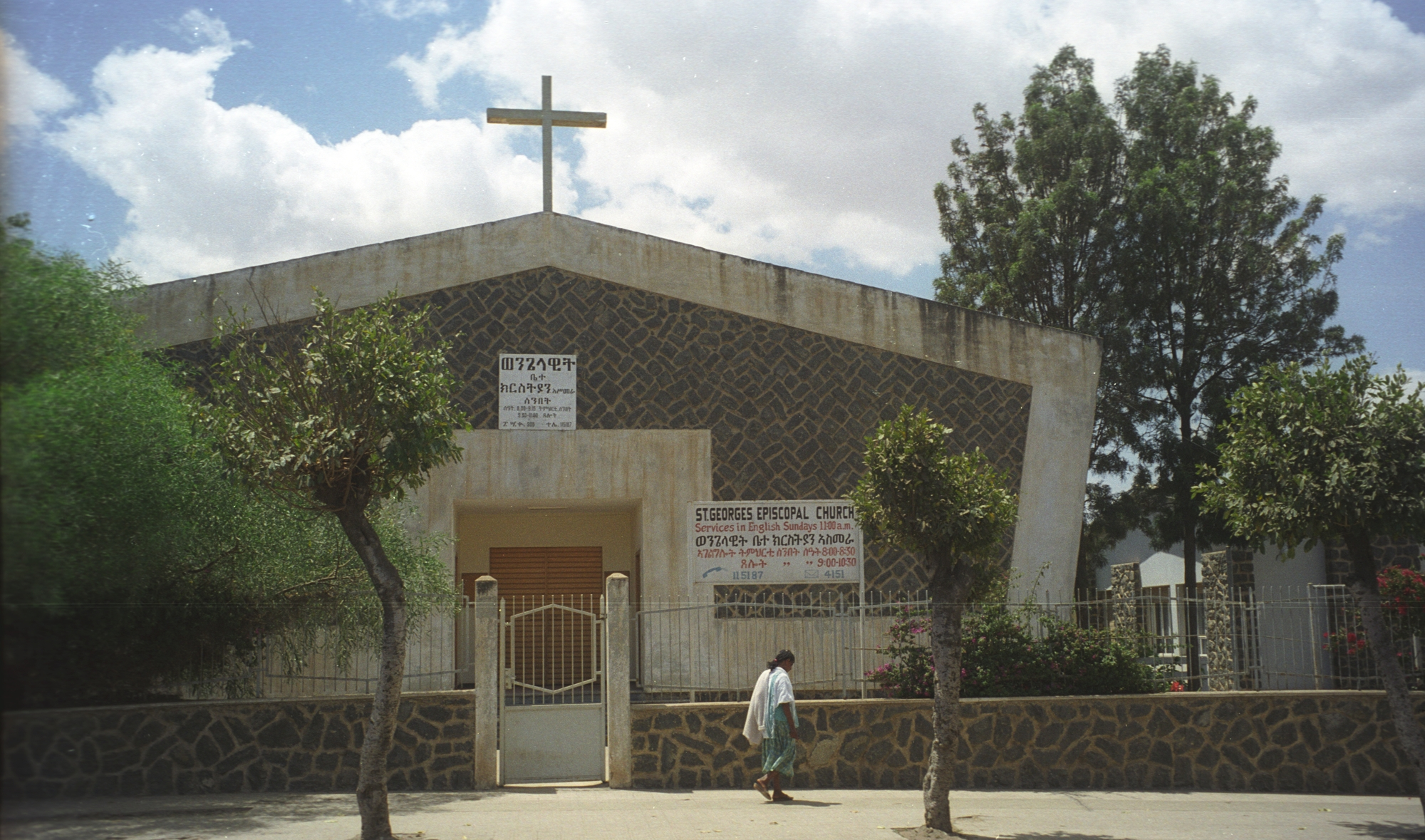
St. George's Episcopal Church, Asmara, Eritrea

=== Catholicism ===
Catholics make up 4–5% of the Eritrean population. The Eritrean Catholic Church and Roman Catholic Church has dioceses of Asmara, Keren and Barentu. Catholics in Eritrea mainly follow the Geʽez variant of the Alexandrian Rite, but the Roman Rite is also used. There are four territorial jurisdictions in the country known as eparchies. Before the era of Italian Eritrea, Roman Catholicism was already introduced into the country by Saint Justin de Jacobis and the Vincentian Fathers. Today the church is a distinctly Eritrean church, using the Geʽez language in the liturgy, although Masses continue to be celebrated also in Italian and Latin for the small Italian and Italo-Eritrean community, mainly in Asmara. When Eritrea was an Italian colony, all the colonists and the Italian military were of the Latin Church: in 1940 they constituted 11% of the total population. The Church of Our Lady of the Rosary was their main church. So, in the early 1940s, Catholicism was the religion of nearly 28% of people in the colony of Italian Eritrea.

=== Protestantism ===
Protestants, sometimes known by the slang name P'ent'ay, in Eritrea make up between less than 1% to 5% of the Christians. A minor church is the Kale Hiywot Church of Eritrea. Protestant denominations include Christian Brethren, Evangelical Church Mekane Yesus, Evangelical Lutheran Church of Eritrea. In 1926, Swedish missionaries founded the Evangelical/Lutheran Church of Eritrea. However, there was tension between the Catholic Church as the Roman Catholic Italians resisted and discouraged the spread of Protestantism in their colony and even lay prohibitions and numerous constraints on the activities of the Swedish missionaries. The Lutheran Church of Eritrea and its Swedish and Eritrean missionaries were the ones who translated the Bible from Geʽez, only understood by higher clergymen, into the Tigrinya language and other local languages and their main goal was to reach and "enlighten" as many people as possible in the world through education.

== Islam ==
The various estimates shown above place Islam as the religion of between 37% and 52% of the population of Eritrea. Whatever the total share of the overall population, a 2009 report finds that over 99% of Eritrean Muslims are Sunnis, with less than 1% Shias.

=== History ===
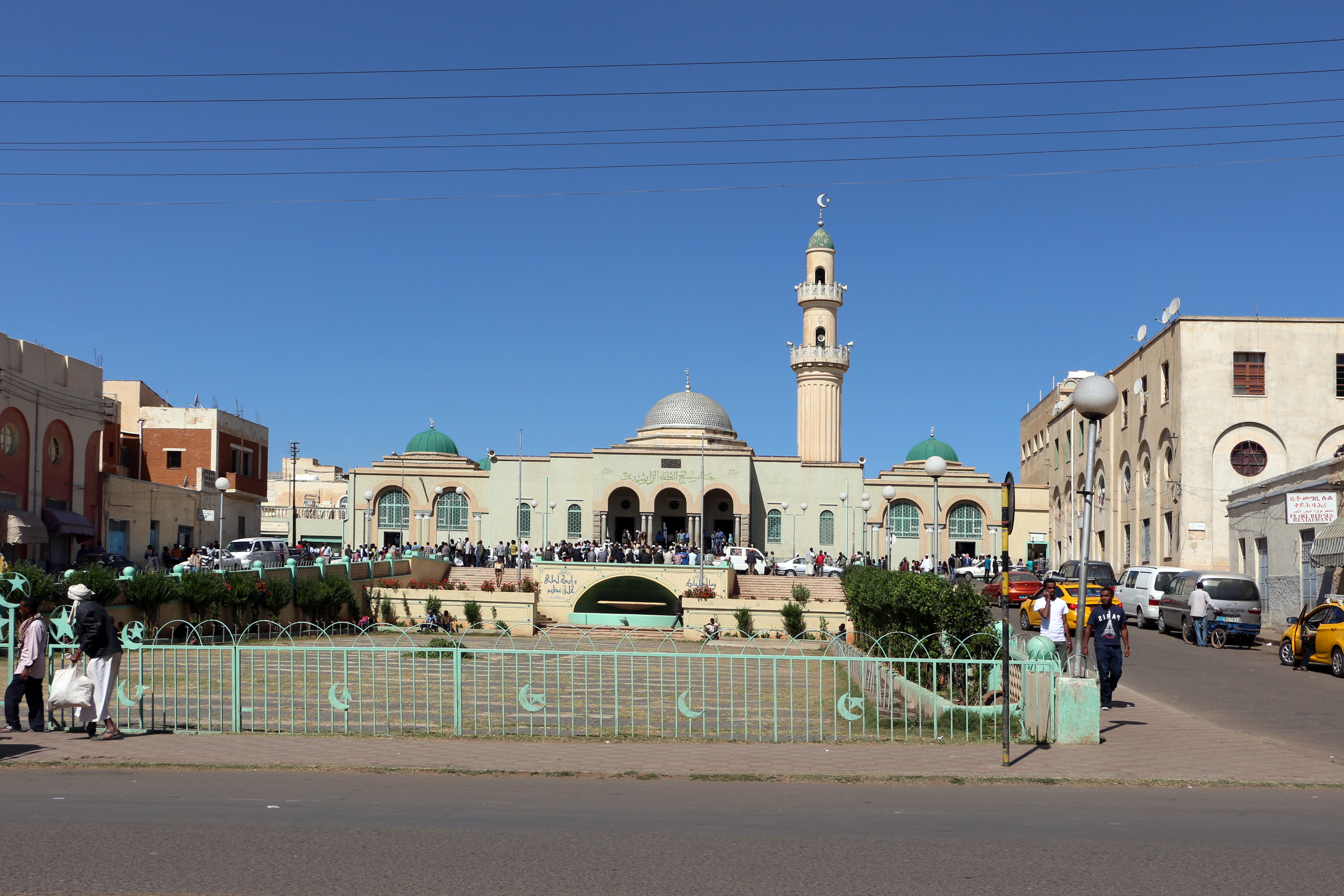
The Great Mosque of Asmara

The history of Islam in Eritrea can be traced back to the beginnings of the religion in the 7th century. In 615, some followers of Muhammad were said to have arrived at Massawa to seek refuge. Soon, Muslims settled in the coasts of Eritrea and built mosques and other structures. However, it was until the early 8th century when the influence of Islam began to be strongly felt. The late 7th and early 8th centuries witnessed the rise of Islamic kingdoms in the Eritrean coast. By the 9th century, Islam had spread to the eastern coasts of Eritrea and some indigenous groups in the region began adopting the religion.

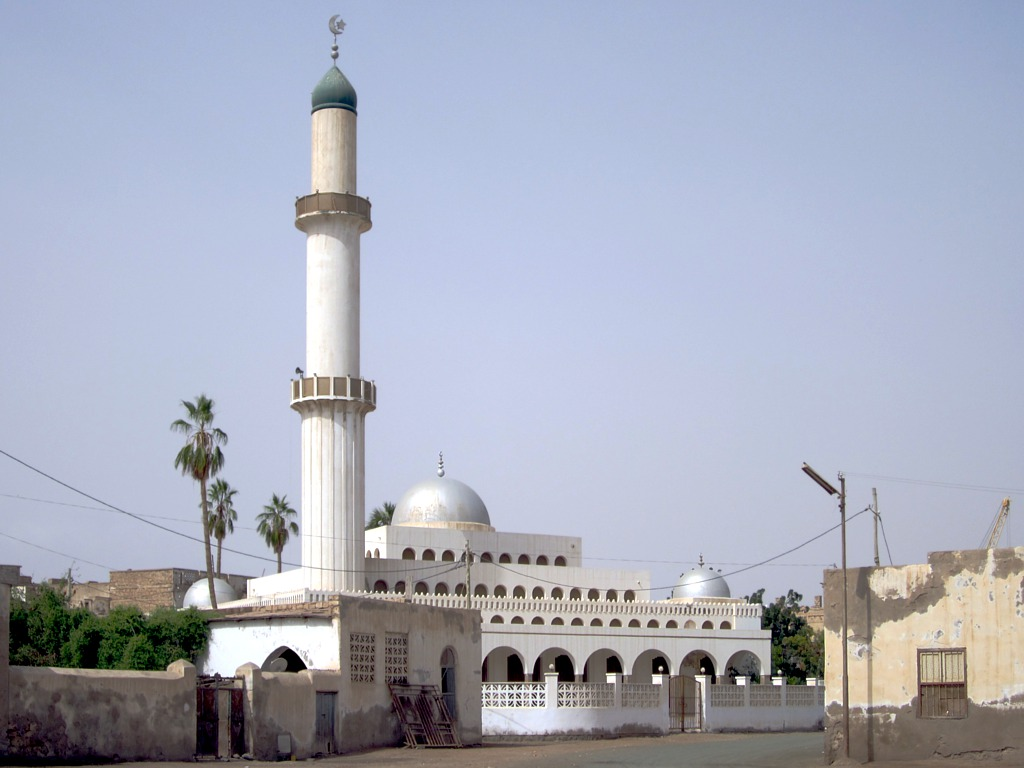
The 15th-century Sheikh Hanafi Mosque in Massawa

In the late 11th century, a Muslim sultanate was founded in Dahlak, which was a prosperous kingdom that had trading contacts with Ethiopia, Yemen, India, and Egypt. By the 13th century, numerous nomadic groups in Eritrea began adopting Islam and helped further propagate the faith. By the 15th century, Islam was well established and integrated among many Eritreans.

Islam later spread in Eritrea under the Ottoman Empire when ethnic groups like the Tigre people in mainland Eritrea began converting to Islam. Many of the inland Tigres converted to Islam in the 19th century as well as some of the Bilen. In the late 19th century, during the reign of Emperor Yohannes IV, who was a devoutly Christian Tigrayan, Muslim Tigrayans were forcibly expelled from their homes and found refuge in the nearby northern areas in what is now Eritrea, out of reach of royal Ethiopian authority.

== Judaism ==
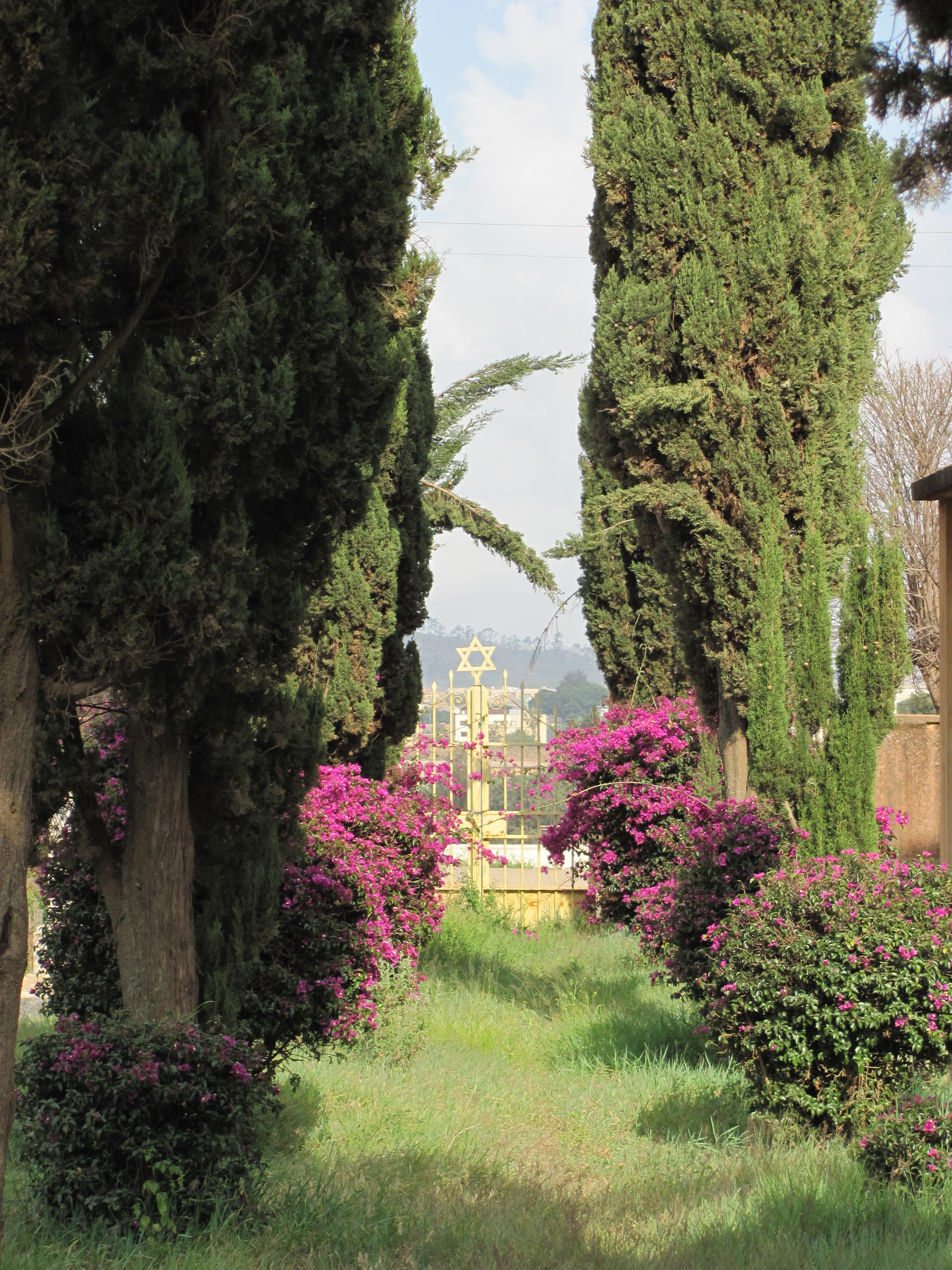
A Jewish cemetery in Asmara

It is believed that before Christianity became the official religion of Abyssinia (ancient Eritrea and northern Ethiopia) in the 4th century, Judaism had a heavy presence in Eritrea. Those who refused to embrace the new religion were compelled to seek refuge in the mountains of southern Ethiopia. This explains the concentration of Jews known as Beta Israel or Falasha in Gondar, Ethiopia and southern Tigray. However, there was not much oppression against ethnic Jews.

The present Eritrean Jewish community is believed to be started by Yemenite Jews from Yemen attracted by new commercial opportunities driven by Italian colonial expansion in the late 19th century. The Jewish population then later increased from European refugees coming to Eritrea to escape the anti-Semitic regimes in Europe at the time. Many emigrated to Israel in 1948. During British administration, Eritrea was often used as a location of exile for Irgun and Lehi guerrillas. Among those imprisoned were future Israeli prime minister Yitzhak Shamir and Haim Corfu, a founder of Beitar Jerusalem. In 1961 the Eritrean War of Independence began after Eritrea was annexed by Ethiopia. It was then that Jews began to leave Eritrea. In the early 1970s, Jewish emigration increased because of ensuing violence between Eritrea and Ethiopia (up to and beyond Eritrea's official declaration of independence in 1993). Judaism is not one of the four religions recognized by the Eritrean government and indeed, as of 2006 there was only one last native Jew left in Eritrea – Sami Cohen, who tends to the Asmara Synagogue and cemetery.

== Religious affiliation by geography and by ethnic group ==
According to a 2018 report from the United States Department of State, the population in southern and central Eritrea is primarily Christian, while the population of northern Eritrea is primarily Muslim. According to that same report, the Tigrinya ethnic group are primarily Christian, while the Tigre and the Rashaida groups are primarily Muslim.

The majority of Christians are found in the Eritrean Highlands found in southern, central and parts of northern Eritrea. A majority of the Tigrinya who constitute almost 60% of the population are Christian. The majority of the Kunama are Catholic, with a small minority of Muslims and some who practice traditional indigenous religions. Approximately 40% of the Bilen are Christian, the majority being Catholic.

The majority of Muslims in Eritrea inhabit the eastern, coastal lowlands as well as the western lowlands near the border with Sudan. Most belong to various Afroasiatic communities, especially the Tigre, Saho, Afar, Rashaida, Beja and Bilen ethnic groups. About 5% of the Tigrinya are also Muslims; they are known as the Jeberti, though they claim a different ethnic background from the Biher-Tigrinya; the Rashaida are an Arab tribe who migrated from the Hejaz region of Saudi Arabia in the 19th century. Additionally, the majority of the Nilo-Saharan-speaking Nara ethnic minorities also adhere to Islam, as do some of the Kunama Nilotes.

== Legal framework and restrictions ==
The Eritrean constitution provides for the freedom of thought, conscience, and belief; and guarantees the right to practice and manifest any religion. The constitution has not been implemented since its ratification in 1997. Since the constitution has not been implemented, the Proclamation to legally standardize and articulate religious institutions and activities is provided in Proclamation No. 73/1995 of 1995. Although Proclamation No. 73/1995 clearly enshrines the strict principle of secularism, it also states that every Eritrean national's right of freedom of thought, conscience and belief is guaranteed and respected by the law.

However, Proclamation No. 73/1995 also defines that: 1) religious activities are not spread with seduction but with understanding and belief (thus explaining the hostile stance toward new religious movement and evangelical Christian group proselytism); and that 2) religious activities are carried out in accordance with and respects the law of the nation and particularly preserves the peace, stability, and unity of the people and the country.

Moreover, the Proclamation is also clear on the fact that (due to the secular principles) the relation as between the government and religion and religious institutions, as well as policies that deal with religious institutions should be formulated in accordance with the law. Pursuant to this Proclamation there is the establishment of the Department of Religious Affairs within the Ministry of Internal Affairs. This is tasked with regulating religious activities and institutions. The Proclamation emphasizes that religions and religious institutions must not engage in political activities or comment on political issues which would hamper the secular character of the State. The decree additionally prohibits religious groups from initiating or offering social services based on sectarian parameters.

The Proclamation requires religious groups to register with the government or cease activities. Members of religious groups that are unregistered or otherwise not in compliance with the law are subject to penalties under the provisional penal code. The Office of Religious Affairs has authority to regulate religious activities and institutions, including approval of the applications of religious groups seeking official recognition.

Religious groups must renew their registration every year. In 2002, the Roman Catholic Church and the Evangelical Lutheran Church of Eritrea (affiliated with the Lutheran World Federation) were required to submit registration applications and cease religious activities and services until applications were approved.

== Treatment of unregistered religious groups ==
On 25 October 1994, the government revoked the business licenses of Jehovah’s Witnesses due to their refusal to recognize “the temporal government” and take part in the referendum on independence. Jehovah's Witnesses have also refused to participate in national service. Political neutrality and conscientious objection to military service are key aspects of faith for Jehovah’s Witnesses. While national service in Eritrea does include a civil component, all Eritreans are required to undertake military training and Eritreans cannot generally choose which type of service they will perform. Since the decree was issued, Jehovah’s Witnesses have been barred from obtaining government-issued identity and travel documents (required for legal recognition of marriages or land purchases); or obtaining government jobs; as well as securing business licenses.

== Persecution of Jehovah's Witnesses ==
As of April 2026, around 64 Jehovah's Witnesses are currently imprisoned in Eritrea. From 1994 to April 2026, all except one have been held without formal charges or a hearing. Three of Jehovah's Witnesses were imprisoned for 26 years, beginning in September 1994, until their release in December 2020 along with 25 other Jehovah's Witnesses. On September 27, 2024, Eritrean authorities raided a private home where a meeting of Jehovah’s Witnesses was being held. The police made 24 arrests: 6 brothers, 16 sisters, and 2 minor children. Three days later, the authorities returned and arrested the 85-year-old sister who lives in the home. The 2 minor children were later released, while the 23 adults were transferred to the Mai Serwa Prison.
