= Fesseha Giyorgis Abiye Egzi =

Tigrinya-language writer, historian and theologian (1868–1931)

- ፍሥሓ ጊዮርጊስ ዓብየ እግዚእ
- Born: 1868; Yeha, near Adwa, Ethiopian Empire
- Died: 1931 (aged 62–63); Addi Zenu, Seraye, Italian Eritrea
- Occupations: Writer; historian; theologian; teacher; translator
- Writing career
- Language: Tigrinya, Amharic
- Notable works: Ṭoblaḥta (1895); Tarik Ityop'iya (published 1987); Enkab ʿAräbñña Etägälbäṭä Qǝya Qädamot Aʿrabn Enkab Iṭalya Etägälbäṭä Tarik Agbaṣn (1897)

Däbtära Fesseha Giyorgis Abiyäzgi (Tigrinya: ፍሥሓ ጊዮርጊስ ዓብየ እግዚእ, romanized: Fǝśśǝḥa Giyorgis ʿAbiyä Ǝgzi; (Note: Also written as Fesseha Giyorgis Abiyä Egzi) c. 1868 – c. 1931) was a Tigrinya-language writer, historian and theologian from Yeha, in the Tigray. Educated as a Däbtära, he later taught Ethiopian languages in Italy and combined Ethiopian ecclesiastical learning with knowledge acquired from European and Arabic sources.

Fesseha is regarded as a foundational figure in the development of modern written Tigrinya. Bairu Tafla describes him as the founder of the Tigrinya literary tradition, while Hailu Habtu characterizes him as the "father of Tigrinya literature". His 1895 account of his voyage from Ethiopia to Italy has been described as the first secular text published in Tigrinya and as the earliest known travelogue in Ethiopian literature.

== Early life and education ==
Fesseha was born in 1868 at Yeha, in the vicinity of Adwa. Hailu Habtu, while confirming Yeha as his birthplace, notes that the precise date of his birth is unknown. Little information survives about his childhood or family.

He appears to have received an advanced traditional Ethiopian Orthodox education in his home region. Bairu Tafla suggests that he may also have studied in monasteries in what is now Eritrea, including Debre Maryam and Debre Bizen. His later designation as a däbtära indicates his place within the traditional learned and ecclesiastical culture of the Ethiopian Orthodox Tewahedo Church.

By the late 1880s Fesseha had travelled from the Adwa region to the Red Sea port of Massawa. The precise reason for his departure is unknown. Tafla suggests that it may have been connected with the devastating Great Ethiopian Famine of 1888–1892, during which large numbers of highlanders sought food in Massawa, where imported grain was available through the Italian colonial administration.

Fesseha was certainly in Massawa by 1889. By then he had established contacts with Count Pietro Antonelli and other Italian officials.

== Journey with Ras Makonnen ==
At the end of 1889, Fesseha accompanied Ras Makonnen Wolde Mikael from Massawa into the Ethiopian highlands. According to Tafla, he apparently travelled on behalf of the Italians and probably acted as an interpreter and guide.

The party travelled from Massawa through Asmara, Seraye, Adwa and Hawzen before reaching Mekelle. Fesseha later incorporated a detailed eyewitness description of this journey and of the violent events he witnessed into his history of Ethiopia.

The journey occurred during a decisive period in Ethiopian history. After the death of Emperor Yohannes IV in 1889, Menelik II had assumed the imperial throne, while the political situation in northern Ethiopia remained unsettled. Once Ras Makonnen joined the newly crowned Menelik II, Fesseha returned to Massawa.

== Italy ==
=== Journey to Italy ===
In 1890 Fesseha left Massawa for Italy. His later travel account begins with his recollections of Massawa and records his voyage across the Red Sea and Mediterranean world to Italy.

His principal intellectual patron in Italy was the Orientalist Francesco Gallina, who encouraged both the teaching and publication of Tigrinya. Under Gallina's auspices, Fesseha became associated with the Oriental Institute in Naples, where he taught Ge'ez, Tigrinya and Amharic.

His years in Italy broadened his linguistic education. In addition to the Ethiopian languages in which he had already been trained, he studied Italian, Latin and Arabic. According to Tafla, this gave him access to foreign works dealing with Ethiopia.

Fesseha's own preface to his travel account indicates that Gallina played a central role in encouraging his literary activity. Fesseha stated that he was writing partly in order to provide texts for people interested in learning Tigrinya. He also referred to his work on Ethiopian genealogies, ancient towns and place names, emperors and princes, customs, and materials translated from Arabic with the assistance of his Arabic teacher.

== Works ==
Hailu Habtu states that Fesseha composed at least five works in Tigrinya. Three works are particularly well documented: his travelogue, his general history of Ethiopia, and his history of the Arabs and Egyptians. He also wrote, or is believed to have written, in Amharic.

=== Impressions (Ṭoblaḥta) ===
Fesseha's first published work was his account of his voyage from Ethiopia to Italy, issued in Rome in 1895. The work was later republished under the Tigrinya title ጦብላሕታ (Ṭoblaḥta, "Impressions"), with the expanded sense "Impressions: An Account of a Voyage from Ethiopia to Italy".

The original publication is catalogued as:

Notizie del viaggio di un Etiopico dall'Etiopia all'Italia, Rome, 1895.

The text originated at the encouragement of scholars associated with the Oriental Institute and was intended in part to provide reading material for students of Tigrinya.

The work is a short first-person account of Fesseha's journey from Massawa to Italy in the summer of 1890. It combines geographical observation, autobiographical narration and descriptions of people and places encountered during the journey.

Its significance is principally literary. Tafla states that scholars subsequently regarded it as the first impressive literary work in Tigrinya. Hailu Habtu goes further, describing it as the first secular text known to have been published in Tigrinya and as the first known travelogue in Ethiopian literature.

The Cultural Association of Tigray republished the Tigrinya text in 1998 with financial assistance from the Maison des Études Éthiopiennes, later the French Center for Ethiopian Studies. Hailu Habtu subsequently published an English translation in the Annales d'Éthiopie in 2000.

=== History of Ethiopia (Tarikh Ityop'iya) ===
Fesseha's most substantial historical work is ታሪኽ ኢትዮጵያ (Tarik Ityop'iya, "History of Ethiopia"). It was composed in Tigrinya toward the end of the nineteenth century and covers Ethiopian history from traditional accounts of the country's origins down to approximately 1890.

The manuscript remained unpublished for most of the twentieth century. Yaqob Beyene prepared an edition of the Tigrinya text accompanied by an Italian translation, published in Naples in 1987 as Fesseha Giyorgis: Storia d'Etiopia.

The work is important both as a historical source and as an early specimen of extended Tigrinya prose. Beyene noted that, although Fesseha originated from Yeha near Adwa, the language of the manuscript displays features associated with the Tigrinya of Akele Guzai in Eritrea. The text is consequently of interest for the historical study of Tigrinya dialects as well as for Ethiopian historiography.

Tafla describes Fesseha's interpretation of Ethiopia's earlier history as predominantly traditional, but considers his presentation systematic and lucid. Fesseha's geographical perspective was also unusual in comparison with much earlier Ethiopian historical writing. Historians writing in Gondar, Gojjam and Shewa had frequently concentrated on their own regions, leaving events in the northern highlands comparatively underrepresented. Tafla therefore considers Fesseha's work to fill an important gap in Ethiopian historiography.

The later sections also possess a different character from the legendary and traditional narratives of earlier periods, since Fesseha wrote about events close to his own lifetime and, in several cases, events he had personally witnessed. His account of his journey with Ras Makonnen in 1889 is among these eyewitness sections.

The work has continued to be used as a historical source for northern Ethiopia. In 2024, Jan Nyssen translated a section concerning warfare, massacre and famine in Tigray in 1889.

=== History of the Arabs and Egyptians ===
In 1897 Fesseha published another Tigrinya historical text in Rome, originally called "Account of the Ancient Arabs translated from Arabic and History of Egypt translated from Italian" (Tigrinya: እንካብ ዓረብኛ እተገልበጠ ቅያ ቀዳሞት ኣዕራብን እንካብ ኢጣልያ እተገልበጠ ታሪኽ ኣግባጽን, romanized: Enkab ʿAräbñña Etägälbäṭä Qǝya Qädamot Aʿrabn Enkab Iṭalya Etägälbäṭä Tarik Agbaṣn).

The work was catalogued in Italian as Storia degli Arabi e degli Egiziani tradotta in lingua tigrai ("History of the Arabs and Egyptians translated into the Tigrinya language"), Rome, 1897.

Unlike the travelogue, it was not entirely an original composition. Tafla describes it as combining translated material with Fesseha's own writing. Its production was facilitated by Fesseha's study of Arabic and Italian while in Italy. In his preface to the travelogue, he had already explained that he had begun translating material relating to Ethiopia from Arabic into Tigrinya with the assistance of his Arabic teacher.

=== Amharic writings and the Zäwäldi attribution ===
Fesseha also appears to have written in Amharic. The Encyclopaedia Aethiopica states that a number of tracts attributed to him were published in 1899–1900 under the pen name Zäwäldi.

Hailu Habtu discusses an Amharic historical work published in Rome in 1899 under the name Aleqa Zäwäld, which he translates as The Former and Later Ethiopia. According to Habtu, Lanfranco Ricci and Yaqob Beyene compared this text with Fesseha's Tigrinya writings and concluded that Aleqa Zäwäld was probably a pseudonym used by Fesseha. If the attribution is correct, it would also place Fesseha among the pioneers of modern secular prose in Amharic.

== Historical thought and method ==
Fesseha occupied a transitional position between traditional Ethiopian historiography and newer forms of historical scholarship developing at the end of the nineteenth century. His education had been rooted in the Ethiopian ecclesiastical tradition, and his treatment of remote antiquity continued to make substantial use of traditional genealogical and historical narratives.

His time in Italy nevertheless exposed him to European scholarship and to sources in Arabic, Italian and Latin. His writings consequently brought together material from Ethiopian traditions, translated foreign sources and his own observations.

This combination is particularly visible in Tarik Ityop'iya. Its earliest sections rely heavily on traditional explanations of Ethiopian origins, whereas its treatment of nineteenth-century events becomes increasingly contemporary and eyewitness-based. Fesseha was thus able to record developments in northern Ethiopia that had often received comparatively little attention in historical works produced farther south.

His interest in language was similarly central to his historical writing. His stated desire to produce material for people learning Tigrinya meant that literary production, historical research and linguistic instruction were closely interconnected in his work.

== Later life ==
The chronology of Fesseha's life after his years in Italy is poorly documented. It is not known exactly when he returned to Eritrea, what occupation he followed after his return, or whether he continued to write.

He ultimately spent more than two-thirds of his life in Eritrea. He died in 1931 at the village of Addi Zenu in Seraye.

The scarcity of information concerning these later decades contrasts with the importance subsequently assigned to his writings. Much of what is known about him derives from his own works, their later editors and the reconstruction of his career by scholars of Ethiopian and Eritrean literary history.

== Legacy ==
Fesseha is particularly significant for the emergence of Tigrinya as a language of extended secular prose. Written Tigrinya existed before his publications, including religious texts, translations and linguistic materials produced in connection with missionary and European scholarly activity. His work nevertheless represented a significant development toward original literary and historical composition by a native Tigrinya-speaking author.

For this reason, literary historians have repeatedly placed him at the beginning of the modern Tigrinya literary tradition. Tafla calls him its founder, Habtu describes him as its father, and Ghirmai Negash treats his writings as an important point of departure in the development of modern Tigrinya literature.

His significance also extends beyond literary history. Tarik Ityop'iya provides evidence for the development and regional variation of written Tigrinya, while its nineteenth-century chapters preserve information on political, military and social events in northern Ethiopia from the perspective of an author who experienced some of them personally.

His career also illustrates the interaction between Ethiopian traditional scholarship and European Oriental studies in the late nineteenth century. As a traditionally trained däbtära who taught Ge'ez, Tigrinya and Amharic in Naples while himself studying Italian, Latin and Arabic, Fesseha participated directly in the early institutional study of Ethiopian languages in Europe.

== Selected works ==
- ጦብላሕታ (Ṭoblaḥta, "Impressions"), travel account originally published in Rome in 1895 as Notizie del viaggio di un Etiopico dall'Etiopia all'Italia; republished in Tigrinya in 1998.
- ታሪኽ ኢትዮጵያ (Tarik Ityop'iya, "History of Ethiopia"), written in the late nineteenth century; edited with an Italian translation by Yaqob Beyene as Fesseha Giyorgis: Storia d'Etiopia, Naples, 1987.
- እንካብ ዓረብኛ እተገልበጠ ቅያ ቀዳሞት ኣዕራብን እንካብ ኢጣልያ እተገልበጠ ታሪኽ ኣግባጽን (Enkab ʿAräbñña Etägälbäṭä Qǝya Qädamot Aʿrabn Enkab Iṭalya Etägälbäṭä Tarik Agbaṣn), published in Rome in 1897 as Storia degli Arabi e degli Egiziani tradotta in lingua tigrai.
- The Former and Later Ethiopia, Amharic historical work published in Rome in 1899 under the name Aläqa Zäwäld and attributed to Fesseha on the basis of textual comparison by Lanfranco Ricci and Yaqob Beyene.

== See also ==
- Tigrinya literature
- Tigrinya language
- Ethiopian literature
- History of Ethiopia
- Yeha
