= Great Mosque of Asmara =

Mosque in Asmara, Central, Eritrea

- جَامِع ٱلْخُلَفَاء ٱلرَّاشِدِيْن
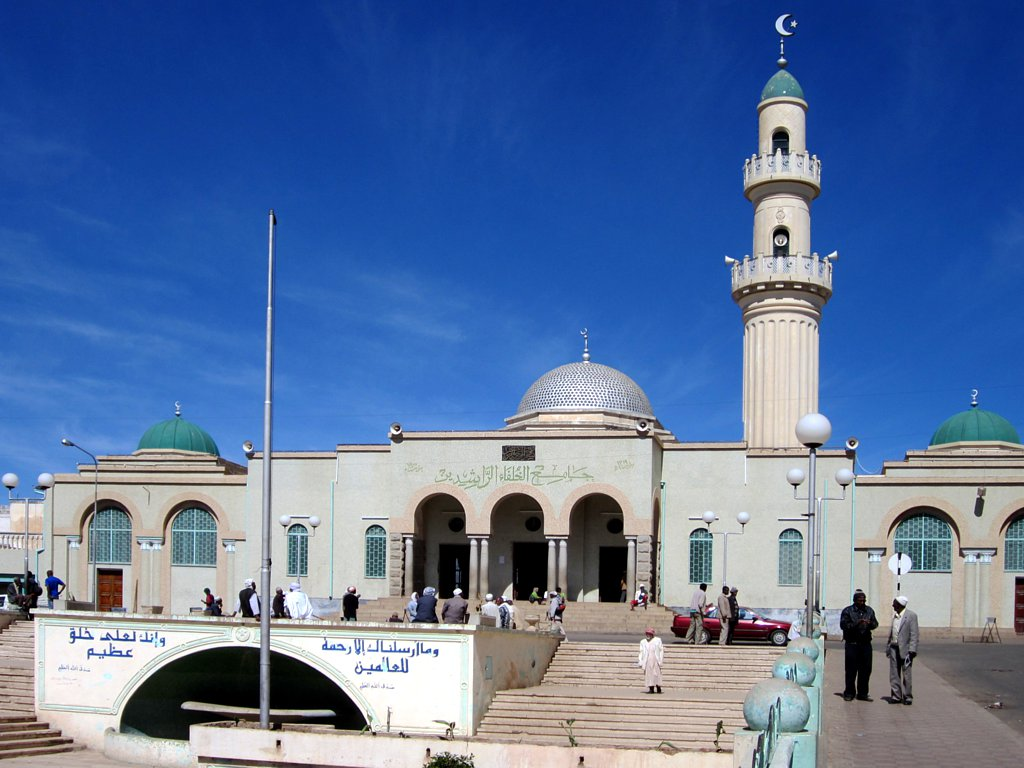

- Location of the mosque in Eritrea

Religion
- Affiliation: Islam
- Ecclesiastical or organizational status: Mosque
- Status: Active

Location
- Location: Asmara, Central
- Country: Eritrea
- Interactive map of Great Mosque of Asmara
- Coordinates: 15°20′20″N 38°56′30″E

Architecture
- Architect: Guido Ferrazza
- Type: Mosque
- Style: Rationalist; Neoclassical; Islamic
- Founder: Benito Mussolini
- Completed: 1938

Specifications
- Dome: 3 (maybe more)
- Minaret: 1
- Materials: Dekemhare travertine, Carrara marble, black stone

The Great Mosque of Asmara; also known as Al Kulafah Al Rashidan, Al Kulafah Al Rashidin, Al Kuaka Al Rashidin or Al Khulafa Al Rashiudin (Arabic: جَامِع ٱلْخُلَفَاء ٱلرَّاشِدِيْن, romanized: Jāmiʿ al-Khulafāʾ ar-Rāshidīn, lit. 'Mosque of the Rightly-Guided Caliphs'); is a mosque located in the center of Asmara, the capital city of Eritrea. It is considered one of the three prominent edifices of the city, along with Church of Our Lady of the Rosary and Enda Mariam Coptic Cathedral. Designed by Guido Ferrazza, it was built in 1938 on the initiative of Benito Mussolini, to impress the Muslim population, who comprise approximately half of the local population. The Arabic phrase al-Khulafā’ ar-Rāshidīn can mean "followers of the right path".

The mosque is located within Asmara City that, in 2017, became the first modernist city to be added to the UNESCO World Heritage List.

== Overview ==
Completed in 1936, the huge mosque complex is a combination of rational, classical and Islamic styles. The interior of the mosque is open only to Muslims, and people of all faiths are allowed to enter through the main entrance.

== Architecture ==
The mosque was designed by Guido Ferrazza in a blend of the Rationalist, Neoclassical, and Islamic architectural styles. The minaret at its end, fluted and of Roman design, is visible from all parts of the city. It has two platforms and two balconies of the Italian rococo or late baroque style. Below the minaret, the mosque's fascia has a neoclassical loggia (exterior galleries), which is split in three parts. The building's double columns are made from Dekemhare travertine and are fitted with capitals made of Carrara marble. Other features include Islamic domes and arches. The mosque's mihrab is made of Carrara marble. Additional marble from the same quarry is used in other areas of this mosque. The front sahn is covered with black stone slabs set in geometrical design.

The Eritrean mosque serves as a symbol of national unity for the country's 42% Sunni Muslims, who, from different parts of the country, regularly come to the mosque for prayers, and the participation is significant during the month of Ramadan and the Friday prayers.

== See also ==
- Islam in Eritrea
- List of mosques in Eritrea
- List of World Heritage Sites in Eritrea
