= Christianity in Eritrea =

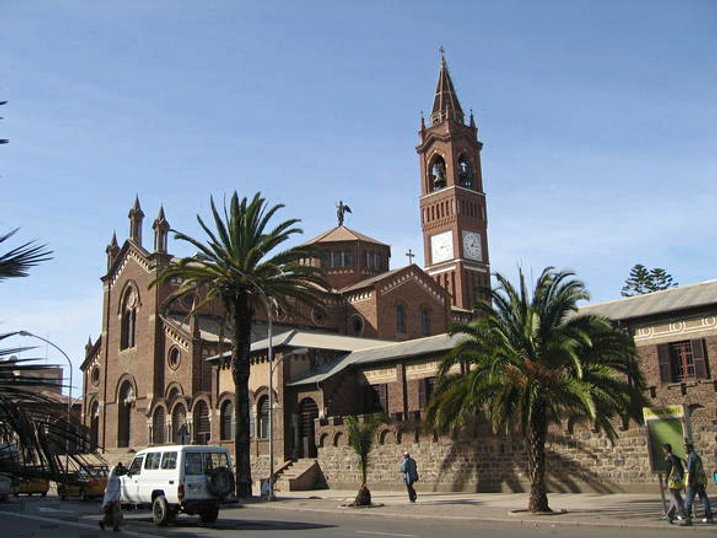
Roman Catholic Church of Our Lady of the Rosary in Asmara

Eritrea as a country and the Eritrean community are multi-religious; Eritrea has two dominant religions: Christianity and Islam, with various estimates placing Christianity (all denominations) as the religion of around 63% of the population of Eritrea. Eritrean Christians are primarily followers of Oriental Orthodoxy, with a much smaller segment are members of the Catholic Church, and less than one percent of the population following P'ent'ay Evangelicalism.

== History ==
The Kingdom of Aksum, which overlapped with what is now Eritrea, was the first African Christian country in the world having officially adopted Christianity as the state religion in the 4th century and Christianity is the oldest world religion practiced in the country. One of oldest monasteries in the country Debre Sina dates back to the 4th century, it is one of the oldest monasteries in Africa and the world. Christians in Eritrea constitute to three main groups; the Eritrean Orthodox Tewahedo Church, the Catholic Church (predominantly of the Eritrean Catholic Church), and the Evangelical Church (not recognized by government). The Catholic dioceses in Eritrea are the Eparches of Asmara, Barentu, Keren and Segeneiti. In 2002, Isaias Afwerki, the president of Eritrea, declared all independent Protestant Churches enemies of the state. For this reason, more than 2000 independent Protestants are detained due to their faith.

== Oriental Orthodoxy in Eritrea ==
The Ethiopian Orthodox Tewahedo Church was granted autocephaly by Pope Joseph II of Alexandria, head of the Coptic Orthodox Church of Alexandria in 1950. At that time Eritrea was regarded as a province of Ethiopia, so the Coptic Church in Eritrea was simply a division of the Ethiopian Orthodox Tewahedo Church.

Following the independence of Eritrea from Ethiopia in 1993, the newly independent Eritrean government appealed to Pope Shenouda III of the Coptic Orthodox Church of Alexandria for Eritrean Orthodox autocephaly.

Tensions were high between the Ethiopian Orthodox Tewahedo Church and the Eritrean Orthodox Tewahedo Church, and no representative from the Ethiopian Orthodox Tewahedo Church attended the official recognition of the newly autocephalous body. However, the Ethiopian Church has recognized the autocephalous status of the Church of Eritrea although it objected to the method in which the Coptic Church went about granting it. Eritrea's first two Patriarchs were originally Archbishops of the Ethiopian Orthodox Tewahedo Church, and the first Patriarch, Abune Phillipos did visit Addis Ababa during joint efforts by the two Churches to explore a possible resolution to a border conflict that had broken out between the two countries in 1998. The two churches, remain in full communion with each another and with the other Churches of Oriental Orthodoxy, although the Ethiopian Orthodox Tewahedo Church, along with the Coptic Orthodox Church have not recognized the deposition of the third Patriarch of Eritrea, and the enthronement of the fourth Patriarch.

The first Patriarch of Eritrea was Abune Phillipos who died in 2004 and was succeeded by Abune Yacob. The reign of Abune Yacob as Patriarch of Eritrea was very brief as he died not long after his enthronement, and he was succeeded by Abune Antonios as 3rd Patriarch of Eritrea.

Abune Antonios was elected on 5 March 2004, and enthroned as the third Patriarch of Orthodox Tewahedo Church of Eritrea on 2004-04-24. Pope Shenouda III presided at the ceremony in Asmara, together with the Holy Synod of the Eritrean Orthodox Church and a Coptic Orthodox Church delegation.

In August 2005, the Patriarch of Orthodox Tewahedo Church of Eritrea, Abune Antonios, was confined to a strictly ceremonial role. In a letter dated 2006-01-13 Patriarch Abune Antonios was informed that following several sessions of the church's Holy Synod, he had been formally deposed. In a written response that was widely published the Patriarch rejected the grounds of his dismissal, questioned the legitimacy of the synod, and excommunicated two signatories to the 13 January letter, including Yoftahe Dimetros, whom the Patriarch identified as being responsible for the church's recent upheavals. Patriarch Antonios also appealed his case to the Council of the Monasteries of the Eritrean Orthodox Church and to the Coptic Orthodox Church of Alexandria. Abune Antonios was deposed by the Eritrean Holy Synod. Many believe that Abune Antonios was wrongly deposed and still consider him Patriarch. Many Eritrean Orthodox followers disagree with the Eritrean government making decisions in religious matters.

== Catholicism in Eritrea and Ethiopia ==
The Portuguese voyages of discovery at the end of the fifteenth century opened the way for direct contacts between the Catholic Church and the Ethiopian Orthodox Church. Due largely to the behaviour of the Portuguese Afonso Mendes whom Pope Urban VIII appointed as Patriarch of Ethiopia in 1622 and who was expelled from the country in 1636, these contacts, which had seemed destined for success, led instead to the complete closure of Ethiopia to further contact with Rome.

In 1839, Saint Justin de Jacobis arrived in the country as Prefect Apostolic of Ethiopia, in charge therefore of a Latin Church jurisdiction. He preferred instead to use the Ethiopic liturgical rite. Many Ethiopian priests were attracted to his sanctity and his teaching, thus giving rise to what became in 1930 the Ethiopic Catholic Church, when, in view of its continual growth, an ordinariate for the Ethiopic Rite faithful of Eritrea, entrusted to an Eritrean bishop, was established. Eritrea, an Italian possession since 1894, already had a separate ecclesiastical jurisdiction, headed by an Italian titular bishop, for Latin-rite Catholics, mainly Italians.

The Latin Church had become established in the south of Ethiopia in areas that had not been Christian and that were incorporated into the modern country only at the end of the nineteenth century. The Italian occupation of Ethiopia in 1936 gave rise to an increase in the number of Latin Church jurisdictions, but the expulsion of foreign missionaries at the end of the Second World War meant that the Ethiopic Rite clergy had to take responsibility for larger areas than before. Accordingly, in 1951, the Ethiopic Rite Apostolic Exarchate of Addis Ababa was established, and the ordinariate for Eritrea was elevated to the rank of exarchate. Ten years later, on 9 April 1961, an Ethiopic metropolia (ecclesiastical province) was established, with Addis Ababa as the metropolitan see and Asmara (in Eritrea) and Adigrat (in Ethiopia) as suffragan eparchies.

In 1995, two new eparchies, Barentu and Keren, were established in Eritrea, and the Latin Church apostolic vicariate was abolished. Eritrea thus became the only country where all Catholics, whatever their personal liturgical rite, belong to an Eastern Catholic jurisdiction. In 2003, one more eparchy was created in Endibir in the Southern Nations, Nationalities and Peoples' Region of Ethiopia, and on Friday, February 24, 2012, Pope Benedict XVI erected the new Eparchy of Segheneity. The Ethiopic Catholic Metropolitan Church now consists of seven sees, three in Ethiopia and four in Eritrea. There are also Latin-Rite jurisdictions in the south of Ethiopia, none of them raised to the rank of diocese. Eight are apostolic vicariates, headed by a titular bishop; one is an apostolic prefecture, headed by a priest.

Geʽez, a Semitic language fallen out of daily use several centuries ago, is the liturgical language of the Ethiopic Church, whose liturgy is based on the Coptic.

== Protestantism in Eritrea ==
Protestants in Eritrea number about 91,232, which represents 2% of the population. The Evangelical Lutheran Church is the only recognised Protestant Church. Torture is used against independent Protestants in Eritrea causing more than 2000 Christians being subject to arrest in 2006. The U.S. State Department names it a Country of Particular Concern due to its violation of religious liberty. It has been reported that entire families are thrown into jail.

In 2009, International Christian Concern said that over 3,000 Christians were being held prisoner in Eritrea, and alleged a December 2009 mass arrest of 30 mostly elderly women who were praying together in a house. According to the Barnabas Fund, in April 2010 a 28-year-old student died after she was held in a metal shipping container for 2 years, after being arrested for attending a Protestant Bible study.

Eritrea is included in the Episcopal Area of the Horn of Africa of the Anglican Diocese of Egypt, though there are no current congregations in the country.

== Freedom of religion ==
In 2023, the country was scored 1 out of 4 for religious freedom. This was seen as an improvement, as several religious prisoners had been released in the previous months.

In the same year, the country was rated as the 4th worst place in the world to be a Christian.

== See also ==
- Religion in Eritrea
- Christianity in Ethiopia

== Sources ==
- Grillmeier, Aloys; Hainthaler, Theresia (1996). Christ in Christian Tradition: The Church of Alexandria with Nubia and Ethiopia after 451. Vol. 2/4. Louisville: Westminster John Knox Press. ISBN 9780664223007.
