= Debre Merqorewos =

Monastery in Areza, Eritrea

Debre Merqorewos is a monastery near the town of Areza in the Debub region of Eritrea. It was founded during the same time period as Debre Mariam. Among the monastery's notable qualities are its age and its association with the House of Ewostatewos. It maintained its land holdings until they were nationalized by the Derg during the Eritrean War of Independence.

== See also ==
- List of Eritrean Orthodox monasteries
