= Debre Sina =

Debre Sina (Ge'ez ደብረ ሲና Dabra Sīnā, modern Debre Sīnā, "Mount Sinai") is the name of a number of places in Eritrea and Ethiopia.

- Debre Sina (church), a church near Gorgora, on the northern shore of Lake Tana
- Debre Sina (Eritrea), a monastery in Anseba Region, near Keren
- Debre Sina (island), an island of Lake Zway
- Debre Sina (woreda), a woreda in the Amhara Region
- Debre Sina, Ethiopia, a town
- Debre Sina Monastery (Ethiopia), a monastery in Gojjam province (modern day Amhara Region)
