= Bur Province =

Former province of Eritrea

Bur (Tigrinya: ቡር) was a large (vaguely delimited) historical province, across the present-day Ethio-Eritrean border. As happened with other regions, it was divided into Upper Bur and Lower Bur. Its territory covered parts of Agame, the entire Akele Guzay and lands further to the east, including perhaps even the Buri peninsula.

The hagiography of Zemikael Aregawi narrates the people of Bur's rebellion against Kaleb. The same rebellion is recalled by the hagiographic tradition of the Sadqan, the "Righteous ones", who, before going to Metera, Bereknaha, Sorya, etc., together reached the "desert of Bur". Later, some other hagiographies indicate that from the 14th century Bur fell into the sphere of the Ewostateans' religious movement.

In the first half of the 15th century. Bur seems to have been ruled by a shum, whom atse Zera Yaqob put under the supremacy of the baher negash, along with the governors of Shire, Hamasen and Seraye. In the time of atse Lebna Dengel, the office of shum was occupied by Zamal, who, being a favorite of the Emperor, fought with him against Ahmad Ibrahim al-Gazi and was killed on 11 March 1529 in the battle at Sembara Kare.

After the defeat of Baher Negash Yashaq in 1578, Bur fell under the rule of the Tigray mekonnen. The Turks, who tried to invade Bur, were beaten back and the head of their commander was sent to atse Gelawdewos. During the reign of atse Susanyos, however, challengers of the central secular and ecclesiastic authorities and "pretenders to the throne", such as Yaqob, and the false "Melkite" metropolitan, appear to have found some support among the ethnically and religiously heterogenous population of Bur. As a result, the Emperor sent punitive expeditions against Bur.

As a coastal region, Bur was obviously of some economic importance for the emperors. Bur appears in the Chronicle of atse Iyasu II as a part of Tigray, called "the land of Bur which brings [the tribute of] 20 shekels of gold".

In the early 19th century Bur was visited by the missionary Samuel Gobat. He had a very low opinion of the locals, claiming that the region was "inhabited by rude and uncivilized mountaineers, living in a state of savage independence."
