= Bahta Hagos =

Eritrean resistance leader (died 1894)

Dejazmatch Bahta Hagos
- Died: December 19, 1894 Halay, Italian Eritrea
- Buried: Segheneyti
- Allegiance: Akele Guzay
- Conflicts: Battle of Halai

Bahta Hagos (Ge'ez: ባህታ ሓጎስ; died December 19, 1894), was Dejazmach of Akkele Guzay, and retrospectively considered an important leader of Eritrean resistance to foreign domination, and led a rebellion against the Italians at the Battle of Halai.

== Early career ==
He was born sometime between 1839 and 1850 into a rich peasant family in the town of Segheneyti, Akele Guzay. Bhata's parents, Hagos Andu and Weizro Wonau, were cattle farmers who owned land around the eastern escarpments of Akele Guzai. Like the majority of people around Segheneyti, Bahta was converted to Catholicism by the Italian missionary Giustino de Jacobis in the 1870s.

Bahta originally gained recognition in 1875 when he killed Embaye Araya, the son of Rasi Araya (the Governor of Tigray), in a skirmish precipitated by raiding of the area. Bahta and his brothers then became shiftas and made their base at Agameda in the Saho lowlands where they raided the caravans of Ras Alula. Despite the best efforts of Ras Alula's lieutenant Balatta Gabru, Bahta evaded capture and later in 1880, allied himself with the Egyptian garrison at Sanhit (latter Keren). In 1885, as an Italian colonial presence replaced the defeated Egyptians, and their control of Massawa, Bahta moved to ally himself with them and their provincial governor Oreste Baratieri. He was appointed capo di banda and granted the title of Dejazmatch. Bahta Hagos settled in his former camp of Agameda and fought against the raids of Fitawrari Dabbab Araya. Due to his Catholic faith—having been converted by Giustino de Jacobis in the late 1870s—and his record of service, Bahta Hagos was regarded by the Italians as one of their most loyal chiefs in Eritrea. As a consequence, Bahta came to control Akkele Guzay, and by 1889 his own forces formed an important flank in the Italian moves to create the Colony of Eritrea.

However Bahta became increasingly frustrated with the conduct of the Italian Colonial Government and their soldiers, particularly the expropriation of land from the clergy. He understood that Menelik was consolidating his power to the south with plans to displace the Italians. In June 1894, he, along with Ras Mengesha Yohannes and Ras Alula traveled to Addis Ababa to seek forgiveness from the Negus for their dealings with Baratieri. Menelik forgave them and offered Mengesha the crown of Tigray in exchange for his loyalty and help in evicting the Italians. The Tigrian leaders plotted against Baratieri while maintaining a guise of friendship with him. Bahta even led an army into the western province of Shiray on the pretext of fighting the Mahdists, but instead subjugated Kitet and started recruiting an even larger army.

== Rebellion against the Italians ==
In December 1894, Bahta unilaterally led his force of 1,600 men in direct revolt against the Italians, although he claimed support of Mengesha. He captured the Italian administrator at Segheneyti, which was then the capital of the province, and declared an independent Akkele Guzay. He proclaimed himself "An avenger of rights trampled on by the Italians". and also said "the Italians curse us, seize our land; I want to free you... let us drive the Italians out and be our own masters." On the 15th, the telegraph wires were cut from Segheneyti to Asmara, which the Italians had occupied since 1889, in order to give himself time to mobilize the population and bring Mengesha into the conflict. Baratieri immediately suspected Mengesha and ordered Major Toselli and his battalion to move on Segheneyti.

Upon arrival, the Major entered negotiations with Bahta, who stalled him with excuses and promises of loyalty. The Italian reinforcements started to arrive and by the evening of the 17th Toselli had 1500 men and two artillery pieces. He went to move against Bahta the following morning, but found him gone. Bahta had secretly abandoned Segheneyti in the night and had moved his force north against the Italian garrison of 220 men at the small fort of Halay, commanded by Captain Castellazzi. Toselli correctly guessed this was Bahta's plan, and marched his men towards Halay.

Bahta called for Castellazzi to surrender and abandon the fort. Negotiations continued until 13:30, when Bahta's patience came to an end and the attack was ordered. Low on ammunition, the Italians held out until 16:45, when the situation became critical. Toselli's forces arrived at that moment, and launched an attack on Bahta's rear. Bahta was killed in the attack, and his forces fled, many joining Mengesha. Mengesha's army would lose at the Battle of Coatit, but Menelik would soon commit his forces, and destroy the Italians at the Battle of Adwa, ending their colonial hopes for Ethiopia.

== Burial ==
Because of his influence, after his death his burial was banned by the Italian colonial government. They feared that his memorial would be nexus for further rebellion. His body was secretly buried at Halay, and later moved to Segheneyti in 1953. In 2007 he was interred once more in a newly constructed memorial with an honor guard in memory of his struggle.
