= List of Eritrean Orthodox monasteries =

This is a list of Eritrean Orthodox monasteries:

- Debre Bizen
- Debre Dehuhan
- Debre Libanos
- Debre Mariam
- Debre Merqorewos
- Debre Sina
- Debre Tsige (Abune Yonas)
- Debre Tsaeda Emba Selassi
- Debre Mawan
- Debre Kol (Enda Abune Buruk)
- Debre Tilul
- Gedam kudus Yohans( Tedrer)
- Gedam Abune Andrias (Liban)
- Debre Kudadu (Endabuxuamlak)
- Gedam Abune Ambes
