= Seraye =

Former province of Eritrea

Coordinates: 14°50′N 38°30′E

Seraye is the name of a former province of Eritrea. It has since been incorporated primarily into the Debub Region, though some western districts have become part of the Gash-Barka Region. The province was located west of Akele Guzai, south of Hamasien and north of Tigray.

== History ==
Even though Seraye has yielded fewer archaeological findings than the other two historical regions, Seraye is likely one of the oldest sites of Semitic settlement in the Eritrean highlands. This is suggested by the similarity of its name to South-Arabian place names, possibly due to Semitic immigrants from South Arabia (e.g., Sarwàn, Saràt, in the mountains of Yemen). Additionally, the rock inscription of Séhuf Émni in Qwahayn, written in Epigraphic South Arabian script indicates the region's significance during this period.

During the 9th century, Beja clans (who were also known Balaw or Belew, known locally as Belew Kelew) came to form the major ruling class in what would become Seraye and elsewhere in the northern highlands in what are now Eritrea and Tigray. The Beja integrated with the local largely Semitic-speaking population of the Highlands and adopted their language and custom. Despite the decline of the Kingdom of Aksum, the districts of Seraye, Akele Guzai and Hamasien were later under the control of the Christian Zagwe Dynasty, confirmation of this can be seen in a land grant by King Lalibela in the monastery of Debre Libanos near Senafe.

The first mention of the name "Seraye" comes from a land grant of Emperor Newaya Krestos (r. 1344–1372) granting two tracts of land to the convent of Abba Medhanina Egzi'e of Bankwal. Emperor Yeshaq (r. 1414–1429) granted another area in Seraye to the monastery of Debre Abbay. Although the area was spiritually tied to Aksum, it was also heavily influenced by the House of Ewostatewos, who was from Ger'alta in a more southerly district of Tigray. In the 14th century, members of the House of Ewostatewos founded the monastery of Debre Mariam in Seraye, which grew into an important center of learning.

During the reorganization of the Ethiopian government under Zara Yaqob (r. 1434–1468), the power of the Bahr Negash's power was greatly increased and elevated above the Shum/Seyums of Hamasien and Seraye. He also issued a charter granting land to the monastery of Debre Mariam in Seraye; Lebna Dengel (r. 1508–1540) also gave a land grant in Seraye, to a certain Habte Ab, whose position was not recorded. Moreover, Debarwa, the chief town of the Bahr Negash, is located in present-day Seraye, on the border between historical Seraye and Hamasien. It lies along the strategic route from Massawa on the Red Sea coast to the hinterland, passing through Seraye and Tigray.

Seraye was mentioned in the Futuh al-Habasha, the history of the conquests of Imam Ahmad ibn Ibrahim al-Ghazi. Seraye was profoundly affected by the Imam's conquests, according to Arab Faqih the province was captured in 1535, but the occupation was resisted bitterly by a nobleman named Tasfa Le’ul, who killed the Adalite governor Vizer Addole and sent his head to the Emperor. Imam Ahmed upon hearing the news marched at the head of an army to meet up with Wazir Abbas, however Tafsā Le’ul heard this news and encountered Abbas before he could meet up with the Imam. Supported by men from Dembiya, Tafsā Le’ul confronted the advancing Muslim force, but was defeated and fled whereupon the Muslims pursued them relentlessly, according to Arab Faqih not a single one managed to escape. After this victory, Imam Ahmed appointed Wazir Abbas as the Bahr Negash, but his forces eventually had to withdraw from the province due to a devastating plague and famine.

During the Italian colonial period, the fertile region attracted large numbers of European settlers, establishing a plantation at Kudo-Felasi and military garrisons at Adi Quala and Adi Ugri.
