= Ghébrē-Michael =

Ethiopian Roman Catholic priest (1791–1855)

Blessed Ghébrē-Michael CM
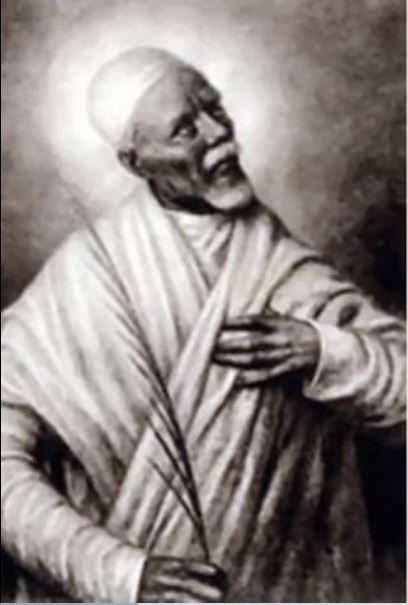

Martyr
- Born: 1791; Dibo, West Gojam, Ethiopia
- Died: 30 July 1855 (aged 64) between Meccia Coreccia and Molicha Gebaba, Mirab Shewa, Ethiopia
- Venerated in: Roman Catholic Church, Ethiopian Catholic Church
- Beatified: 3 October 1926, Saint Peter's Basilica by Pope Pius XI
- Feast: 14 July, 30 August (Vincentians)

Ghébrē-Michael, CM (1791 - 30 July 1855) was a priest of the Ethiopian Catholic Church and postulant of the Congregation of the Mission.

Born in 1791, he became a monk in the Ethiopian Orthodox Church in 1813 and later met Giustino de Jacobis on a pilgrimage. Jacobis would later receive Ghébrē-Michael into the Catholic Church and ordained him as a priest. After the Coptic Orthodox Patriarch of Alexandria appointed a new Miaphysite bishop for the whole Ethiopian Orthodox Church, the new prelate set out to eliminate both Ghébrē-Michael and de Jacobis. After the accession of Tewodros II as Emperor of Ethiopia in 1855, Ghébrē-Michael was imprisoned, tortured for refusing to renounce Catholicism or the teachings of the Council of Chalcedon and later died due to ill treatment.

Ghébrē-Michael was beatified by Pope Pius XI in 1926.

== Life ==
Ghébrē-Michael was born in Ethiopia in Dibo in 1791. He was part of one of the three Ethiopian religious sects called the Kevats. He was educated in Dibo then aged twelve began his high school studies in one of the monastic schools where he was known for his shrewd manner of learning.

In his childhood he lost one eye in an accident that in his culture would have rendered him unfit for most forms of work. He received an education and then began his studies in one of the monasteries where he became a gifted student. He became professed as a monk in 1813. He had not prepared for ordination in the Coptic Orthodox Church and since monks did not become priests but he became fascinated instead with declining standards in monasteries and set out to find out what the causes were. His superiors helped facilitate his research and he was also allowed to travel across the nation visiting these monasteries and doing further research in their libraries. He also decided that these matters required further research and so decided to go to Jerusalem for additional studies.

In order to do this he joined a small delegation of Orthodox faithful who attempted to go to Alexandria - and then Cairo - to ask the Coptic Patriarch to appoint a new Orthodox bishop since the sole position had been rendered vacant. He also learnt that Bishop Giustino de Jacobis, the Catholic Apostolic Vicar of Abyssinia, would become part of the delegation due to high esteem for the region. De Jacobis had been reluctant to accept but compromised that he would go with the delegation if it headed to Rome on the sojourn back to Ethiopia. The delegation was not all too pleased with the Coptic prelate who was appointed, since he had received part of his education from Protestants; this bishop would go on to cause trouble for Catholicism in Ethiopia and had a particular disliking for Ghébrē-Michael and de Jacobis. The delegation headed to Rome to meet Pope Gregory XVI, a visit that the rector of the Irish College in Rome, Paul Cullen (later a cardinal), detailed in a 19 August 1841 letter to the Archbishop of Dublin, Daniel Murray.

Ghébrē-Michael first met de Jacobis during that pilgrimage in September 1843 and the bishop advised him to return home via a different route since de Jacobis believed that his research would cause him to make enemies. The delegation returned to the Red Sea port of Massawa and Ghébrē-Michael himself returned sometime later on his own as de Jacobis advised. The two would meet on a regular basis for the next six months and the two together visited monasteries before de Jacobis himself received him into the Catholic Church in February 1844; this led to six other Coptic monks asking for reception as well, after having seen his example.

In 1850 he and de Jacobis were in conversation when the latter asked him if he desired becoming a priest. De Jacobis later ordained him to the priesthood on 1 January 1851. The new Orthodox bishop in Ethiopia, meanwhile, instigated persecution of Catholicism and at one stage—when Ghébrē-Michael was set to enter the Congregation of the Mission as a postulant—he had him and de Jacobis arrested with four others. De Jacobis was kept hidden from the others while their captors hoped extreme isolation and torture would cause them to abandon Catholicism. De Jacobis was later released and in late 1854 the Orthodox bishop failed through torture to get him and the others to apostatize. Tewodros II was crowned as the king in 1855 and also sought to torture Ghébrē-Michael to get him to apostatize to no avail. To that end, the emperor kept him in chains and would have him brought with him whenever and wherever he travelled.

In May 1855 the British Consul visited the emperor and the latter decided to put Ghébrē-Michael on trial in the consul's presence. He refused to abandon his faith and the court deemed that he should be shot dead. But the consul asked for him to be spared and the emperor agreed, which left the priest back in chains and moved from place to place as the emperor traveled.

He later died due to ill treatment on a road under a cedar tree. His remains were never found. De Jacobis later explained in a letter to the Congregation's superior general Jean-Baptiste Etienne that Ghébrē-Michael could be considered a member in the order despite his having been a postulant; in his words, "he belonged in his heart and in his spirit to the congregation".

== Beatification ==
The informative phase in investigation into potential beatification opened and closed in Addis Ababa in 1904 as did a similar process in Asmara in 1909; the formal introduction to the cause came under Pope Benedict XV on 25 January 1920 and he became titled as a Servant of God. The apostolic process was held from 1921 to 1922 after which point the Congregation for Rites validated the previous processes on 11 December 1923. On 22 May 1926 Ghébrē-Michaels beatification received formal approval from Pope Pius XI who beatified him on 3 October.
