= Akele Guzai =

Historical province in Eritrea

Akele Guzay (Tigrinya: ኣከለ ጉዛይ) was a province in the interior of Eritrea until 1996, when the newly independent national government consolidated all provinces into the Northern Red Sea and Debub (Southern) regions.

The province was bordered on the west by Seraye, Hamasien to the northwest, Tigray to the south and the Afar lowlands to the east.

== History ==
Akkele Guzay is home to an inscriptional record going back to at least the 9th century BC, the earliest use of the Geʽez script.

Akkele Guzay's name has been connected by some to the Gaze of the Monumentum Adulitanum (which later medieval Greek notes in the margins associate with the Aksumite people). If the note regarding the Gaze is accurate, it would connect the name of Akkele Guzay to the Ag`azyan or Agazi (i.e. Geʽez speakers). This connection has been rejected by linguists in modern times, however, due to the lack of the middle voiced pharyngeal fricative in the triliteral root, which is usually preserved in Tigrinya (the main language in Akkele Guzay).

The name may be connected with the Agwezat clan conquered by the 4th century King Ezana of Axum, and the Agaze (unvocalized 'GZ, referring either to a person or a group) of the Hawulti at Matara. Along with Agame in Tigray, it was a main center of Aksumite culture, with a distinct sub-culture that separated the two regions from that of Central Tigray (Shire, Axum, Yeha), Southern Eritrea (Seraye, Hamasien, and Adulis), and frontier areas in northern Eritrea and Lasta.

After the decline of the Kingdom of Aksum, the districts of Akele Guzay were under the control of the Christian Zagwe Dynasty, confirmation of this can be seen in a land grant by King Lalibela in the monastery of Debre Libanos near Senafe. During medieval times, most of Akele Guzay was a part of the larger province of Bur, which also included Agame in Tigray, some northeastern Afar lowlands, and the Buri Peninsula; Akkele Guzay and Agame were part of "Upper" (La'ilay) Bur, while the lowlands were further distinguished as "Lower" (Tahtay).

Akele Guzay became an administrative unit in the mid-19th century after the decline of the Bur province. Ruled by various Tigrayan lords such as Mikael Sehul, Wolde Selassie and Sabagadis Woldu, Akele Guzay would regain its independence in the 1880s. Catholicism spread in the province through Wube Haile Maryam's alliance with French missionary Giustino de Jacobis, leading to widespread conversions in villages like Segeneiti and Digsa. In the late 19th century, local Catholics resisted Ethiopian taxation, briefly aligning with the Khedivate of Egypt. After Ethiopia's victory at the Battle of Gura, Rayya Oromo soldiers settled in the region and intermarried with the local women.

Conflicts with Tigray's Mengesha Yohannes led to the local elite collaborating with the Italians, though leaders like Bahta Hagos would later rebel. Under Italian rule (1898–1941), Akele Guzay expanded to Zula Bay, with its capital at Adi Keyh. After the end of Italian rule, the province was divided into four sub-provinces: Segeneiti, Dekemhare, Addi Keyh, and Senafe. In 1995, Akele Guzay lost its provincial status and became part of Eritrea's Debub zone.
