= Enda Mariam Cathedral, Asmara =

Main cathedral of Eritrea

Enda Mariam Cathedral
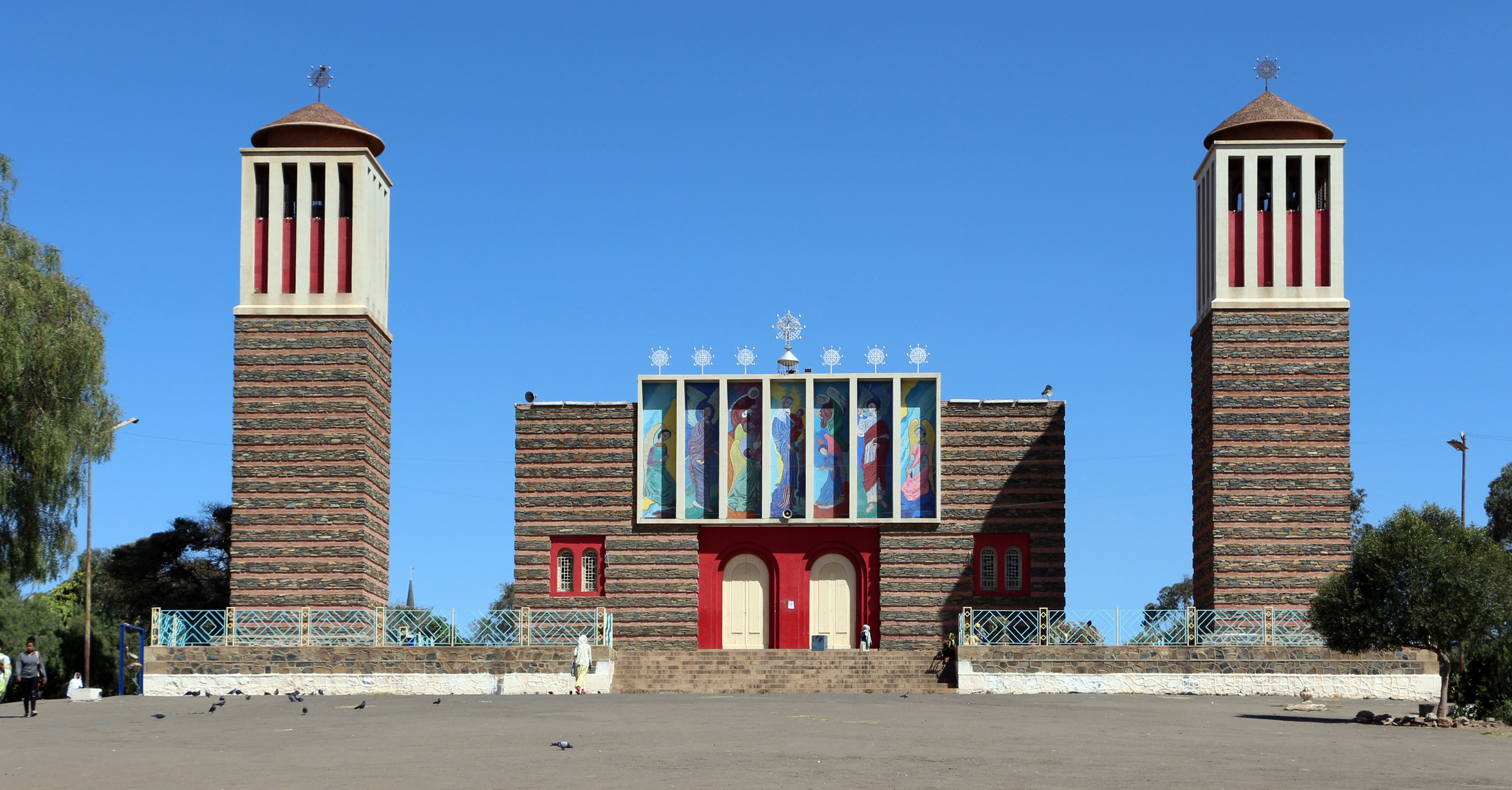

Religion
- Affiliation: Eritrean Orthodox Tewahedo Church
- Rite: Alexandrian
- Ecclesiastical or organisational status: Cathedral
- Status: Active

Location
- Location: Asmara, Eritrea
- Interactive map of Enda Mariam Cathedral
- Coordinates: 15.3398°N 38.9442°E

Architecture
- Type: Church
- Groundbreaking: 1938

Enda Mariam Cathedral (Tigrinya: ቅድስቲ ማርያም ጽዮን ቤተ ክርስትያን) is an Eritrean Orthodox church in Asmara, Eritrea. The cathedral is located on Arbate Asmara Street.

== Name ==
In the Tigrinya language enda (እንዳ) means "the place of, the habitat of (an object, a person, etc)". Thus, when combined with another noun, indicates a structure associated with that other thing. Thus enda bani (bread) means a bakery, enda afras (horses) means a stable, enda dewel (bell) means a church tower or belfry, enda tseba (milk) means a dairy. Mariam (ማርያም) means Mary. The church is also called Qidisti Mariam (Saint Mary).

== Description ==
The church (in a simple wooden structure) was present in Asmara since the late 19th century. In the early 1930s, the Italian governor of Asmara ordered to create an improved structure with modern building materials and under the supervision of Italian architects.

In its present rationalist/modernist style, the church dates from 1938, when an unknown Italian architect, added the upper portions of the two flanking towers and the modernistic treatment of the façade to the 1920 form designed by Ernesto Gallo. The 1920 form has also been attributed to Odoardo Cavagnari, who designed Asmara Theatre and Asmara's futuristic Fiat Tagliero service station, and who was Asmara's Chief of Public Works.

Both the central block and the two large freestanding square towers that flank it are built in alternate layers of brick and stone, emulating the layers of wood and stone of Aksumite architecture, a technique that has been for centuries in use in the Eritrean Highlands. The protruding wooden support beams in these structures have been named "monkey heads".

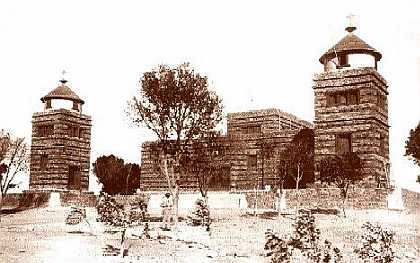
The church just before the 1930s additions

== Earlier forms ==
In his account of the visit to Eritrea in 1891 by a Royal Commission sent by the Italian government, Ferdinando Martini, in line with his derogatory attitude towards all matters concerning the native "Abyssinians", described the then church at Asmara as less decent than the huts for hay in Italian farmyards. The illustrated fourth (1896) edition of his book includes a photograph of the church, some seven metres long, with traditional "monkey head" walls and a thatched roof whose projection beyond the walls was supported by rough poles.

A 1922 photograph of the church and its two towers in their 1920 form shows that it then had no trace of more contemporary, European styles.

== Other prominent religious buildings ==
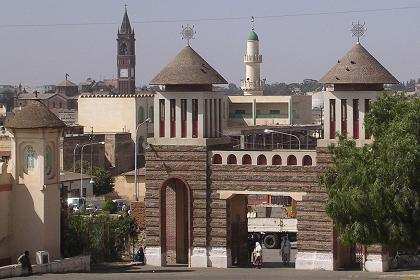
Enda Mariam compound with, in the background, the bell tower of the Church of Our Lady of the Rosary and the minaret of Kulafah Al Rashidan Great Mosque

It is one of three prominent religious landmarks in the city, the others being the Church of Our Lady of the Rosary and Kulafah Al Rashidan Great Mosque.

== Annual feast ==
The church's Nigdet (religious feast) of Saint Mary is celebrated on 30 November (1 December if the following Gregorian calendar year is a leap year).

== 1909 gallery of the original (6th century) Axumite church ==
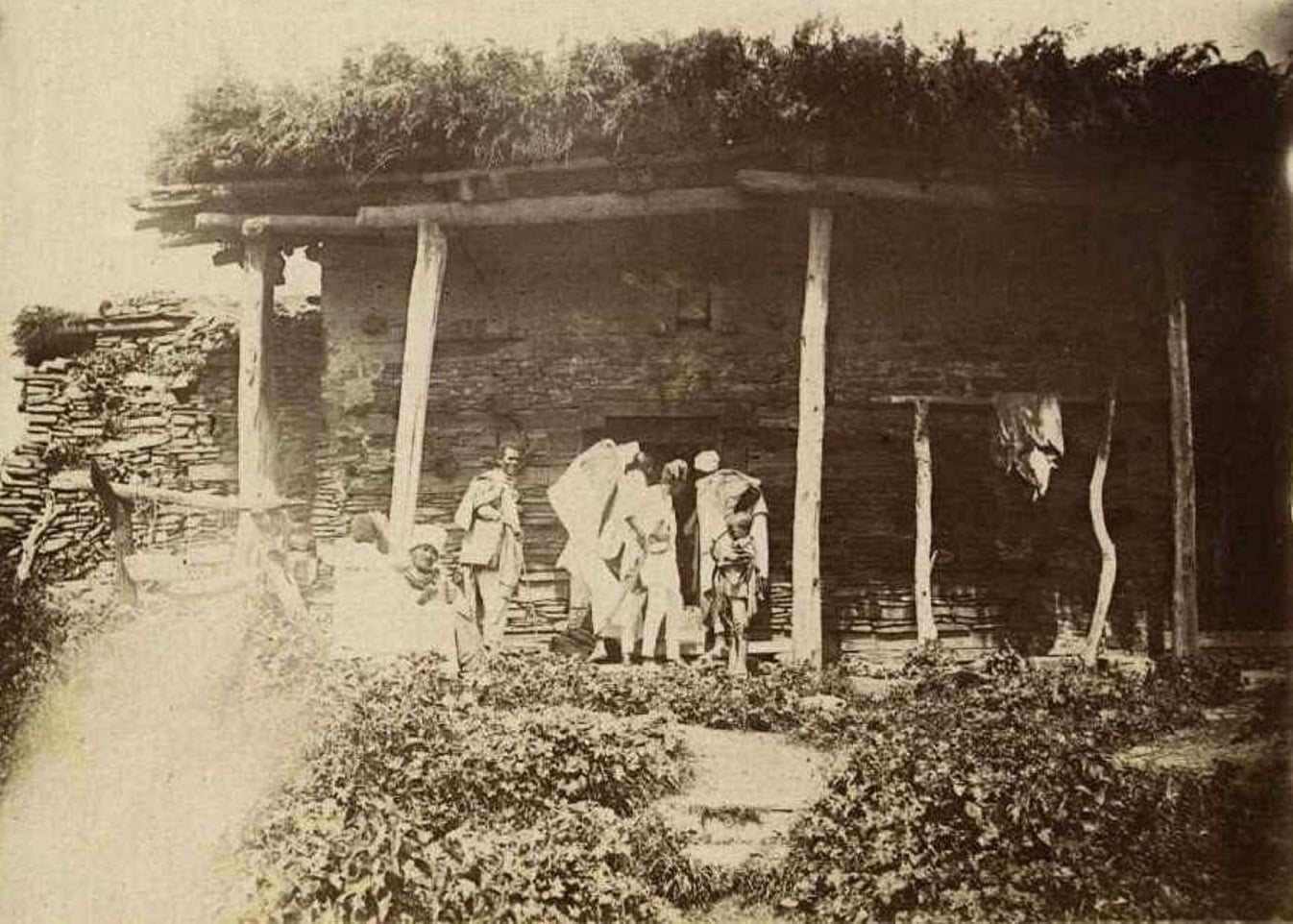
Coptic Orthodox priests and faithful facing the church

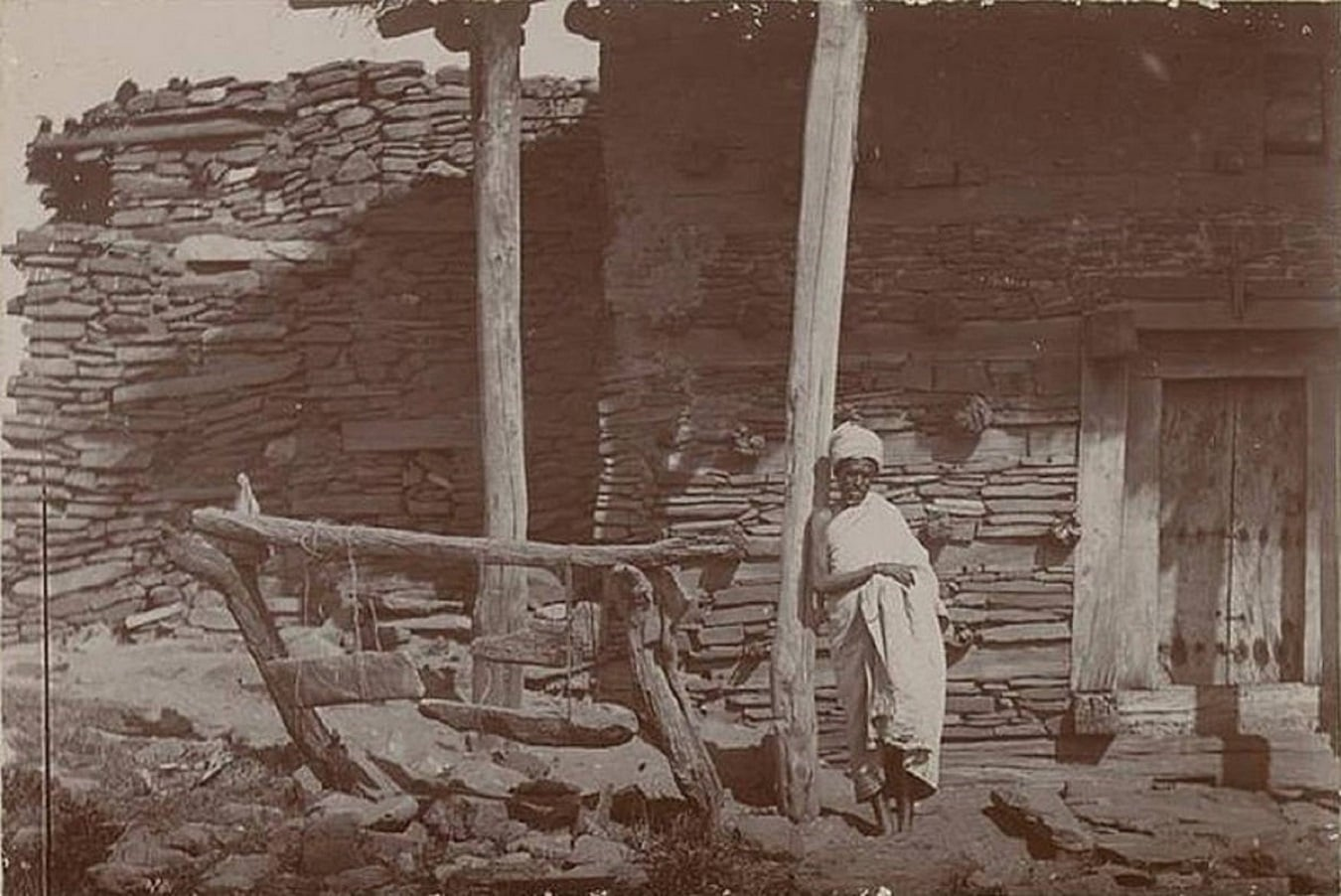
Depiction of the typical details of the Axumite buildings, basaltic stone bells still in use in many Eritrean churches

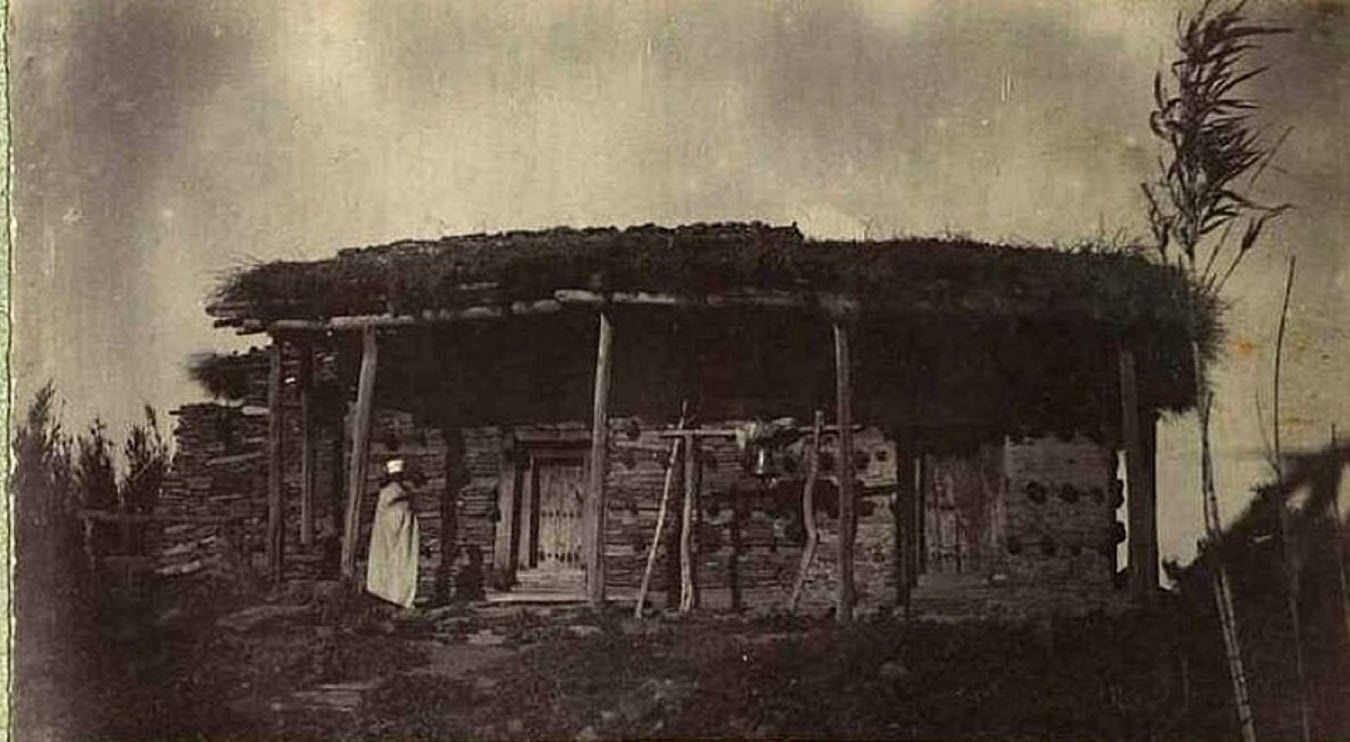

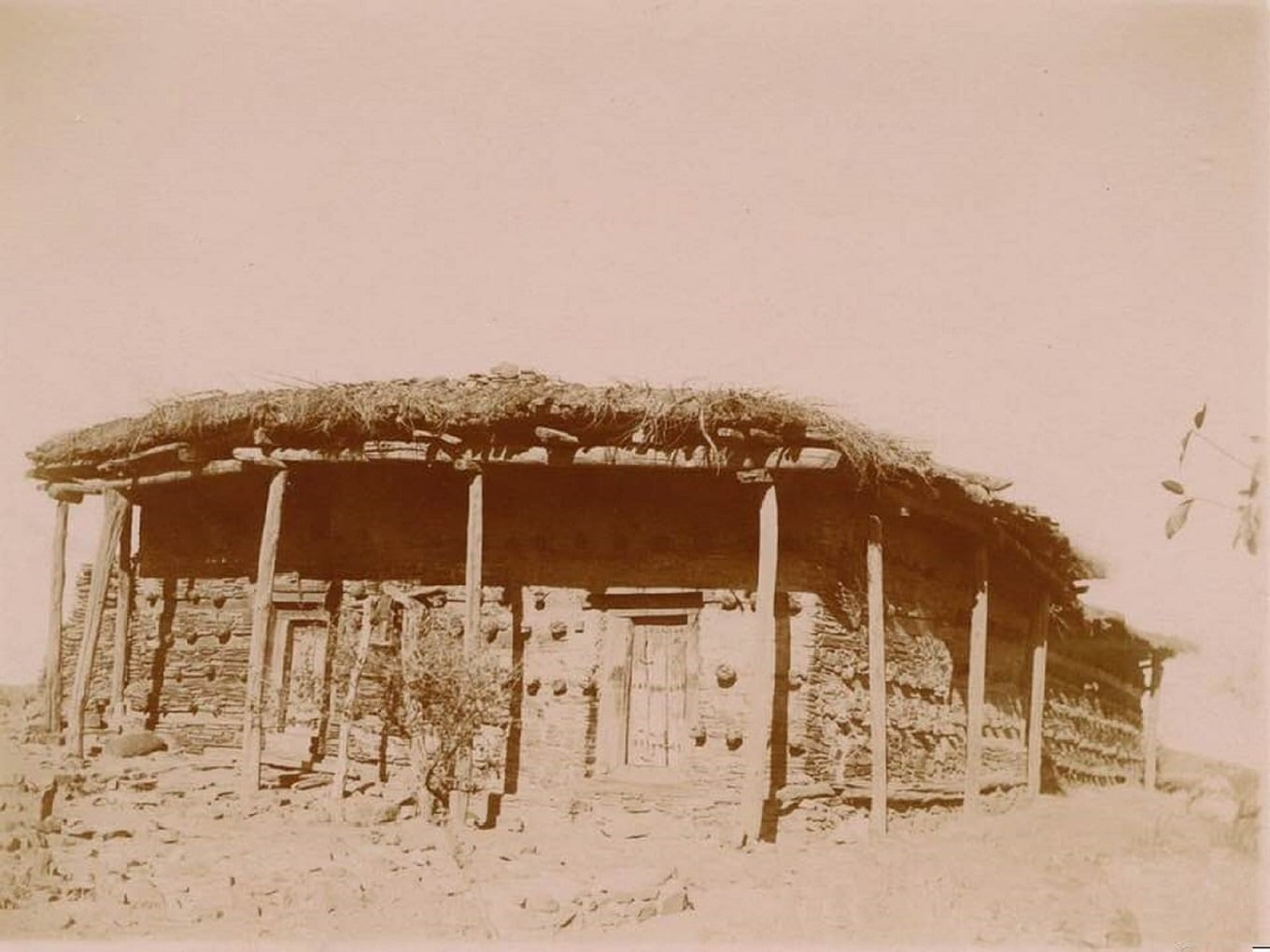

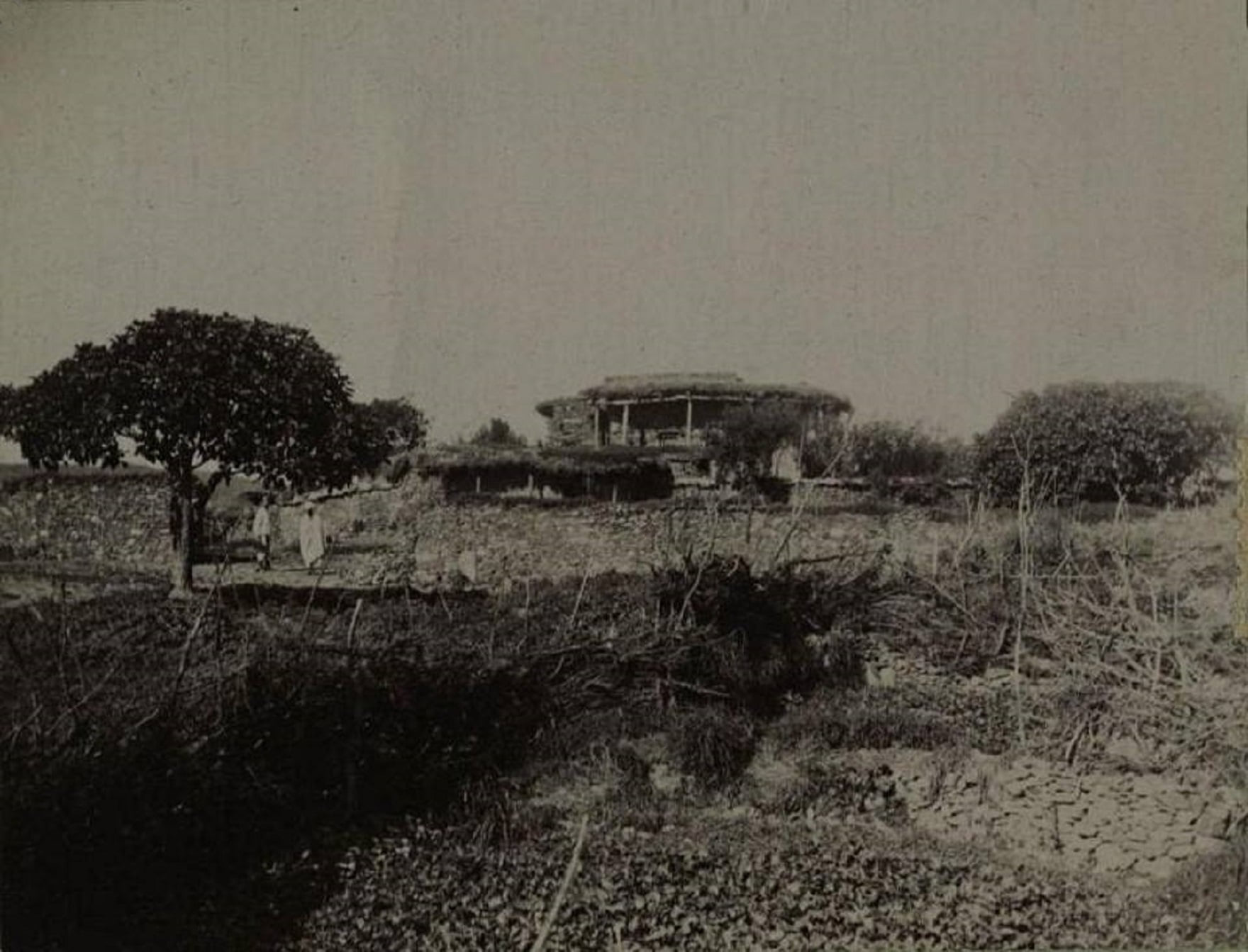
