= Battle of Halai =

1894 battle of the First Italo-Ethiopian War

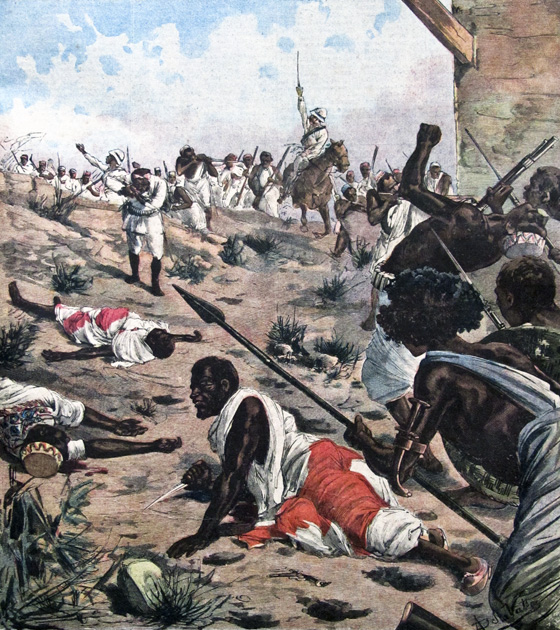
- Contemporary heroization in an Italian magazine
Date	15–18 December 1894
Location	Halai, Italian Eritrea
Result	Italian victory

Belligerents
Italy	Eritrean rebels

Commanders and leaders
Pietro Toselli	Bahta Hagos †

Strength
1,500 men 2 guns (under Pietro Toselli); 220 men (the fort in Halai)	1,600

Casualties and losses
11 killed 22 wounded	Unknown

The Battle of Halai, or the Battle of Halay, which took place in December 1894 was a battle between an Eritrean rebel force under Bahta Hagos and the Italian army.

In the 1890s, Ethiopia began plotting an insurrection in Italian-held Eritrea to push back against Italian encroachment on the country and to liberate the people from Italian imperialism.

== Battle ==
On 15 December 1894, Bahta Hagos, the "chief of Akkele Guzay province in southern Eritrea," launched a rebellion against the Italian authorities.

On 18 December a force of Italian troops, led by Major Pietro Toselli, discovered that the small Italian fort at Halai (garrisoned by 220 men) was being besieged by roughly 220, of Bahta's, rebels. Toselli attacked with 1,500 men, hitting the surprised rebels in their undefended rear.

The surprise attack was just at the right time since the rebels had almost taken the fort.

At first, Bahta Hagos tried to negotiate with the Italians, however the negotiations lasted only up to 4:00pm, when another 1,000 Italian reinforcements arrived. Bahta was killed in the ensuing fight and his army quickly fell apart soon after.

== Aftermath ==
In total, eleven Italians were killed and twenty-two were wounded in the action.
