= Debre Mariam =

Monastery in Eritrea

Debre Mariam is a monastery in Qohayn Eritrea, founded by Abba Absadi, a disciple of the monk Ewostatewos between 1340-1350. The monastery is located at the confluence of the Obel and Gash Rivers. Since its founding the monastery acquired an extravagant manuscript library. Debre Mariam was the preeminent monastery in Eritrea until Debre Bizen surpassed it.

== See also ==
- List of Eritrean Orthodox monasteries
