= Debre Libanos (Eritrea) =

Monastery in Eritrea

Debre Libanos Monastery
- Location: Senafe, Eritrea
- Country: Eritrea
- Denomination: Eritrean Orthodox Tewahedo Church

History
- Founded: 5th century
- Founder: Abune Libanos

Debre Libanos of Ham (or Däbrä Libanos of Šəmäzana, or Debre Libanos of Eritrea; Tigrinya: ደብረ ሊባኖስ ካልኣይ ቁዱስ ቦታ ብድሕሪ ደብረ ሲና) is the second-oldest monastery in Eritrea after Debre Sina. It is part of the Eritrean Orthodox Tewahedo Church. It is a strict monastery, where the monks are expected to plow the fields. This monastery should not be confused with the Debre Libanos monastery of Ethiopia.

== Location ==
It is located about 150 km southeast from Asmara, in the historical district of bet metäé ቤት መጣዕ in the present-day Debub region, in a part formerly known as the province of Akkälä Guzay, close to the border with and near the village of Ham (or Aham). Ham is the oldest settlement in the region. The monastery is also sometimes called Däbrä Wärq. Originally located in the village of Ham, the monastery was later moved to its present location perched on the edge of a cliff below the Ham plateau.

== Founder and Age ==
This very ancient monastery is said to have been founded by the missionary Abbunä Libanos (or Mäṭṭaˁ or Meta or Matewos or Yəsrin) in the late fifth or early sixth century, within a hundred years of the conversion of the Horn of Africa Aksum Empire to Christianity. This founder is "one of the most important saints of the Aksumite period and renowned as one of the early founders of the monasticism and asceticism in Ethiopia." He is now a saint in the Ethiopian Orthodox Church and the Eritrean Orthodox Church. This monastery includes a very rare copy of his hagiography, Gädlä Libanos. While many monasteries in the Horn of Africa claim to be ancient, this is one of the few which has actually been established to be ancient. The record of a land grant (or gʷəlt) from Emperor Lalibela, regnal name Gabra Masqal (r. 1181 to 1221), giving land for the monastery, has survived. It is the very earliest extant land grant documents in the Horn of Africa.

== Library ==
The Monastery of Däbrä Libanos has an important archive, with about 84 manuscripts. It contains one of the earliest manuscripts in the Horn of Africa: "The Golden Gospel" (or Wängelä Wärq). It is a metal-covered book of the Four Gospels of the Christian Bible, dating to the thirteenth century as evidenced by marginalia land charters that date back to then.

== Mentions ==
A story in Täˀammərä Maryam (Miracles of Mary) says that miraculous water dripped from the ceiling of this monastery's churches.

== Abbots ==
Its earliest known abbots are:

- Täsfa Ḥəywät or Zena Yoḥannəs, c. 1209
- Yərdəˀannä Krəstos or Ṣägga Mäṭaˁ, already in 1225 and up to 1268
- Täkäśtä Bərhan or Śännay Mänfäs, in 1270
- Asfəḥa or Efrem, 1200s to 1319
- Ǝqbä Ǝgziˀ or Krəstos Abuhu; Gäbrä Krəstos or Yərdəˀannä Ǝgziˀ, from 1322 to Säyfä Arˁad's reign

== Burial ==
It also holds around 60 mummified bodies which are still in the process of being dated. The mummified bodies are wrapped in cloth, then tightly wrapped with animal skins of the same yellow cloth and animal skin that are worn by monks today. The few specimens of complete mummified remains have only the feet and hands exposed; the rest of the body was completely wrapped in skin. On the hands and feet, the skin and nail were very well preserved. The origin of mummification in Eritrea is likely Egypt, as Abba Libanos (whose body is believed among the mummies at the place) travelled through from Egypt, where the practice is common. According to oral tradition, the mummified skeleton remains found in the monasteries of Eritrea are bodies of religious individuals that inhabited them. The reason for mummification and the exact time when the practice was introduced are not known. But according to the oral tradition, the practice might have been introduced by about between the fifth and eight centuries CE together with the monks who were coming to Eritrea from the Middle East via Alexandria to expand Christianity.

== See also ==
- List of Eritrean Orthodox monasteries
