= List of World Heritage Sites in Eritrea =

Location of the World Heritage Site in Eritrea

The United Nations Educational, Scientific and Cultural Organization (UNESCO) World Heritage Sites are places of importance to cultural or natural heritage as described in the UNESCO World Heritage Convention, established in 1972. Cultural heritage consists of monuments (such as architectural works, monumental sculptures, or inscriptions), groups of buildings, and sites (including archaeological sites). Natural features (consisting of physical and biological formations), geological and physiographical formations (including habitats of threatened species of animals and plants), and natural sites which are important from the point of view of science, conservation or natural beauty, are defined as natural heritage. Eritrea accepted the convention on October 24, 2001, making its historical sites eligible for inclusion on the list. As of 2023, Eritrea has only one World Heritage Sites.

== World Heritage Sites ==
UNESCO lists sites under ten criteria; each entry must meet at least one of the criteria. Criteria i through vi are cultural, and vii through x are natural.

World Heritage Sites
Site	Image	Location (region)	Year listed	UNESCO data	Description
Asmara: A Modernist African City		Central Region	2017	1550; ii, iv (cultural)	Located at over 2,000 m above sea level, the capital of Eritrea developed from the 1890s onwards as a military outpost for the Italian colonial power. After 1935, Asmara underwent a large scale programme of construction applying the Italian rationalist idiom of the time to governmental edifices, residential and commercial buildings, churches, mosques, synagogues, cinemas, hotels, etc. The property encompasses the area of the city that resulted from various phases of planning between 1893 and 1941, as well as the indigenous unplanned neighbourhoods of Arbate Asmera and Abbashawel. It is an exceptional example of early modernist urbanism at the beginning of the 20th century and its application in an African context.

== Tentative list ==
In addition to sites inscribed on the World Heritage List, member states can maintain a list of tentative sites that they may consider for nomination. Nominations for the World Heritage List are only accepted if the site was previously listed on the tentative list. Eritrea maintains one property on its tentative list.

Tentative sites
Site	Image	Location	Year listed	UNESCO criteria	Description
Qohaito Cultural Landscape		Debub Region	2011	iii, v (cultural)	
