= Absadi =

14th-century Eritrean Orthodox saint

Saint and Martyr
- Died: 1381; Eritrea
- Venerated in: Eritrean Orthodox Tewahedo Church
- Feast: September 28

Abba Absadi (died 1381) is a saint of the Ethiopian and Eritrean Orthodox Tewahedo Churches. He was a disciple of Ewostatewos, and his best-known disciple is Abba Filipos. He founded the monastery of Debre Mariam in 1374, which is located in modern-day Eritrea. He was captured by the soldiers and tortured on the wheel, then he was thrown on the stove. He endured all the tortures patiently and then was beheaded.

Absadi's feast day is September 28 (Meskerem 18 in the Ethiopian Ecclesiastical calendar).

== Sources ==
- Holweck, F. G. A Biographical Dictionary of the Saints. St. Louis, MO: B. Herder Book Co. 1924.
