= Ewostatewos =

Ethiopian religious leader during the early Solomonic period (1273–1352)

Saint Eustathius of Ethiopia
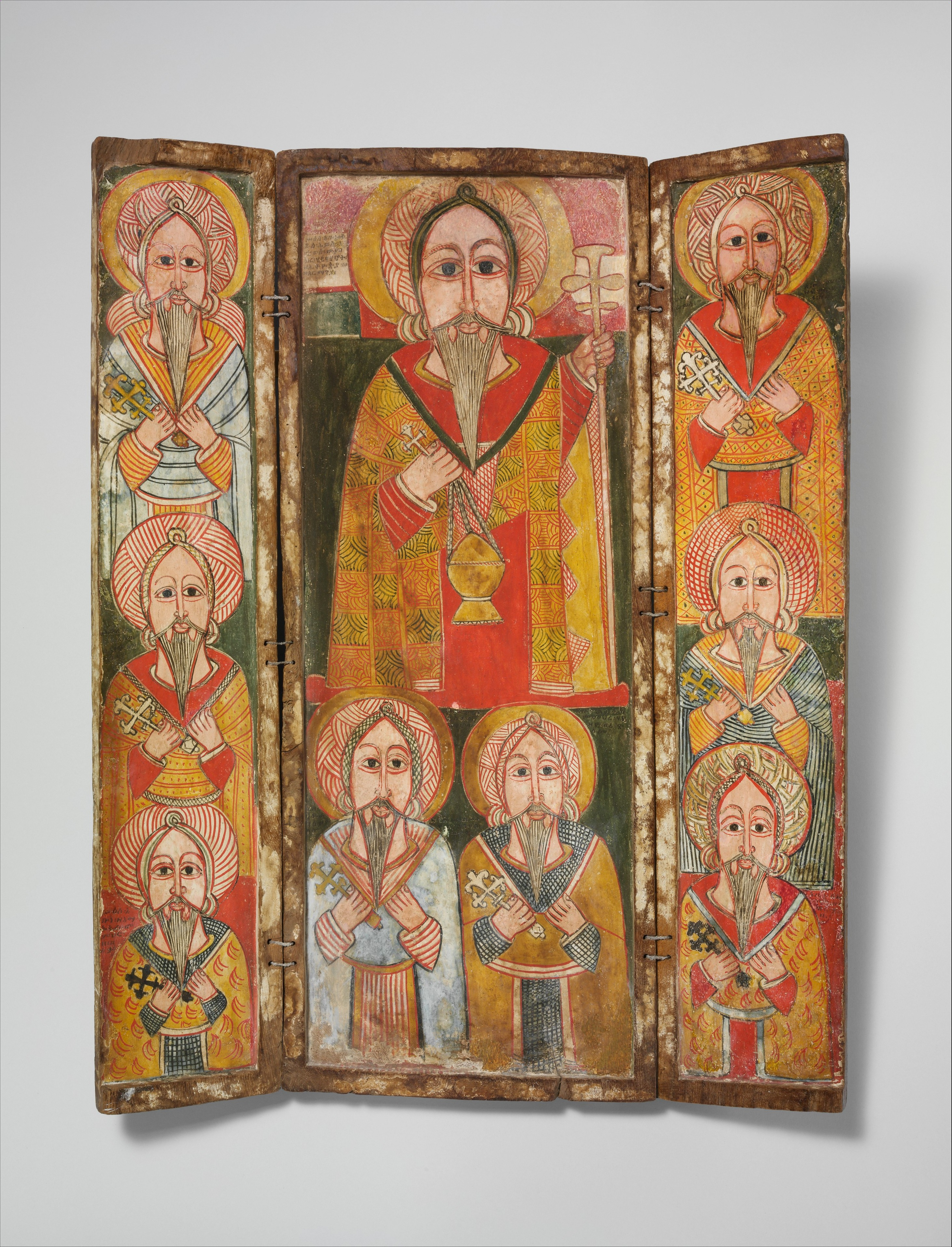
- Ewostatewos preaching to his disciples
- Born: 22 July 1273; Tsira, Enderta Province, Ethiopian Empire
- Died: 23 September 1352 (aged 79); Cilician Armenia
- Venerated in: Oriental Orthodoxy
- Patronage: House of Ewostatewos
- Controversy: Sabbath observance

Ewostatewos (Ge'ez: ኤዎስጣቴዎስ, ʾEwosṭātewos, or ዮስጣቴዎስ, Yosṭātewos, a version of Ancient Greek: Εὐστάθιος Eustathios; 22 July 1273 – 23 September 1352) was an Ethiopian religious leader of the Orthodox Tewahedo during the early period of the Solomonic dynasty of Ethiopian Empire. He was a forceful advocate for the observation of the Sabbath in Christianity. His followers, known as the House of Ewostatewos (individuals are known as Ewostathians), have been a historic force in Tewahedo Orthodoxy.

== Early life ==
Ewostatewos was born on 22 July 1273 (Gregorian calendar), or 15 July 1273 (Julian calendar), or 21 Hamle 1265 as Māʿqāba ʾƎgziʾ (ማዕቃበ እግዚእ) to Śǝna Ḥǝywat (ሥነ ሕይወት) and his father, Krǝstos Moʾa (ክርስቶስ ሞአ). According to the 16th-century hagiography of his pupil Ananya, Ewostatewos was born in the Tsiraʿ northeast of Mekelle, part of Enderta Province (now in Enderta woreda) near where he would later found the monastery of Debre Tserabi.

Around 1280, while still young, he was sent to live with his uncle, Abba Daniel (monastically known as Zekaryas), the abbot of the mountain abbey of Debre Maryam Qorqor in Gar'alta, a district of Enderta Province. Daniel provided him with his earliest education and introducing him to monastic life. Māʿqāba ʾƎgziʾ announced his intention to become a monk at 15 and with his decision was renamed to Ewostatewos.

== Career as a religious figure ==
After being ordained a monk by his uncle, Ewostatewos left the community and founded his own monastery in Serae, in what is now Eritrea. There he attracted a large number of students and explained his views until the arrival of Abuna Yaqob III (c. 1337), who was opposed to his views. Ewostatewos, accompanied by most of his disciples, including Bakamos Marqorewos and Gabra Iyasus. He first reached Sudan then Cairo, where he met Pope Benjamin II of Alexandria and defended his views before the church leader. He then visited Jerusalem and eventually traveled to Cilician Armenia, where he died on 23 September 1352 (Gregorian calendar), 15 September 1352 (Julian calendar), or 18 Meskerem 1345 in the Ethiopian calendar.

The Ewostatewos view of the Sabbath was that it should be observed on both Saturday (the Lesser Sabbath) and Sunday (the Christian Sabbath): Saturday for the original Sabbath of the Old Testament and Sunday in honor of the resurrection of Christ in the New Testament. He found support for his views in the Ten Commandments and the Canons of the Apostles. This has been the historical practice of the Tewahedo Churches. Taddesse Tamrat cites evidence that suggests that the interpretation of Ewostatewos regarding the Sabbath was not his own innovation, but had been practiced in the Coptic Orthodox Church of Alexandria before his time and only declared heretical in Egypt a few centuries before.

== Influence on the Orthodox Tewahedo ==
After his death, his students and disciples continued to advocate Ewostatewos' religious views. When Ewostatewos left Medri Bahri, he had entrusted his community to his senior disciple, Absadi, who had a difficult time keeping the community together until the other disciples returned to Medri Bahri after a 14-year absence. Together they helped him establish a community at Debre Mariam in Medri Bahri. His followers later spread across northern Ethiopia, founding new monasteries that not only promoted Ewostatewos' interpretation of the Sabbath but created a religious hierarchy that was independent of the Abuna. Their persistence eventually led to their success in 1450 at the Council of Debre Mitmaq in Tegulet, where Emperor Zara Yaqob was able to convince the Egyptian leadership to acquiesce to this observance.

James Bruce notes that the leader of this order, at the time of his visit to Ethiopia, was the abbot of Mahebar Selassie, in the northwestern corner of that country.
