= Debre Bizen =

Monastery in Eritrea

Coordinates: 15°20′N 39°5′E

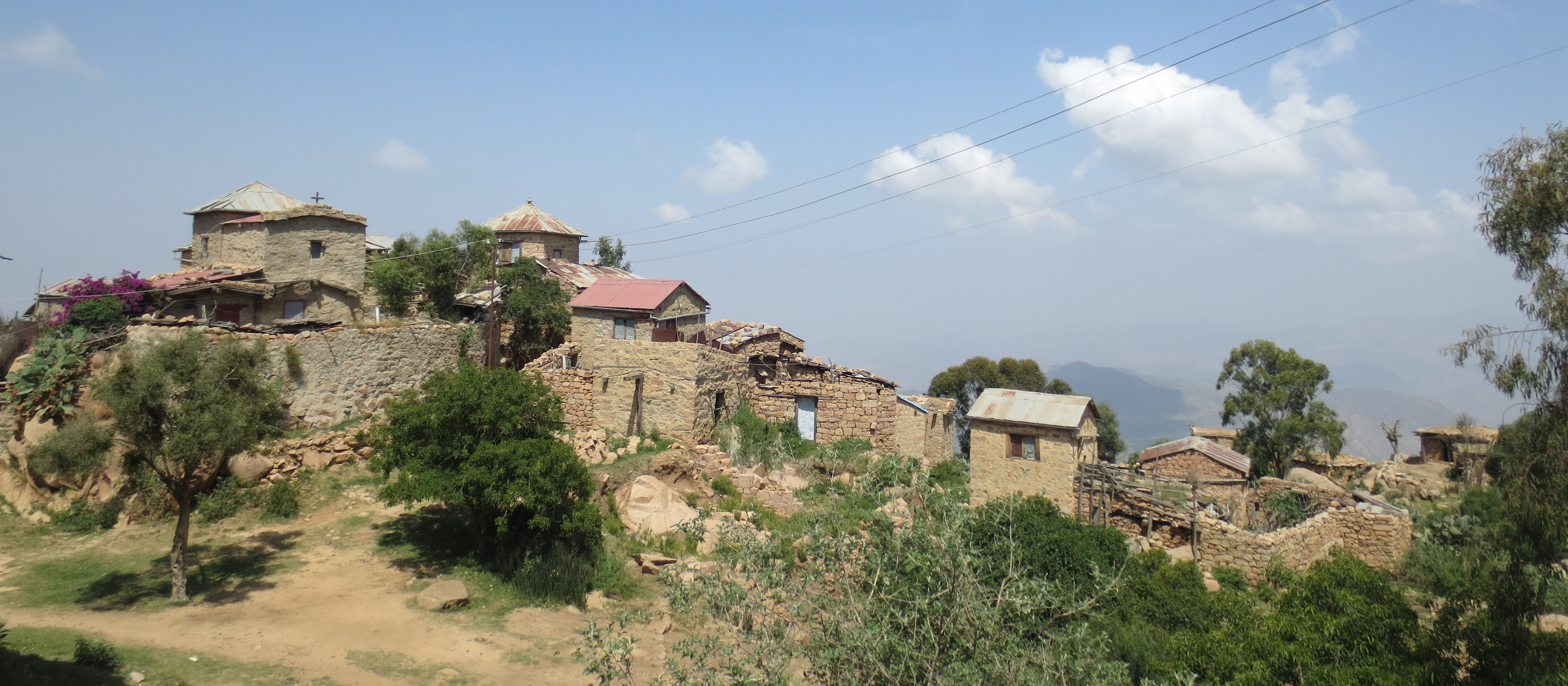
Some of the buildings of the monastery complex

Debre Bizen is an Eritrean Orthodox Tewahedo Church monastery. Located at the top of Debre Bizen the mountain (2460 meters) near the town of Nefasit in Eritrea. Its library contains many important Ge'ez manuscripts.

== History ==
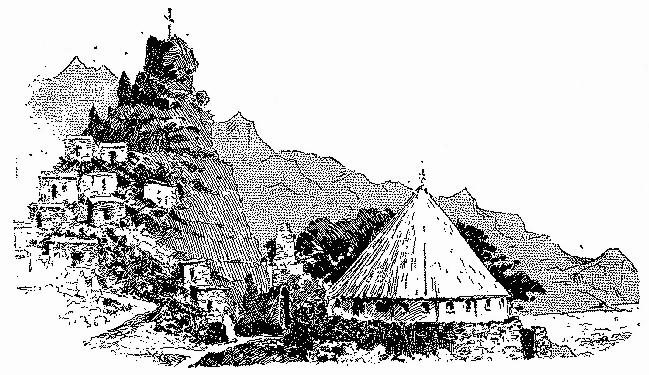
Engraving of Debre Bizen, originally published in J.T. Bent, The Sacred City of the Ethiopians (London, 1896)

Debre Bizen was founded in the 1350s by Filipos, who was a student of Absadi. By 1400, the Monastery followed the rule of the House of Ewostatewos (Ancient Greek: Εὐστάθιος Eustáthios), and a gadl (hagiography) of Ewostatewos was later composed there. According to Tom Killion, it remained independent of the Ethiopian Church, while Richard Pankhurst states that it continued to be dependent on the Ethiopian Orthodox Tewahedo Church centered in Axum. In either case, a charter survives of the Emperor Zara Yaqob in which he granted lands to Debre Bizen.

The monastery was one of several habitations damaged by the Ottoman Empire in their campaigns to establish their province of Habesh Eyalet in the 16th century.

When Abuna Yohannes XIV, who came from Cairo to Eritrea to serve as head of the Eritrean/ Ethiopian Church, was held for ransom at Arkiko by the local naib, the abbot of Debre Bizen helped him to escape.

== See also ==
- List of Eritrean Orthodox monasteries
