= Giustino de Jacobis =

Catholic saint & bishop (1800–1860)

Saint Giustino de Jacobis CM
- Apostolic Vicar of Abyssinia
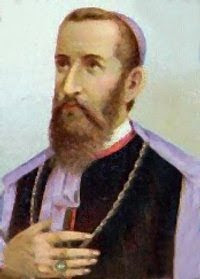
- Church: Catholic Church
- Appointed: 6 July 1847
- Term ended: 31 July 1860
- Predecessor: None; position established
- Successor: Lorenzo Biancheri
- Other post: Titular Bishop of Nilopolis (1847–1860)
- Previous post: Prefect Apostolic of Abyssinia (1839-1847)

Orders
- Ordination: 12 June 1824
- Consecration: 7 January 1849 by Guglielmo Massaia

Personal details
- Born: Giustino Sebastiano Pasquale de Jacobis; 9 October 1800 San Fele, Potenza, Kingdom of Naples
- Died: 31 July 1860 (aged 59) Zula, Semenawi Keih Bahri, Eritrea

Sainthood
- Feast day: 31 July
- Venerated in: Catholic Church
- Beatified: 25 June 1939; Saint Peter's Basilica, Vatican City by Pope Pius XII
- Canonized: 26 October 1975; Saint Peter's Square, Vatican City by Pope Paul VI
- Attributes: Bishop's attire
- Patronage: Missionaries

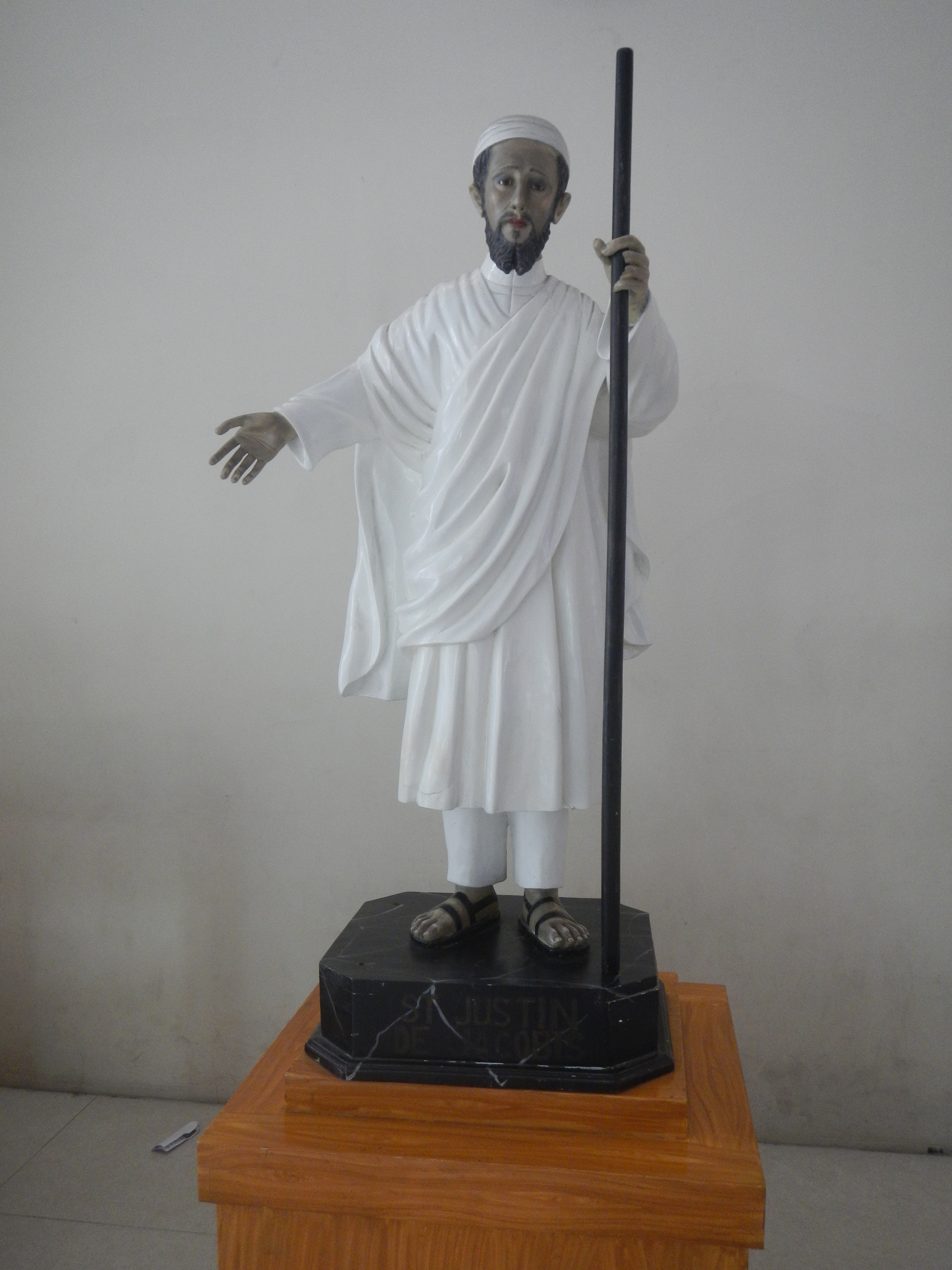
Statue of Saint Justin de Jacobis at the Santuario de San Vicente de Paul Parish.

Giustino Sebastiano Pasquale de Jacobis, CM (9 October 1800 – 31 July 1860) was an Italian Catholic bishop and member of the Congregation of the Mission who served as Apostolic Vicar of Abyssinia and the Titular Bishop of Nilopolis. He is often known in English-speaking countries as Justin de Jacobis.

== Life ==
Giustino Sebastiano Pasquale de Jacobis was born on 9 October 1800 at San Fele in the Province of Potenza. On 17 October 1818, he entered the Congregation of the Mission at Naples and made his religious vows there on 18 October 1820. He was ordained to the priesthood at Brindisi on 12 June 1824. After spending some time in the care of souls at Oria and Monopoli he became superior first at Lecce and then at Naples. He was among the priests who ministered during the cholera epidemic in Naples in 1836-1837.

In 1839, he was appointed as the first Prefect Apostolic of Ethiopia and entrusted with the foundation of Catholic missions there, a jurisdiction that included what is now Eritrea. He worked first in Adwa, celebrating the liturgy in the local language following the Alexandrian Rite. After laboring with great success in Ethiopia for almost a decade he was appointed as the Titular Bishop of Nilopolis in 1847 and not long afterwards the Vicar Apostolic. However he declined the episcopal honor until 1849 when he was prevailed upon to accept it and receive episcopal consecration in secret.

Jacobis built schools in Agame and Akele Guzay for the training of a native priesthood and in the process founding the beginnings of the Ethiopian Catholic Church and the Eritrean Catholic Church. His missionary efforts aroused opposition on the part of Ethiopian Orthodox Patriarch Abuna Salama III and Emperor Tewodros II which resulted in imprisonment and exile. Despite various other kinds of persecution, he founded numerous Catholic missions.

He died of fever in 1860 at Hebo of what is now the Southern Administrative Region of Eritrea, while en route to Halai, where he hoped to regain his health.

=== Gabra Mika'el ===
Jacobis befriended an Orthodox monk named Ghébrē-Michael. After some time Jacobis converted his friend to Catholicism and eventually ordained him to the priesthood. Together they co-wrote a catechism and established a seminary. Ghébrē-Michael was imprisoned at the same time as Jacobis, but Ghébrē-Michael not survive the maltreatment by his jailers. For his martyrdom, Ghébrē-Michael was beatified in 1926.

== Sainthood ==
The canonization process commenced in Ethiopia in 1891 in an informative process that finished in 1894. Theologians approved his writings in 1902 as being in line with the magisterium of the faith. The apostolic process then opened not long after in 1904 and concluded less than a decade later in 1913.

The formal commencement of the cause - in the pontificate of Pope Pius X - came on 13 July 1904 after having received the approval of the Congregation of Rites.

Jacobis was declared to be Venerable on 28 July 1935 after Pope Pius XI acknowledged the late bishop's life of heroic virtue. Pope Pius XII beatified him on 25 June 1939 while Pope Paul VI canonized him as a saint on 26 October 1975.

== See also ==
- Frumentius - early missionary to Aksum

== Sources ==
- Devin, A., (English trans by Lady Elizabeth Herbert of Lea), Abyssinia and its Apostle (biography) (1867) London: Burns and Oates.
- Edition of A. Devin biography
- Saint of the Day, July 31: Justin of Jacobis at SaintPatrickDC.org
