= Debre Sina (monastery) =

Monastery in Eritrea

- Location within Eritrea

Monastery information
- Established: 3rd-century
- Diocese: Eritrean Orthodox Tewahedo Church
- Controlled churches: St. Mary's Church

People
- Founders: Frumentius; Abune Yohani

Architecture
- Style: Aksumite

Site
- Location: Anseba Region
- Country: Eritrea
- Coordinates: 15.7487796°N 38.6996201°E
- Public access: Yes

Debra Sina (Tigrinya: ደብረ ሲና) is a monastery in the highlands of Eritrea near Keren in the Anseba Region. It was founded in the 4th century by saint Aba Salama, making it one of the oldest churches in the world.

== History ==
This was the site where the first sacrament of the Holy Communion was instituted in the Eritrean Orthodox Church, by the 3rd-century bishop Aba Salama. It is one of the oldest monasteries in Africa and the world, as it was built in 383.

Later, the Monastery of Debre Sina was founded in the 5th century by Abune Yohani, who arrived from Egypt with a number of monks during the reign of King Saladoba of Aksum. According to tradition, Abune Yohani received divine revelations that led him to establish the monastery. He initially named it Debre Sehat, drawing inspiration from the wilderness of Scetes (Shehat in Arabic), a monastic center in northern Egypt where Saint Macarius the Great pioneered monasticism.

A Bishop named Nahom consecrated the altar within the cave that served as the monastery's original structure. A holy liturgy is celebrated on June 21 (Ge'ez calendar) to commemorate this event. Abune Yohani is also credited with founding other monasteries, including Debre Aba Yohani, which existed until the 18th century but is now in ruins.

Later, during the reign of King Al-Ameda, the Nine Saints, who came from the Byzantine Empire, approached the monastery from Mount Agaro. Upon seeing a pillar of light resembling the one witnessed by Moses on Mount Sinai, they renamed the monastery Debre Sina ("Mount Sinai"). This name has persisted to the present day.

== Annual Feasts ==
- May 21 (Ge'ez calendar): Commemorates the revelation of Saint Mary and other saints to Abune Yohani during his prayers in his cell.
- June 21 (Ge'ez calendar): Celebrates the consecration of the Church of the Holy Theotokos, Saint Mary.

The monastery is the site of a pilgrimage by Eritrean Orthodox believers each year in June.

The pilgrimage centres on a church above the village where a vision of Mary was said to have been seen by shepherd girls beneath a large boulder. The church is built adjacent to and over the rock where the vision was seen. The pilgrimage includes thousands of ordinary Eritrean believers camping for one night in the village of Debra Sina, singing, drumming, chanting and celebrating Mary.

== The Church ==
Initially, the monastery's church consisted of a large rock formation containing a cell, believed to have been miraculously placed. The kine mahlet (Ge'ez: ቅኔ ማኅሌት), the section of the church where psalms and prayers are chanted, was constructed in 1951.

== Monasticism ==
The monastic tradition established by Abune Yohani continued for many generations until the monastery was looted by Ahmed ibn Ibrahim al-Ghazi in 1527 AD. Later, five monks from Debre Bizen Monastery revitalized Debre Sina. The monastic lifestyle adheres to the canons of Saint Pachomius, as implemented by Abune Yohani.

== Churches Consecrated by Debre Sina ==
Debre Sina played a significant role in establishing other churches in the region, including:

- The Church of Saint Michael, with its estates and gardens in Bahri Mirara.
- The Church of Kidane Mihret in Nakfa.
- The Church of saint Tekle Haymanot in Afabet.
- The Church of the Savior of the World and the Church of Abuna Aregawi in Elabered.
- The Church of Saint Mary Qusquam in Geleb, near Agaro.

These churches are now administered by their respective zonal bishoprics.

The monastery was completely rebuilt during Italian colonial years (in the 1930s)

== See also ==
- List of Eritrean Orthodox monasteries

== Bibliography ==
- Killion, Tom (1998). Historical Dictionary of Eritrea. The Scarecrow Press. ISBN 0-8108-3437-5.
