= List of cities in Eritrea =

This is a list of cities and towns in Eritrea by population. It includes all settlements with a population of over 5,000.

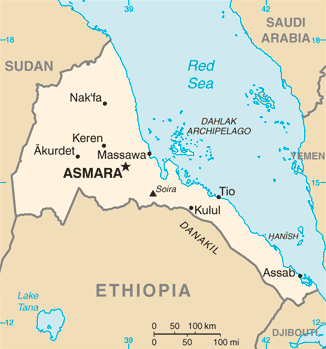
Map of Eritrea

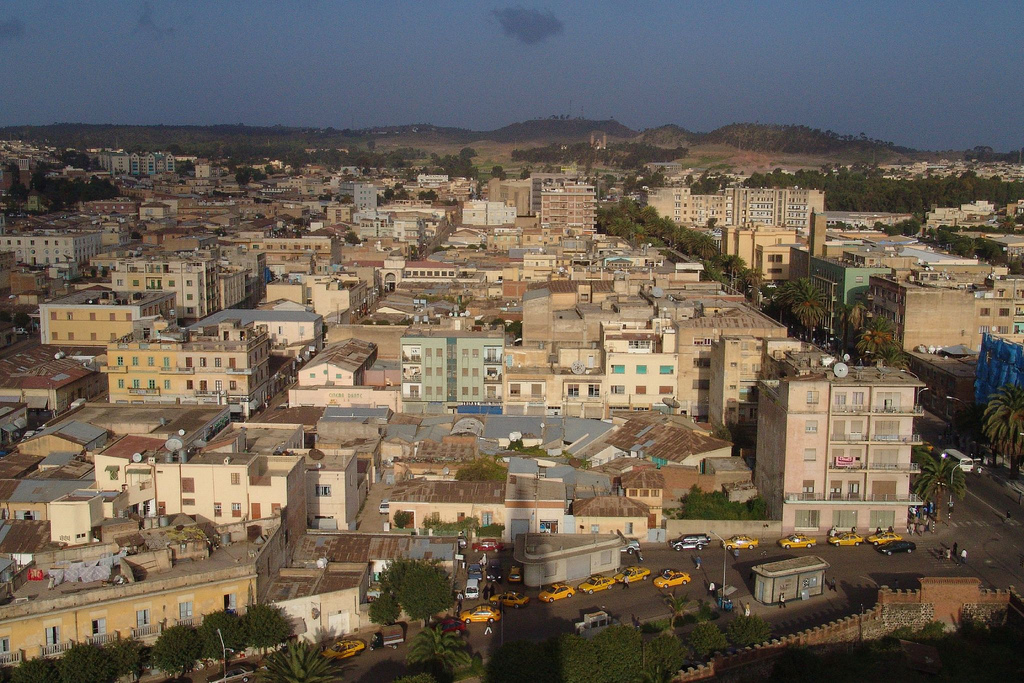
Asmara, Capital of Eritrea

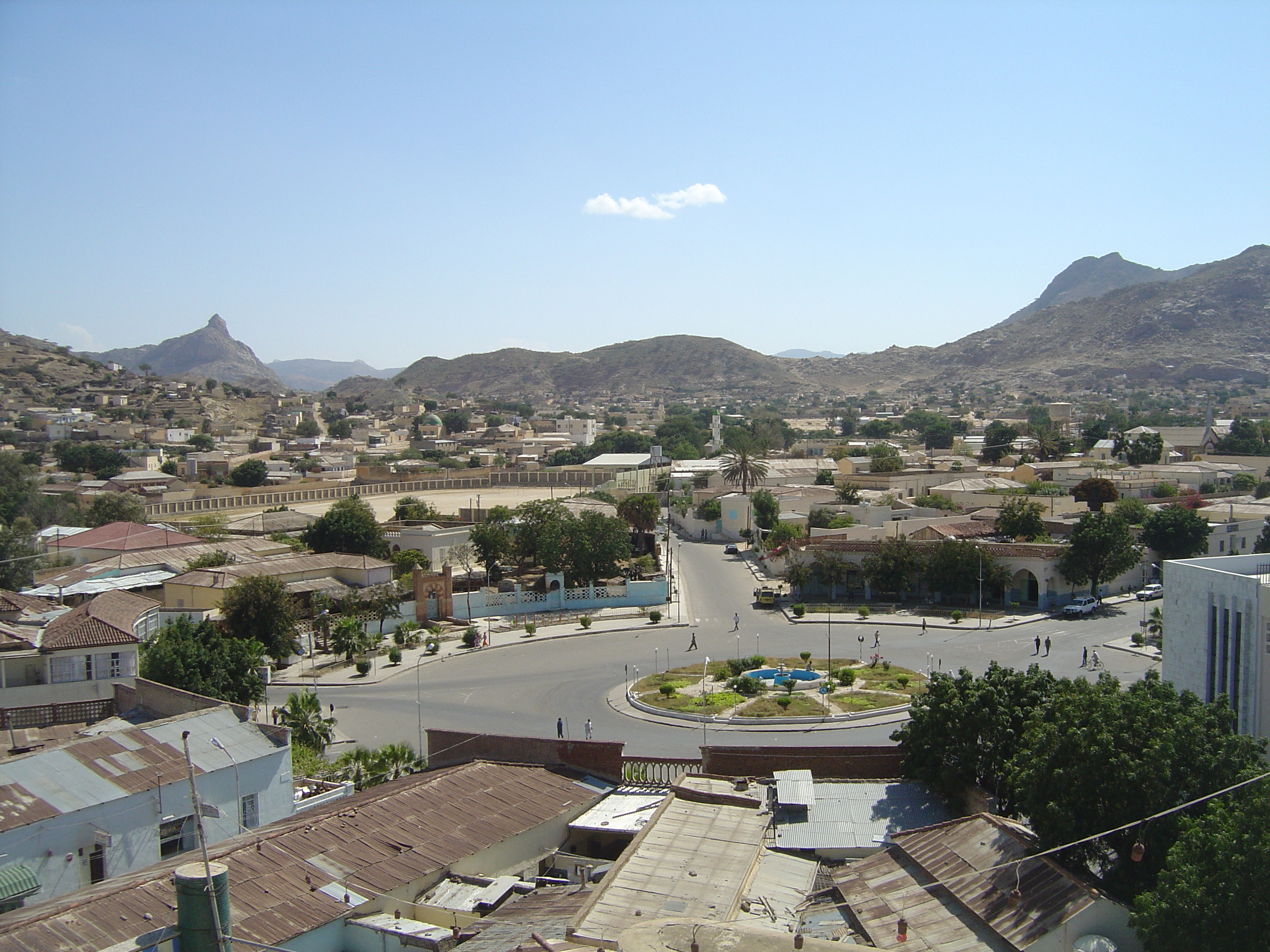
Keren

Cities in Eritrea
Rank	City	Population		Region
Rank	City	1984 Census	2010 estimate	Region
1	Asmara	475,385	649,707	Maekel
2	Keren	126,149	146,483	Anseba
3	Teseney	52,531	64,889	Gash-Barka
4	Mendefera	22,184	63,492	Debub
5	Agordat	15,948	47,482	Gash-Barka
6	Assab	31,037	39,656	Southern Red Sea
7	Massawa	15,441	36,700	Northern Red Sea
8	Adi Quala	14,465	34,589	Debub
9	Senafe	14,019	31,831	Debub
10	Dekemhare	17,290	31,000	Debub
11	Segheneyti	13,328	27,656	Debub
12	Nakfa	N/A	20,222	Northern Red Sea
13	Adi Keyh	8,691	19,304	Debub
14	Barentu	2,541	15,467	Gash-Barka
15	Beilul	N/A	14,055	Southern Red Sea
16	Edd	N/A	12,855	Southern Red Sea
17	Ghinda	7,702	10,523	Northern Red Sea
18	Mersa Fatuma	N/A	9,542	Southern Red Sea
19	Himberti	N/A	8,822	Maekel
20	Nefasit	N/A	8,727	Maekel

== Other settlements ==
- Adi Tekelezan
- Afabet
- Areza
- Badme
- Bisha
- Dairo Paulos
- Debaysima
- Digsa
- Emba Derho
- Quazien
- Filfil
- Goquat
- Hazega
- Kudo-Felasi
- Matara
- Mai Mine
- Mersa Gulbub
- Mersa Teklay
- Omhajer
- Gergef
- Per Tokar
- Quatit
- Rahayta
- Sebderat
- Tserona
- Tsazega
- Zula
- Zahgir
- Adi-Abeto
- Kudofelasi
- Molki
- Shambuko
- Golij
- Tara Emni
- Shakaeyamo
- Emni hayli
- Knafna
- Tsorona
- Enda gergs
- Haykota
- Fortosawa
- Sh'eb
- Ela Bered
- Adi Qontsi
- Meka'ika
