= Gash-Setit =

Protected area in Eritrea

Gash-Setit Wildlife Reserve
- IUCN category IV (habitat/species management area)
- Location within Eritrea
- Location: Omhajer District and Haykota District, Eritrea
- Nearest city: Tesseney
- Coordinates: 15.103°N 36.845°E
- Area: 709 km^{2} (274 mi^{2})
- Established: 1959

Gash-Setit is a 709 km^{2} (274 mi^{2}) designated national wildlife reserve and historical area of western Eritrea where it's considered to be the northernmost point of Africa for elephant habitat. It is located in much of Omhajer District and Haykota District between southwest of Haykota and the market town of Tesseney in the Gash-Barka region. The name is derived from the two rivers, the Gash and the Setit (Tekezé) River. It is the historical area of the Kunama people and a very fertile region extending to the Sudan border.

Gash-Setit has been part of the Gash-Barka Zone of Eritrea since 1991.

== Economy ==
It is often referred to as "the breadbasket of Eritrea" because the area is agriculturally rich and more fertile than most of Eritrea. Crops such as sorghum, millet, legumes, cotton and sesame are produced in the area. The high agricultural potential of the area was recognized by the Italians during the occupation and in 1928 they established the Alighidir cotton plantation in the area which provided cotton for the Barattolo Textile Factory in Asmara. Citrus fruits and bananas were also produced in the Gash-Setit but many of the plantations were destroyed during the Eritrean War of Independence in the 1960s or by the Ethiopian army during the 2000 conflict.

The Tigre and Hedareb populations which introduced pastoral farming and grazing in the area has come into conflict with the Kunama peoples with the result that economic production in the area is now concentrated on arable farming .

== Politics ==
Formerly part of Ethiopia, in 1992 according to the United Nations Observer Mission to Verify the Referendum in Eritrea a total of 73,236 people out of 73,506 surveyed in the area had voted for Eritrea to become an independent nation The park was under the administration of Germano Nati.

== Geography ==
Settlements within the area with names giving testimony to the former Italian occupation of the area include Arcugi, Giamal Biscia which lie inside the park and the villages of Geniti and Ameli lay outside the area to the south. The village of Adendema lies at the north-east corner of the Gash-Setit.
