= Adendema =

Adendema أدندما
- Location in Eritrea
- Coordinates: 15°7′N 37°0′E
- Country: Eritrea
- Region: Gash-Barka
- District: Haykota District
- Elevation: 696 m (2,283 ft)

Population
  - Total: 2,504
- Time zone: UTC+3 (East Africa Time)
- Area code: +291

Adendema (Arabic: أدندما) is a village in western Eritrea with a population of 2,504 people. It is located 5.8 miles south-west of the district capital of Haykota in Haykota District in the Gash-Barka region. It lies on the north-east boundary of the Gash-Setit wildlife reserve.

Nearby towns and villages include Bitama (13.4 nm), Elit (7.0 nm), Moso (23.9 nm), Geniti (13.3 nm) and Giamal Biscia (9.1 nm).
