= Algheden =

Algheden is the name of two towns in the western Gash-Barka region of Eritrea:

- Algheden, Dghe, Dghe District
- Algheden, Forto, Forto District
