= Tauda =

Tauda تاودا
- Town
- Location in Eritrea
- Coordinates: 15°10′N 37°28′E
- Country: Eritrea
- Region: Gash-Barka
- Subregion: Gogne
- Elevation: 915 m (3,002 ft)

Tauda (Arabic: تاودا) is a town in western Eritrea.

== Location ==
The settlement is located in the Gogne subregion of the Gash-Barka region. It is situated 6.2 miles (10.0 km) northeast of the district town of Gogne, and 8 miles (13 km) northwest of Barentu city.

Nearby towns and villages include Alegada (6.1 mi (9.8 km)), Gogne (6.2 mi (10.0 km)), Ili (6.3 mi (10.1 km)), Gonye (7.7 mi (12.4 km)), Dedda (7.8 mi (12.6 km)), Mescul (8.2 mi (13.2 km)) and Markaughe (12.4 mi (20.0 km)).
