= Abaredda =

Abaredda أباردا
- Town
- Location in Eritrea
- Coordinates: 15°25′N 37°36′E
- Country: Eritrea
- Region: Gash-Barka
- District: Mogolo
- Elevation: 641 m (2,103 ft)

Abaredda (Arabic: أباردا) is a town in western Eritrea. It is located in Mogolo subregion in the Gash-Barka region.

Nearby towns and villages include Mogolo, Hambok, Bisha, Algheden and Attai.
