= Elit, Eritrea =

Elit إليت
- Location in Eritrea
- Coordinates: 15°14′N 37°0′E
- Country: Eritrea
- Region: Gash-Barka
- District: Haykota District
- Elevation: 735 m (2,411 ft)

Elit (Arabic: إليت) is a village in western Eritrea approximately 30 km north-east of Teseney. It is located in Haykota District lying 9.8 km (5.3 nmi) north-west of the district capital of Haykota.

Nearby towns and villages include Bitama (16.1 km or 8.7 nmi), Algheden (28.7 km or 15.5 nmi), (9.8 km or 5.3 nmi), Antalla (23.5 km or 12.7 nmi) and Adendema (13.0 km or 7.0 nmi).
