= Antalla =

Antalla أنتلا
- Location in Eritrea
- Coordinates: 15°16′N 37°13′E
- Country: Eritrea
- Region: Gash-Barka
- District: Haykota
- Elevation: 914 m (2,999 ft)

Antalla (Arabic: أنتلا) is a village in the western Gash-Barka region of Eritrea. It is situated approximately 50 km north-west of the town of Barentu, which is the capital of Gash-Barka region.

== Location ==
The town is located in the Haykota District, lying 9.7 miles from the district capital of Haykota in the Gash-Barka region.

Nearby towns and villages Elit (12.7 nm), Algheden (13.3 nm), Ad Casub (8.9 nm), Gonye (9.0 nm) and Markaughe (10.0 nm).
