= Chibabo, Eritrea =

Chibabo كيبابو
- Village
- Location in Eritrea
- Coordinates: 15°17′N 37°37′E
- Country: Eritrea
- Region: Gash-Barka
- District: Mogolo
- Elevation: 710 m (2,330 ft)

Chibabo (Arabic: كيبابو) is a village in western Eritrea. It is located in Mogolo subregion in the Gash-Barka region.

Nearby towns and villages include Aredda (1.4 nm), the district capital Mogolo (2.3 nm), Attai (4.4 nm), Aula (7.6 nm), and Samero (7.6 nm).
