= Markaughe =

Markaughe مركاوغ
- Town
- Location in Eritrea
- Coordinates: 15°21′N 37°22′E
- Country: Eritrea
- Region: Gash-Barka
- Subregion: Gogne
- Elevation: 813 m (2,667 ft)

Markaughe (Arabic: مركاوغ) is a town in western Eritrea. It is located in the Gogne subregion of the Gash-Barka region, approximately 35 km northwest of Barentu.

== Towns and villages ==
Nearby towns and villages include:

- Ad Casub (5.7 nm)
- Antalla
- Gogne (11.2 nm)
- Hambok (6.5 nm)
- Mescul (8.3 nm)
- Tauda (12.4 nm)
