= Mescul =

Mescul مسكول
- Town
- Location in Eritrea.
- Coordinates: 15°18′N 37°30′E
- Country: Eritrea
- Region: Gash-Barka
- Subregion: Mogolo
- Elevation: 1,047 m (3,435 ft)
- Time zone: UTC+3 (EAT)

Mescul (Arabic: مسكول) is a town in western Eritrea.

== Location ==
The settlement is located in the Mogolo subregion of the Gash-Barka region.

Nearby towns and villages include Attai (5.7 nm), Aredda (6.1 nm), Hambok (6.3 nm), Dedda (6.3 nm), Tauda (8.2 nm) and Markaughe (8.3 nm).
