= Arcugi =

Arcugi أركوجي
- Village
- Location in Eritrea
- Coordinates: 14°39′N 36°50′E
- Country: Eritrea
- Region: Gash-Barka
- Subregion: Omhajer
- Elevation: 780 m (2,560 ft)

Arcugi (Arabic: أركوجي) is a village in western Eritrea. It is located in Omhajer District in the Gash-Barka region. It lies inside the Gash-Setit wildlife reserve 6 kilometres south-west of Giamal Biscia.

As the name may suggest, the village was founded by the Italians during the occupation.

It lies 12.7 miles south-east of Teseney.
