= Libon =

Libon may refer to:

- Libon (architect), an ancient Greek architect
- Libon (Bithynia), a town of ancient Bithynia
- Libon (service), a VoIP and instant messaging application for smartphones
- Libon, Albay, Philippines
- A village in the Logo Anseba district of Eritrea

== See also ==
- fr:Libon, Ivan Terlecki (1972), French cartoonist
