= University of Campania Luigi Vanvitelli =

Italian public university

- Former name: Second University of Naples
- Type: Public
- Established: 1990
- Affiliations: UNIMED, BioGeM
- Rector: Gianfranco Nicoletti
- Director: Carmela Luise
- Students: 25,299
- Location: Naples, Caserta, Italy
- Campus: Multiple campuses
- Website: unicampania.it

The University of Campania Luigi Vanvitelli (acronym UniCampania, Second University of Naples or SUN until 22 November 2016) is an Italian public university established in Naples in 1990.

The teaching locations are distributed between Naples, where one of the two rectorates is located, Caserta, where the legal seat with a second rectorate is located, and between the provinces of Naples, Caserta, Avellino and Benevento.

== History ==
=== Origins ===
The history of the current university, formally established in the 1990s, is linked to the medical tradition of the University of Naples, the Studium founded in 1224 by Frederick II of Hohenstaufen and later named University of Naples Federico II. The Faculty of Medicine and Surgery of the latter was in fact split off to constitute the new university.

The first seat of the Faculty of Medicine and Surgery was the First Policlinic of Naples, built between 1899 and 1907 to a design by the engineers of the Società per il Risanamento Pierpaolo Quaglia and Guglielmo Melisurgo. The complex arose in the area of the monasteries of the Sapienza and della Croce di Lucca. The demolition of the pre-existing buildings aroused the protests of Benedetto Croce, who in 1903 appealed to the mayor Luigi Miraglia from the pages of the journal Napoli nobilissima; part of the church of the Croce di Lucca was preserved. Beneath the complex are remains of ancient Neapolis, in particular in the area of the acropolis.

Around the policlinic is arranged a system of historic buildings used for teaching and research. The Sant'Andrea delle Dame complex, founded in the 16th century and with a cloister completed in the early years of the 17th century, preserves works by Belisario Corenzio and Giacinto Diano; today it houses university facilities of the medical area. The cloisters of Santa Patrizia, a complex dating back to the 13th century, house the Institute of Human Anatomy and the MUSA. The structure was inhabited by Basilian monks and later by Benedictine nuns until 1648. In 1901 the rector of the University of Naples Giovanni Antonelli transferred the Anatomical Institute and the Museum of Human Anatomy into the former monastery. The anatomical collection was formed through the activity of several generations of scholars, including Marco Aurelio Severino and Domenico Cotugno. After the losses and damage suffered during the Second World War and the 1980 earthquake, in 1985 work began for the safeguarding and arrangement of the museum; a subsequent reorganization led to the inventory of about 3,000 exhibits. The pharmacology section of MUSA preserves the heritage of the Cabinet of Demonstrative Materia Medica founded in 1862 by Francesco Briganti. The phrase «Hic mors gaudet succurrere vitae», associated with the tradition of anatomical rooms, is linked to the memory of the physician and anatomopathologist Luciano Armanni.

The Neapolitan medical school between the 19th and early 20th centuries included figures such as Antonio Cardarelli, holder of the chair of medical clinic from 1893 to 1923, and Giuseppe Moscati, his pupil; the physiologist Filippo Bottazzi also belongs to the same scientific tradition. The current university is therefore not a medieval institution, but gathers part of a didactic and scientific tradition developed in the Neapolitan university over the preceding centuries.

=== Establishment ===
The constitution of the new university was provided for by the decree of the President of the Council of Ministers of 12 May 1989, within the framework of the four-year development plan for universities 1986-1990, with the aim of decongesting the University of Naples through the splitting off of the Faculty of Medicine and Surgery. Law 7 August 1990, no. 245 sanctioned the establishment of the Second University of Naples and delegated to implementing regulations the constitution of the faculties and the activation of degree courses. There followed the ministerial decree of 25 March 1991 and the decree of the President of the Republic of 28 October 1991, which established the faculties of Mathematical, Physical and Natural Sciences and of Humanities and Philosophy within the framework of the three-year development plan 1991-1993. The D.P.R. of 27 April 1992 established the location of the structures and fixed the legal seat at Caserta.

Autonomous activity officially began on 1 November 1992 with about 19,000 enrolled students and eight faculties distributed over five territorial locations. The rectorate had seats in Naples, in via Santa Maria di Costantinopoli, and in Caserta, in the rooms of the Royal Palace of Caserta. Subsequently, the former Post Office building of viale Ellittico was acquired by the university and destined for offices and university activities.

=== Development ===
In the 1990s the activities, the enrolled students and the teaching and administrative staff increased. In 1992 the First Policlinic of Naples became the seat of the Faculty of Medicine and Surgery of the new university, which inherited the Neapolitan structures that had belonged to the first medical faculty of the University of Naples. In 1995 a memorandum of understanding laid the premises for the construction of a new university policlinic in Caserta; work began in 2003. In 2001 the Faculty of Psychology was established, constituted by splitting off from the Faculty of Humanities and Philosophy. In 2005, within the framework of collaboration with the INNOVA interuniversity consortium, the CIRCE laboratory was established in San Nicola la Strada, dedicated to the study of stellar nuclei and the dating of archaeological finds.

The expansion of the university was accompanied by the recovery of buildings of historical importance. In Santa Maria Capua Vetere, in 1992, the Faculty of Law settled in Palazzo Melzi, built in the 17th century as the seat of the archiepiscopal mensa and became the seat of the tribunal in the Napoleonic period; the tribunal left the palace in 1987. The building was restored between 2002 and 2006 and preserves on its façade the inscription «Palazzo di Giustizia». The Department of Humanities and Cultural Heritage was based from 1992 to 2014 in the monastery of San Francesco da Paola, built on a Roman cryptoporticus. In Capua the Department of Economics occupies the ancient convent of the Dame Monache, whose origin is placed between the 9th and 10th centuries and which was restored between 2000 and 2007.

In Aversa the Department of Engineering is based in the Real Casa dell'Annunziata, built in the early 14th century as a welfare institution promoted by the Angevins; the Department of Architecture and Industrial Design is instead housed in the abbey complex of San Lorenzo ad septimum, along the ancient Via Consolare Campana. In Caserta the Department of Political Science, active in its current seat since the academic year 2011-2012, is housed in the former Post Office building of viale Ellittico, purchased by the university in 2006.

With the law of 30 December 2010, no. 240 the university reorganized itself into departments; the current structure comprises sixteen departments. Part of the historical-scientific heritage of the university, comprising collections of anatomy, pharmacology and stomatology and a bibliographic fund, is gathered in the University Museum of Sciences and Arts (MUSA).

=== The change of name ===
From the 2000s the name of the university was discussed. On 28 July 2010 the Regional Council of Campania approved an agenda proposing to transform the name into «University of Caserta – Terra di Lavoro». At the inauguration of the academic year 2014-2015 the rector Giuseppe Paolisso, elected in 2014, announced the evaluation of three hypotheses: «University of Caserta», «University Luigi Vanvitelli» and «University of Campania – Luigi Vanvitelli». On 31 March 2015 the academic senate chose the name «University of Campania – Luigi Vanvitelli» and began the procedure for ministerial approval. The change was accompanied by an international competition for the new visual identity of the university.

The process concluded in 2016 with the ministerial approval of the new statute, published in the Official Gazette on 8 November and in force from 23 November 2016. The name pays homage to Luigi Vanvitelli, architect of the Royal Palace of Caserta. The reference to «Campania» recalls the distribution of the departments between the Metropolitan City of Naples and the provinces of Caserta and Avellino.

== Territorial structure and organization ==
=== Teaching structures ===
The locations are distributed over the territory of the Campania region: in the Province of Caserta, in the Metropolitan City of Naples, in the Province of Avellino and in the Province of Benevento (the last two provinces are peripheral and detached locations) almost all in structures of historical and cultural interest. The university has two rectorate seats, one in Caserta which constitutes the legal seat and one in Naples in via Santa Maria di Costantinopoli near the Azienda Ospedaliera Universitaria "Luigi Vanvitelli".

In Naples are located the departments of the medical area, the Azienda Ospedaliera Universitaria "Luigi Vanvitelli", the University Museum of Sciences and Arts (MUSA) and some service centres of the university, located mainly inside and in the immediate vicinity of the historic centre of Naples. A university sports committee and a polyphonic choir are also active.

Following the reorganization pursuant to law 30 December 2010, no. 240, the university is divided into sixteen university departments, one university school, about sixty medical specialization schools and one school of specialization for the legal professions. The departments are 16:

==== University departments ====
- Woman, Child and General and Specialist Surgery ‒ Naples
- Precision Medicine ‒ Naples
- Experimental Medicine ‒ Naples
- Multidisciplinary Department of Medical-Surgical and Dental Specialties ‒ Naples
- Mental Health and Physics and Preventive Medicine ‒ Naples
- Advanced Medical and Surgical Sciences ‒ Naples
- Translational Medical Sciences ‒ Naples
- Architecture and Industrial Design ‒ Aversa
- Economics ‒ Capua
- Law ‒ Santa Maria Capua Vetere
- Engineering ‒ Aversa
- Humanities and Cultural Heritage ‒ Santa Maria Capua Vetere
- Mathematics and Physics ‒ Caserta
- Psychology ‒ Caserta
- Environmental, Biological and Pharmaceutical Sciences and Technologies ‒ Caserta
- Political Science ‒ Caserta

==== University Schools ====
- School of Medicine and Surgery

=== Research centres ===
Research activities are carried out within various structures, characterized by specific operating methods and purposes. Among these, departments represent the organizational units tasked with promoting and coordinating research activities. At the same time, research centres focus on projects requiring collaboration between competences belonging to multiple research departments or, in some cases, multiple universities. They are:

- Regional Centre of Pharmacovigilance
- CIAMC Research Centre on Environmental Pollution and Cardiovascular Diseases
- C.I.R.N. Interuniversity Research Centre for Neuroscience
- Regional reference centre for patients affected by cheilognathopalatoschisis and oro-maxillo-facial malformations
- CIRLaM Centre for Interdisciplinary Research in Language and Medicine
- CERM Interuniversity Research Centre on Sustainable Management of Energy Resources
- CRECS Research Centre in Cognitive and Experimental Economics
- COSME Research Centre Observatory on Southern Europe
- C.I.R.T.I.B.S. Interuniversity Research Centre on Innovative Technologies for Instrumental Goods
- OEPO Observatory on Religious Bodies, Ecclesiastical Heritage and Non-Profit Organizations The University collaborates with public and private research bodies, both nationally and internationally, including Biogem, a scientific centre specializing in molecular genetics and biotechnology.

=== Service centres ===
The Service Centres support and optimize academic, research and administrative activities.

- University Library System (SBA): The University Library System coordinates all the libraries of the University of Campania Luigi Vanvitelli. It deals with offering support to teaching and research, managing a large heritage of books, periodicals and electronic resources. It also provides consultancy, training and access to online catalogues, contributing to the creation of a stimulating study and research environment for students and lecturers.

Logo of MUSA

- University Museum of Sciences and Arts (MUSA): MUSA is the cultural and scientific centre that gathers and manages the museum collections of the University. The museum's mission is the promotion and enhancement of the scientific and artistic heritage through exhibitions, cultural events and educational activities. The centre contributes to the dissemination of scientific culture and interaction with the public, seeking to raise awareness among the academic community and the territory towards the importance of research in sciences and arts.

Logo of the SCUP service

- University Centre for University Psychological Clinical Services (SCUP): academic structure that integrates clinical activity, scientific research and training in the field of mental health. The centre coordinates in a unified manner the university psychological and diagnostic services, collaborating with territorial and socio-health bodies to offer services based on scientific evidence. Its main purposes include the promotion of active inclusion for disabilities and SLDs, the prevention of distress and academic drop-out, and the development of research projects in national and international networks. SCUP also supports teaching through internships and advanced training courses (such as ECM programmes), finally carrying out scientific dissemination activities aimed at citizens.
- Centre for Networks, Systems and IT Services (CRESSI): CRESSI is the centre that manages all the IT infrastructures and networks of the University. It deals with guaranteeing the availability, security and reliability of IT systems, supporting administrative, teaching and research activities. The centre provides technical assistance, manages e-learning platforms and ensures the correct functioning of the digital resources available to students, lecturers and administrative staff.
- University Service Centre for Research (CSR): This centre is dedicated to supporting scientific research activities in the University. It supports researchers, PhD students and research fellows in all phases of the process, from planning to the realization of research projects. The centre also offers training, consultancy and management of resources for research, facilitating access to funding and collaboration with scientific bodies and institutions.
- Service Centre for Communication (CSC): The Service Centre for Communication manages the institutional image of the University, curating internal and external communication. It deals with the promotion of academic, scientific and cultural activities through various channels, including social media, the website and public events. The centre also deals with relations with the media and the management of communication in the context of emergencies or extraordinary events, guaranteeing a correct dissemination of information towards public opinion.
- The library system

The university libraries are organized in the University Library System and grouped by disciplinary area. The libraries are distributed in a widespread manner throughout the Campania territory.

- Library of the Departments of the Medical Area
- Library of the Department of Architecture and Industrial Design
- Library of the Department of Economics
- Library of the Department of Engineering
- Library of the Department of Law "Enrico de Nicola"
- Library of the Department of Humanities and Cultural Heritage
- Library of the Department of Mathematics and Physics
- Library of the Department of Psychology
- Library of the Department of Food, Biological and Pharmaceutical Sciences and Technologies
- Library of the Department of Political Science

The University also offers a wide range of digital resources through the University Library System. Users can access online catalogues, subscription and open access databases, as well as internet resources divided by disciplinary areas.

The Service Centre of the University Library System, based in Naples, manages and coordinates the activities related to the library services of the University, with a specific focus on cataloguing and bibliographic standardization, the digitalization of services, the management of documentation and the dissemination of information. It also offers support to users to allow optimal use of the bibliographic and documentary resources available in the University.

=== Third mission and media ===
==== Third mission ====
The third mission concerns the enhancement of research and the transfer of knowledge to society, alongside teaching and research. The University promotes collaborations with institutions, businesses and bodies of the territory, supporting innovation, protection of intellectual property, spin-offs and start-ups, as well as scientific, cultural and social dissemination activities.

Among the public engagement activities organized by the University are cultural reviews such as Specchi di Musica, dedicated to the diffusion of musical culture through concerts and meetings open to the public, and Incontri alla Reggia, a cycle of conferences and debates hosted at the Royal Palace of Caserta, aimed at discussion on current affairs, culture, research and innovation. Through these initiatives the University promotes dialogue with the territory and the dissemination of knowledge beyond the academic sphere.

==== Vanvitelli Magazine ====
Logo of the official periodical of the University

VanvitelliMagazine is the online institutional periodical of the University of Campania "Luigi Vanvitelli", produced by the University's Communication Service Centre. It constitutes the main information tool on university activities and publishes news regarding scientific research, teaching, third mission, cultural events, initiatives addressed to students and staff, as well as interviews with lecturers, executives and the Rector. The portal also includes a calendar of institutional events and makes available the daily press review dedicated to the University. The magazine has the function of promoting and disseminating the activities of the University both within the academic community and towards the external public, through the institutional website and the University's communication channels.

==== Polyphonic Choir ====
The Polyphonic Choir of the University of Campania Luigi Vanvitelli is a university choral ensemble founded within the framework of the Third Mission activities of the University. The choir promotes the cultural and musical participation of the academic community and dialogue between university and territory. The group is directed by Maestro Carlo Forni and composed of students, lecturers and technical-administrative staff of the University, for a total of about forty choristers, also including the participation of Erasmus students from various European countries.

The concert activity takes place both in the academic sphere and in collaboration with institutions and bodies of the territory. In this context, the choir has held concerts and participated in initiatives with numerous health, cultural and associative organizations, including the Santobono-Pausilipon Hospital, the Community of Sant'Egidio, AISLA (Italian Amyotrophic Lateral Sclerosis Association), ALICe (Association for the Fight against Cerebral Stroke), Città della Scienza, Legambiente, Rotary International and Lions Clubs International.

== University locations ==
=== Naples ===
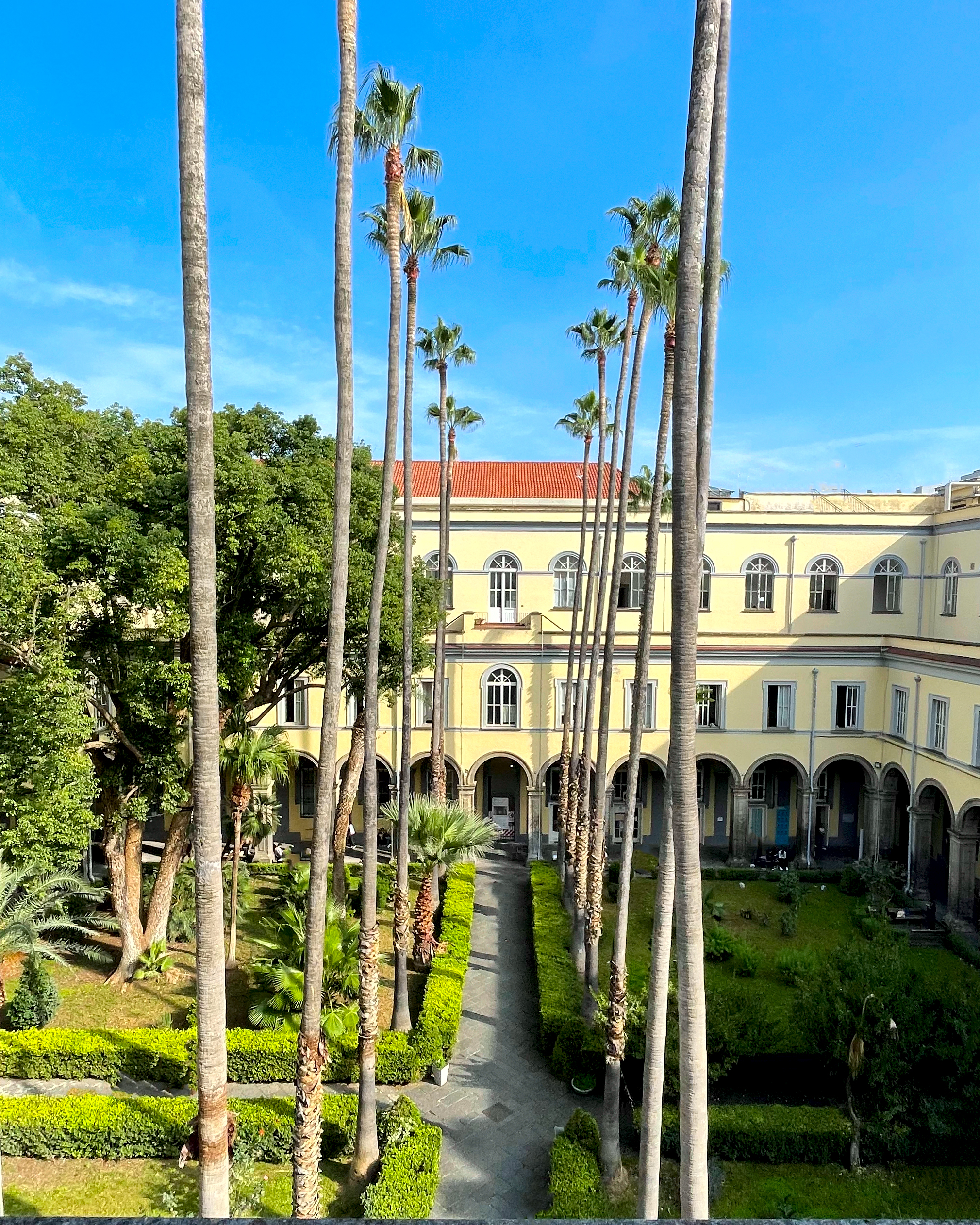
Interior of the cloister of the Complesso di Sant'Andrea delle Dame

Hall of Busts, at the Pediatric Clinic of the AOU "Luigi Vanvitelli"

Grand Cloister of the Santa Patrizia Complex.

Commemorative plaque of the phrase pronounced by Luciano Armanni, today displayed in autopsy rooms worldwide.

In the regional capital is located the Azienda Ospedaliera Universitaria "Luigi Vanvitelli", the School of Medicine and Surgery, the eight departments of the medical disciplines and other administrative offices. The training activities of the degree course in medicine and surgery take place at the following structures located, for the most part, in the full historic centre of Naples.

- First Policlinic of Naples (Old Policlinic): early 20th-century complex located above the remains of ancient Neapolis, seat of the First Faculty of Medicine and Surgery of the then Second University of Naples, now become the University of Campania Luigi Vanvitelli. It currently houses several premises of the AOU Luigi Vanvitelli and is one of the training centres for young doctors of the同名 university.
- Complesso di Sant'Andrea delle Dame: Baroque cloister built in the 16th century adjacent to the First Policlinic. It comprises the church of the same name, as well as several 17th-century frescoes by Bellisario Corenzio and Giacinto Diano, an altar inlaid with mother-of-pearl by Dionisio Lazzari, statues by Pietro Ghetti and a majolica floor of the Giustiniani. Today it houses several classrooms for teaching and study, as well as the medical area library of the University.
- Pediatric Clinic: building inaugurated in 1929, but already envisaged in the 1896 project for the arrangement of the university clinics signed by Melisurgo and Quaglia. The original project was later overturned, giving rise to the current structure, conceived as the "organization needed for the great battle of childhood". It was Rocco Jemma, called to Naples in 1913 to succeed Francesco Fede, who wanted and realized the new pediatric clinic, inaugurated on 8 January 1929 in the presence of Prince Umberto of Savoy and Maria José. The clinic also preserves an important artistic heritage: in the "hall of busts" there are sculptures dedicated to figures linked to the history of Neapolitan pediatrics, including Francesco Fede, to whom the first free course in medicine in Naples and the birth of the pediatric clinic are due. One year after Jemma's death, which occurred in 1949, a marble bust was erected in the clinic in his memory. The decorations of the attic were made by the Neapolitan artist Giuseppe Aprea, who for the central roundel chose a representation of maternity dated 1927. In the paintings of the large amphitheatre hall are depicted the "cardinal ages of childhood": breastfeeding, first steps, first games and school. In the garden there is also the 17th-century arch of San Gaudioso, a testimony to the historical and artistic stratification of the complex
- Complesso di San Gaudioso: seat of the Odontostomatological Clinic of the Luigi Vanvitelli University Hospital. It is an ancient monastic complex located between via Luigi De Crecchio and vico San Gaudioso, in the historic centre of Naples, whose origins date back to the 5th century, when, according to tradition, it was founded by Settimio Celio Gaudioso, bishop of Bithynia, probably on the remains of a temple dedicated to Demeter. Expanded over the Middle Ages and destined for Benedictine nuns, it reached its maximum development between the 16th and 17th centuries. In 1560 the architect Giovanni Francesco di Palma designed the cloister, while around 1630 Cosimo Fanzago intervened in the architectural rearrangement of the complex, realizing the monumental entrance with a double-ramp marble staircase and balustrade, still preserved. In 1799, during the clashes following the proclamation of the Neapolitan Republic, the church was destroyed by a fire, with the loss of numerous works of art. During the 19th century the monastery was destined for scientific and health uses, becoming the seat of a university clinic. The complex was demolished in 1920 to allow the construction of new hospital structures; after the Second World War, the area resumed its health function and housed the Dental and Stomatological Clinic. Of the ancient settlement remain the Fanzaghian staircase with the monumental access arch, the perimeter wall, the piperno portal on vico San Gaudioso and some traces of the cloister.
- Santa Patrizia Complex: built in the 13th century near the First Policlinic. It is composed of the major cloister, the minor cloister and the church of the same name. It is the seat of the museum of human anatomy, due to the preservation of preparations by Andrea Vesalius and Francesco Citarelli. In addition to preserving frescoes by Luigi Rodriguez, there is a monument in memory of Giovanni Antonelli, formerly rector of the University of Naples Federico II and a marble epigraph bearing "Hic mors gaudet succurrere vitae" ("Here death rejoices in coming to the aid of life"), pronounced by Luciano Armanni and displayed today in many autopsy rooms.
- Ospedali dei Colli: nationally important hospital company comprising the Monaldi Hospital, the Cotugno and the CTO. Here is based the Department of Translational Medical Sciences where some departments of the University Hospital are hosted, as well as constituting a centre for the theoretical and practical training of students belonging to the School.

=== Santa Maria Capua Vetere ===
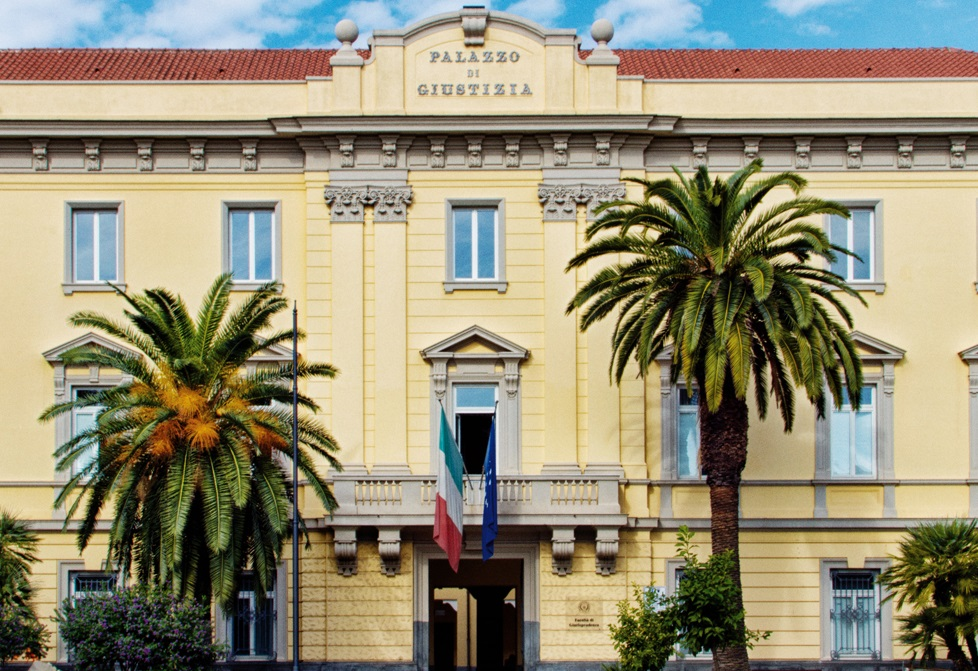
Front view of Palazzo Melzi, seat of the Department of Law.

Interior of Palazzo Melzi, seat of the Department of Law.

In Santa Maria Capua Vetere are located the Departments of Law and of Humanities and Cultural Heritage. The Department of Law is located at Palazzo Melzi together with the school of specialization for the legal professions, in the heart of the historic centre of Santa Maria Capua Vetere, next to the Cathedral of Santa Maria Maggiore. The building has a long history that has its roots in the 17th century, when it was built between 1627 and 1630 as an episcopal mensa desired by the bishops of Capua, Girolamo Costanzo and his successors Camillo and Giovanni Antonio Melzi. During the 18th century, the palace was expanded and embellished, assuming its current appearance. In 1809, following the reorganization of the legal system during the Napoleonic period, the palace became the seat of the Court of First Instance and of the Criminal Court of the province of Terra di Lavoro. To adapt to these new functions, the building underwent significant restructuring interventions, including those directed by the architects Giuseppe Sticco and Eleuterio Abbatecola between 1898 and 1904. Subsequently, in 1928, a new wing was built for the Court of Assizes to a design by the architects Domenico Morelli and Giuseppe Parisi. In the period in which it housed the Tribunal, the palace also saw the installation of temporary prisons in its underground premises, before the construction of the new Bourbon prison in the former convent of the Paolotti of Santa Maria via Coeli. With the dismissal of the Tribunal and the transfer of the judicial offices to the modern seat in Piazza della Resistenza, the palace was acquired by the university. The building has undergone careful restoration that has affected both the external façades and the internal spaces, restoring them to their late 19th-century appearance and adapting them to the teaching and research needs of the Department of Law.

The Department of Humanities and Cultural Heritage was located – from 1992 to 2014 – at the medieval monastery dedicated to San Francesco da Paola. This structure at the beginning of the 17th century was occupied by the minor friars of the order of San Francesco da Paola and became a monastery, built on an ancient cryptoporticus Roman, until in 1738 Bourbon soldiers were housed there and from 6 February 1807 it was transformed into a prison. The Department of Humanities and Cultural Heritage is located at the aula of via Perla which also serves that of Law.

=== Aversa ===
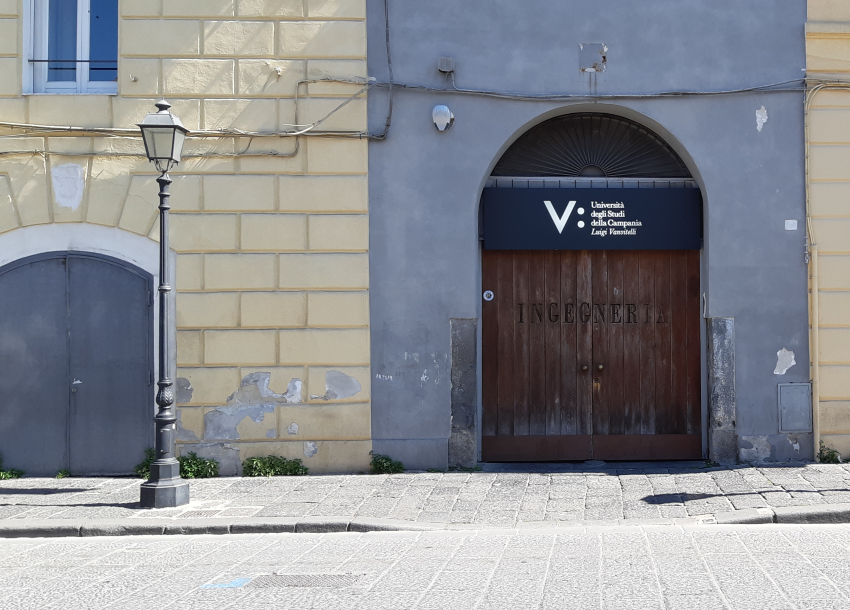
Entrance to the complex of the Real Casa dell'Annunziata, seat of the Department of Engineering located in the city of Aversa.

In the city of Aversa are based the Department of Engineering and that of Architecture and Industrial Design. The first is located in the complex of the Real Casa dell'Annunziata, built around the beginning of the 14th century. The complex was among those religious institutions with welfare purposes promoted by the Angevins also for the control of the territory. There is also an lecture hall, located in via Michelangelo Buonarroti.

The second is based in the church of San Lorenzo ad septimum which rises in a locality that already in ancient times had characteristics of great interest, on the ancient Via Campana ad septimum, that is, at the seventh mile of the city of Capua. The monumental complex comprises the church of the same name and is built around the cloister.

Cloister of the seat of the Department of Economics

=== Capua ===
Entrance of the Department of Economics, at the former "Ettore Fieramosca" Barracks

In Capua is located the complex that houses the Department of Economics in Corso Gran Priorato di Malta. Originally born as a monastery and known as the Convent of the Dame Monache, the building would date back to the 9th-10th century, following the destruction of the monastery of Santa Maria in Cingla in Alife by the Saracens in the year 847. The monastery was built on the ancient via Silicis, a paved road today identified with the Corso Gran Priorato di Malta. Over the centuries, the complex has undergone various modifications and expansions. Between the 16th and 17th centuries, it was transformed into a cloistered monastery through interventions guided by the architect Benvenuto Tortelli, known for his work on religious buildings such as the basilica of San Domenico Maggiore and the church of Santa Maria Donnaregina Vecchia in Naples. During this period grilles were installed on the windows and the church was restructured in Baroque style. With the Royal Decree of 17 September 1812, the monastery was acquired by the State and destined for military use, assuming the name of "Ettore Fieramosca" Barracks; the structure maintained this function until the 1970s. Subsequently, the complex was restored between 2000 and 2007. Today, with a covered area of about 11,600 m², it houses all the academic and administrative activities of the university department.

=== Caserta ===
The provincial capital hosts some administrative offices and four departments: the Department of Psychology which replaced the old faculty created in 2001 by splitting off from the Faculty of Humanities and Philosophy, the Department of Environmental, Biological and Pharmaceutical Sciences and Technologies and the Department of Mathematics and Physics which have also replaced the previous faculties and are located like them in the city's scientific centre, in viale Abraham Lincoln.

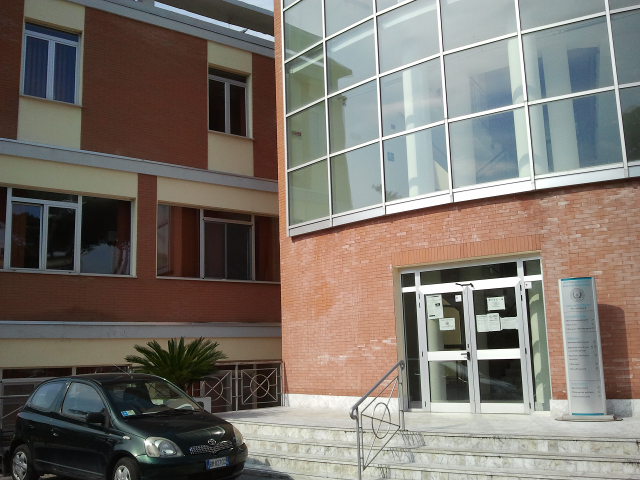
Detail of the scientific centre of Caserta.

The Department of Political Science, from the academic year 2011-2012, is instead located in the complex of viale Ellittico in a building previously owned by Poste Italiane and purchased by the university in 2006. The latter replaced the previous faculty, which had originally been based in the monumental complex of the Belvedere di San Leucio, in San Leucio, once a municipality and later a hamlet of Caserta, which began teaching activity in the academic year 2006-2007 with the degree course in political science. Finally, at the city's directional centre – in the locality San Benedetto – is housed the Caserta seat of the master's degree course in medicine and surgery which makes use of an agreement with the hospital of Caserta and other Neapolitan structures.

The construction site of the policlinic under construction is always in San Benedetto, in the area of the locality Lo Uttaro near Maddaloni, in the eastern part of the city, close to the Strada statale 700 della Reggia di Caserta.

== The University Museum of Sciences and Arts (MUSA) ==
Anatomical Museum of Naples, located in the historic centre of the City and owned by the University of Campania "Luigi Vanvitelli".

The University Museum of Sciences and Arts (MUSA) - located in Naples at the Institute of Human Anatomy in the cloisters of Santa Patrizia - is a museum of the University, composed of several sections with the aim of reconfiguring its cultural and scientific institutions, representing an innovative tool for communication and enhancement of the historical heritage. It constantly compares itself with national and international museum experiences allowing the experimentation of new forms of museum management, paying particular attention to dialogue with local cultural and scientific realities. Among the main purposes of MUSA are the conservation of the museum heritage of the University, also through restoration and maintenance interventions, and the promotion of access to this heritage, both for the academic community and for the external public.

Through this vision, MUSA proposes itself as a centre of excellence for the conservation, enhancement and fruition of the museum heritage, promoting a continuous interaction between academic knowledge, technological innovations and the cultural fabric of the territory.

=== Museum of Human Anatomy ===
The Museum of Human Anatomy, founded between the end of the 18th and the beginning of the 19th century for educational purposes, has been enriched over time also thanks to the evolutionary theories of Charles Darwin, which influenced the expansion of the collections. The museum preserves unique exhibits divided into two main sections.

The normal anatomy section comprises a vast collection of organs, with wax preparations made by Francesco Citarelli and a collection of internal organs, many of which dried. The pathological anatomy section presents a collection of malformed fetuses, cyclopic heads and various exhibits preserved in formalin or alcohol, offering a suggestive vision of anatomical anomalies studied for scientific purposes.

=== Pharmacology ===
The Pharmacology Section originated in 1862 with the founding of the cabinet of materia medica by Francesco Briganti. The collection documents the development of scientific research, with particular attention to pharmacology, through a vast collection of exhibits, historical equipment and ancient texts. The display of the preserved materials allows one to retrace the evolution of pharmacology from its origins to the contemporary era. Among the most significant exhibits is a collection of plant, animal and mineral drugs, dating back to past centuries and catalogued alphabetically, from aconitum napellus to ginger. Alongside the drugs, the collection includes numerous samples of medicinal specialties produced between the 19th and 20th centuries, preserved in their original packaging.

The Pharmacology Section also has one of the oldest libraries of the Faculty of Medicine and Surgery, which preserves complete collections of scientific journals dating back to the last century. The book heritage comprises volumes printed between the 16th century and the first decades of the 20th century, including some texts of particular value. Among these stand out an edition of the Canon of Avicenna printed in Venice in 1582 and several 17th-century volumes dedicated to the art of the Simples and to recipe books, such as the works of Auda da Lantosca (Rome, 1660), Johannes Schroderus (Ulm, 1644) and Timoteo Rosselli (Venice, 1644). Particularly rich is the 18th-century section, which includes a Paduan edition of the Opera Omnia of Thomas Sydenham.

=== Stomatology ===
In the Stomatology section we find the collection De re dentaria apud veteres, an exhibition dedicated to the history of dentistry, with the aim of reconstructing the origins and development of this discipline over time. The project is oriented towards historical research and reflection by scholars of stomatology, documenting the evolution of dental knowledge and practices. The collection comprises a wide range of materials of historical and scientific interest, including documents dating mainly to the end of the 19th and the beginning of the 20th century, dental instruments in use in the first decades of the 20th century and dental technical equipment of the first half of the 20th century. In addition to medical instruments, there are fossil finds, including teeth of domesticated animals dating back to the pre-protohistoric period, which offer insights for the study of the evolution of dentition and dental practices in ancient civilizations.

=== Bibliographic ===
The Bibliographic section is composed of the volumes collected within the University and consists mainly of two funds, that of the Anatomical Museum and that of the Museum of Pharmacology.

The book fund of the Anatomical Museum, located in the historic complex of Santa Patrizia, comprises about 680 volumes, of which 140 are ancient, coming from the former Institutes and Departments of the Faculty of Medicine and Surgery. Among the modern works are collections of German anatomy journals from the late 19th century, anatomical atlases, medical dictionaries and manuals of important scholars of the early 20th century. Among the oldest publications stand out 16th-century editions of the complete works of Galen and Hippocrates, as well as 18th-century texts by Andreas Vesalius and Frederik Ruysch. The latter, a Dutch anatomist and botanist, is known for his chalcographic plates of great artistic and scientific value. The most representative volume of the collection is Anatomiae Universae Icones by Paolo Mascagni, published in Pisa in 1823. It is a large anatomical atlas (100×72 cm), composed of 44 colour chalcographic plates and 44 in black and white, depicting the human body life-size. Due to the rarity and fragility of the work, in 2017 a digitization of the volume was carried out, allowing interactive consultation via touchscreen inside the Anatomical Museum.

The Museum of the Pharmacology Section, located in the complex of Sant'Andrea delle Dame, preserves a book fund of about 200 volumes, datable from the end of the 16th century to the beginning of the 20th century. Among the most relevant works is a Venetian edition of 1582 of the Liber Canonis Medicinae by Avicenna, as well as 17th-century texts on the art of the Simples and on recipe books, including those of Auda da Lantosca (Rome, 1660), Johannes Schöderus (Ulm, 1644) and Timoteo Rosselli (Venice, 1644). The 18th-century fund includes collections of formularies, commentaries on the writings of Hippocrates and texts of institutions of medicine, including a Paduan edition of the Opera Omnia of Thomas Sydenham. The 19th century is represented by national and European pharmacopoeias, treatises on physiology, surgery, pharmaceutical chemistry and microbiology, as well as the first Italian studies based on the positivist and experimental conception of science. The 20th-century fund gathers numerous texts that complete the collection of equipment of the museum.

=== Artistic ===
The Contemporary Art Collection of MUSA was born from the project Le Aule dell'Arte, launched by the Department of Humanities and Cultural Heritage of the Vanvitelli University. Promoted by the teachings of Contemporary Art History and Museology, the project aims to create a dialogue between contemporary art and university spaces, in collaboration with bodies and cultural institutions of the territory. The collection comprises a nucleus of works placed in the seat of the Department of Humanities and Cultural Heritage, testimony to the research and teaching activities carried out in the field of public art.

== Sport ==
The University of Campania Luigi Vanvitelli collaborates with CUS Caserta promoting sports events and activities for students, academic staff and lecturers. University sports activities also take place in collaboration with CUS Napoli.

The Scuderia Vanvitelli is the official Formula Student team of the University of Campania Luigi Vanvitelli. The team is dedicated to the design, construction and competition with racing single-seaters. The Scuderia participates in international competitions such as the Formula SAE. The team is structured in various areas, including mechanics, electronics, aerodynamics and management.

== Chronotaxis of rectors ==
- Domenico Mancino (1990-1998)
- Antonio Grella (1998-2006)
- Francesco Rossi (2006-2014)
- Giuseppe Paolisso (2014-2020)
- Gianfranco Nicoletti (2020-present)

== Bibliography ==
- 1st report on the archives of Italian universities, publication edited by the Ministry for Cultural Heritage and Activities, Padua 2002.

== See also ==
- University of Naples Federico II
- Azienda Ospedaliera Universitaria "Luigi Vanvitelli"
- Biogem
- Caserta
- Luigi Vanvitelli
- Museum of Human Anatomy (University of Campania Luigi Vanvitelli)
- Naples
- Province of Caserta
- Union of Mediterranean Universities
