= Mogolo =

Mogolo موقولو
- Town
- Location in Eritrea
- Coordinates: 15°18′43″N 37°38′31″E
- Country: Eritrea
- Region: Gash-Barka
- District: Mogolo
- Elevation: 675 m (2,215 ft)

Mogolo (Arabic: موقولو) is a city in the western Gash-Barka region of Eritrea.

== Location ==
It is the principal town in the Mogolo district of the Gash-Barka region.

Nearby towns and villages include Chibabo (2.3 nm), Attai (4.1 nm), Abaredda (6.7 nm), Algheden (14.7 nm), Bet Mahala (18.6 nm), Aula (8.0 nm) and Samero (8.0 nm).
