= Logo Anseba subregion =

Coordinates: 15.3842°N 38.5977°E

Logo Anseba
- Subregion
- Interactive map of Logo Anseba
- Country: Eritrea
- Region: Gash-Barka
- Capital: Logo Anseba
- Time zone: UTC+3 (GMT +3)

Logo Anseba subregion (Tigrinya: ንኡስ ዞባ ሎጐ ዓንሰባ)is a subregion in the eastern Gash-Barka region (logo Anseba) of Eritrea. Its capital lies at Logo Anseba.

== Location ==
The region is bordered by the Anseba, Maekel and Debub regions and situated in the highlands of Eritrea. It sits at an altitude between 1600–2400 meters above sea level, with a semi-arid climate.

== Demographics ==
The total population of Logo Anseba is 33,446; it is composed of 13 Kebabis, and 22 villages.

Tigrigna is the main spoken language in the region.

== Economy ==
Most of the inhabitants of Logo Anseba live by farming, cultivating wheat, sorghum, finger millet and pulses. During the dry season from November to March, the inhabitants perform other work such as trade and construction.

== Geography ==
Logo Anseba is the origin for one of the main rivers, the Barka River, which flows all the way into Sudan.

== Kebabis of Logo Anseba ==
1. Dersenei
2. Deki Zeru
3. Adi Na’amen
4. Mellezanai
5. Deki Shehai
6. Mekerka
7. Adi-Hans
8. Liban
9. Adena
10. Habela
11. Deida
12. Kerena Khudo
13. Tslale
14. Deki-Dashim
15. Debri
16. Adi-Werhiseb
