= Dghe =

Dghe دخهي
- Town
- Country: Eritrea
- Region: Gash-Barka
- District: Dghe
- Time zone: UTC+3 (EAT)

Dghe (Arabic: دخهي) is a town in Eritrea. It is located in the Gash-Barka region and is the capital of Dghe District.
