= Hambok =

Hambok همبك
- Location in Eritrea
- Coordinates: 15°24′N 37°28′E
- Country: Eritrea
- Region: Gash-Barka
- District: Gogne District
- Elevation: 770 m (2,530 ft)

Hambok (Arabic: همبك) is a village in western Eritrea. It is located in Gogne District in the Gash-Barka region.

Nearby towns and villages include Kieru (16.7 nm), Ad Casub (10.6 nm), Markaughe (6.5 nm), Bisha (6.8 nm), Adi Ali Bakit (11.1 nm), Attai (7.4 nm), Abaredda (7.8 nm) and Mescul (6.3 nm).
