= Berhan Yekun =

Tigrinya-language publication

Berhan Yekun (Tigrinya: ብርሃን ይኹን, "Let there be Light!") was an early Tigrinya publication of 1912. Its title was borrowed from an annual Swedish Evangelical Mission periodical Varde Ljus! (Swedish for "Let there be Light!"), which was distributed for almost 70 years, beginning in 1893. Its subtitle was given as Tigrinya: ስብከት ዛንታ ምዕዶ ንሕዝቢ አትዮዽያ (Italian: Prediche, racconti e spegazioni edificanti per il popolo etiopico).

== History ==
Unlike the Swedish-language namesake, Berhan Yekun appeared only once. It was edited in 1912 by Olof (Ole) Eriksson at the Swedish Mission Printing Press in Asmara, including 360 pages of text and photos/sketches and contained almost 100 entries of various lengths. The main language used was Tigrinya, with few Amharic articles. The vast majority of entries are translations, primarily from Swedish, but also from English and Italian, into Tigrinya. Most entries are sermons by leaders of the Mission in Sweden and by leading missionaries in Eritrea, both living and dead.

Among the topics presented are: "On the Benefits of Holy Communion", "Unity and Harmony among the Faithful", "Humility, the Care of the Elderly", "On Conquering Sin" and "On Christ's Second Coming". There are also varia, dealing with the Bible and different aspects of spiritual life, as well as accounts of missionary outreach, primarily Lutheran but also Anglican in Kunama and Hamasen, Ethiopia, Sudan, Uganda, Madagascar, India and parts of Asia, including surveys of non-Christian religious practices. Of particular historical interest is the entry "How the Light of the Gospel Entered and was Revealed in Hamasien" a joint narrative by the two pioneer "fathers" of Evangelical Christianity in Eritrea, Pastors Solomon Atsqu, and Zara Tseyon Muse, covering the vicissitudes, persecutions, flight to Emkullu and other trials of the earliest adherents of evangelical Christianity in the Eritrean highlands, including interesting glimpses into debates with monks of Debre Bizen. Also of great interest is an Amharic article by negadras Gebre Haywet Baykidan, once Menelik's interpreter, Amharic: አጤ ምኒልክና ኢትዮዽያ ("Atse Menelik and Ethiopia") on pages 336–55. It is an incisive and constructive critique with proposals, in ten points for the reform of finances, taxes, education, traditional law and military training. Berhan Yekun contributed very much to the development of the Tigrinya language.
