= Omhajer subregion =

Coordinates: 14.3252°N 36.6550°E

Omhajer ኦምሓጀር
- Subregion
- Omhajer
- Nickname: ኦምሓጀር

- Location within Eritrea
- Country: Eritrea
- Region: Gash Barka
- Capital: Omhajar
- Time zone: GMT +3

Om Hajar subregion ({{ኦምሓጀር }}) is a subregion in the western Gash-Barka region (Zoba Gash-Barka) of Eritrea. Its capital lies at Omhajer(ኦምሓጀር). The area has a patented history with the Italians and the struggle between the Eritreans and Ethiopians.

== Overview ==
Gash-Setit and Om Hajar District is often referred to as "the breadbasket of Eritrea" because the area is agriculturally rich and more fertile than most of Eritrea. Crops such as sorghum, millet, legumes, cotton and sesame are produced in the area. The high agricultural potential of the area was recognized by the Italians during the occupation and in 1928 they established the Ali Ghider cotton plantation in the area which provided cotton for the Barattolo Textile Factory in Asmara. Citrus fruits and bananas were also produced in the Gash-Setit but many of the plantations were destroyed during the Eritrean War of Independence in the 1960s or by the Ethiopian army during the 2000 conflict.

Here's some information about the history of Omhajer, a town in Eritrea:

Agricultural history

The Omhajer Subregion, which includes Omhajer, is known as "the breadbasket of Eritrea" because of its fertile soil and high agricultural potential. The Italians established a cotton plantation in the area in 1928, and the area also produced citrus fruits and bananas. However, many of the plantations were destroyed during the Eritrean War of Independence and the 2000 conflict with Ethiopia.

Tourism potential

Omhajer has a rich natural setting with the Setit River, which is covered in vegetation and is home to a number of wild animals, including elephants, antelopes, and crocodiles. The area has a growing number of visitors for trade and agricultural activities, and there are around 15 traditional hotels in the area.

Education

Omhajer has schools for all age groups, from kindergarten to secondary school.

Omhajer is a semi-urban center in the Gash-Barka region of Eritrea, located at the intersection of Sudan and Ethiopia.

== Towns and villages ==
- Arcugi
- Giamal Biscia
