= Molki subregion =

Molki
- Subregion
- Country: Eritrea
- Region: Gash-Barka
- Capital: Molki
- Time zone: UTC+3 (GMT +3)

Molki subregion is a subregion in the Gash-Barka region (Zoba Gash-Barka) of western Eritrea. Its capital lies at Molki.
