= Shambuko subregion =

Shambiko
- Subregion
- Interactive map of Shambiko
- Country: Eritrea
- Region: Gash-Barka
- Capital: Shambuko
- Time zone: UTC+3 (GMT +3)

Shambuko subregion is a subregion in the western Gash-Barka region (Zoba Gash-Barka) of Eritrea. Its capital lies at Shambuko.

== History ==
The town and district was overrun by Ethiopia during the Eritrean-Ethiopian War when the population fled.

== Towns and villages ==
- Badme
- Shambuko
