= Historic center of Sulmona =

Coordinates: 42.048°N 13.925°E

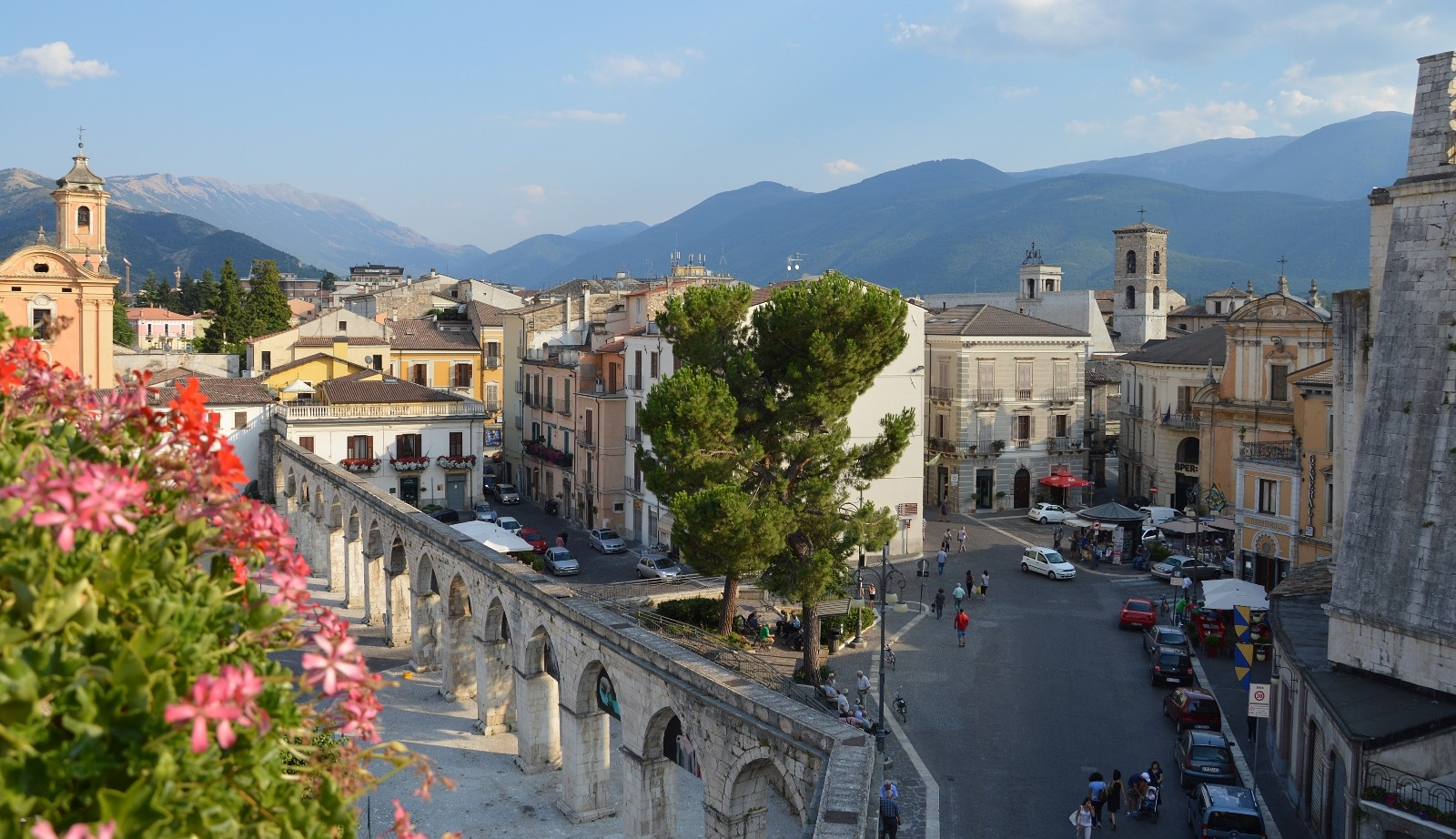
Historic Centre of Sulmona

Historic centre of Sulmona is one of the largest and best-preserved in Abruzzo and forms the city's main core, featuring a blend of medieval, Renaissance, and Baroque styles.

It is traversed from end to end by a main street known as Corso Ovidio, which opens onto the spacious Piazza Garibaldi, famous for the aqueduct of Manfred of Swabia. The city center is characterized by Sulmona’s Gothic style, evident in the churches of San Francesco della Scarpa and Santa Maria della Tomba, and above all in the church of the Santissima Annunziata complex and the façade of the Bishop's Palace. Beyond its numerous Renaissance and 18th-century palazzi, the center leads to the municipal park, where the Cathedral of San Panfilo stands.

== History ==
The city of Sulmona developed during the Roman era, beginning in the 1st century BC, acquiring a forum, a cardo and a decumanus (the main orthogonal streets), and public temples.

From the 11th century onwards, during the Middle Ages, Sulmona took on a new urban layout, accompanied by the construction of numerous churches. Among the oldest is the Cathedral of San Panfilo, erected outside the city walls. Although the churches originally featured a Romanesque style in the 12th century, earthquakes and subsequent renovations, such as the violent tremor of 1456 gave them their current Gothic appearance. This style was also fostered by the presence of the Angevin dynasty, as evidenced by the 13th-century portal of the "Rotonda" at the San Francesco della Scarpa complex.

== Bibliography ==
- Ezio Mattiocco, Sulmona, guida storico artistica della città e dintorni, Carsa Edizioni, Pescara, 2000, ISBN 978-88-85854-89-5.
- E. Mattiocco, G. Papponetti, Sulmona - Città d'arte e di poeti, Carsa Editrice, Pescara, 1997, ISBN 978-88-85854-41-3.
- M. Pacifico, Sulmona, Electra Editrice, 1985, ISBN 978-88-435-1257-7.
- Raffaele Giannantonio, Il palazzo Della SS. Annunziata in Sulmona, Carsa Edizioni, Pescara, 1997, ISBN 978-88-85854-76-5.
