= Paulos =

Paulos is a name which can serve as a given name and as a surname.

== People with the given name ==
- Paulos Faraj Rahho (1942–2008), Iraqi archbishop
- Paulos Gregorios, born Paul Varghese or Vargīsa Pôla (1922–1996), Malankara Orthodox Syrian Church bishop
- Paulos Mantovanis (1945–2011), Eastern Orthodox metropolitan bishop of Kyrenia, Cyprus
- Paulos Tesfagiorgis, Eritrean human rights activist
- Paulos Tzadua (1921–2003), Ethiopian Cardinal

== People with the surname ==
- Abune Paulos (1935–2012), Patriarch of the Ethiopian Orthodox Tewahedo Church
- Eric Paulos (born 1969), American computer scientist and roboticist
- John Allen Paulos (born 1945), American professor of mathematics
- Lucas Paulos (born 1998), Argentine rugby union player
- Nick Paulos (born 1992), Greek-American basketball player
- Shimun XX Paulos (1885–1920), Catholicos Patriarch of the Assyrian Church of the East

== See also ==
- Dairo Paulos, a village in Eritrea
