= Forto subregion =

Coordinates: 14.8810°N 38.8100°E

Forto
- Subregion
- Interactive map of Forto
- Country: Eritrea
- Region: Gash-Barka
- Capital: Forto
- Time zone: UTC+3 (GMT +3)

Forto subregion is a subregion in the Gash-Barka region of western Eritrea. Its capital is Forto.

== Towns and villages ==
- Algheden
