= Goluj subregion =

Golluj
- Subregion
- Country: Eritrea
- Region: Gash-Barka
- Capital: Golluj
- Time zone: UTC+3 (GMT +3)

Goluj subregion is a subregion in the western Gash-Barka region (Zoba Gash-Barka) of Eritrea. It has its capital at Golluj.
