= Ad Casub =

Ad Casub أد كاسب
- Location in Eritrea
- Coordinates: 15°24′N 37°17′E
- Country: Eritrea
- Region: Gash-Barka
- District: Gogne District
- Elevation: 716 m (2,349 ft)

Ad Casub (Arabic: أد كاسب) is a village in western Eritrea. It is located in Gogne District in the Gash-Barka region.

Nearby towns and villages include Algheden (19.3 km or 10.4 nmi), Adal (15.6 km or 8.4 nmi), Kieru (20.7 km or 11.2 nmi), Markaughe (10.6 km or 5.7 nmi), Hambok (19.6 km or 10.6 nmi) and Antalla (16.5 km or 8.9 nmi).
