= Golluj =

ጎልጅ Galoj قلوج
- Town
- Interactive map of ጎልጅ Galoj قلوج
- Coordinates: 14°45′N 36°43′E
- Country: Eritrea
- Region: Gash-Barka
- District: Golluj

Government
  - Type: Republic

Area
  - Total: 3,250 km^{2} (1,250 sq mi)
- Elevation: 650 m (2,130 ft)

Population (2013)
  - Total: 100,000
  - Density: 3/km^{2} (7.8/sq mi)
- Time zone: UTC+3 (EAT)
  - Summer (DST): +3
- Climate: BSh

Golluj (Tigre/Tigrinya: ጎልጅ; Arabic: غلخ) is a town in southwestern Eritrea. Located in the Gash-Barka region, it serves as the capital of the Golluj district. Golluj has more arable land per-capita than any other place in Eritrea; therefore, most often it is referred to as the bread basket of Eritrea within the Gash-Barka region. It is very ethnically diverse with vibrant cultures living together in harmony. In addition, the Golluj sub-division consists of many small towns, such as Omahajer, Gergef, Tebeldiya and Gerset.
