= Giamal Biscia =

Giamal Biscia جمل بيشا
- Town
- Location in Eritrea
- Coordinates: 15°0′N 36°54′E
- Country: Eritrea
- Region: Gash-Barka
- Subregion: Omhajer

Giamal Biscia (Arabic: جمل بيشا) is a village in western Eritrea. It is located in the Omhajer subregion of the Gash-Barka region. It lies inside the Gash-Setit wildlife reserve 6 kilometres north-east of Arcugi.

As the name may suggest, the village was founded by the Italians during the occupation.
