= Forto =

Coordinates: 15.6954°N 36.9713°E

Forto فورتو
- Interactive map of Forto
- Country: Eritrea
- Region: Gash-Barka
- District: Forto
- Time zone: UTC+3 (EAT)

Forto (Arabic: فورتو) (Tigrinya: ፎርቶ ሳዋ)is a town in Eritrea. It is located in the Gash-Barka region and is the capital of Forto District.
