= Gogne subregion =

Gogne
- Subregion
- Interactive map of Gogne
- Country: Eritrea
- Region: Gash-Barka
- Capital: Gogne
- Time zone: UTC+3 (GMT +3)

Gogne subregion is a subregion in the western Gash-Barka region of Eritrea. Its capital lies at Gogne.

== Towns and villages ==
- Ad Casub
- Gogne
- Hambok
- Markaughe
