= Aula =

Aula may refer to:

- Avola, a city in Sicily (Àula in Sicilian)
- Aula, Eritrea, a village in western Eritrea
- Aula (river), a river of Hesse, Germany
- AULA, a Canadian standard for advanced ultra-light aeroplanes

== See also ==
- Aula regia, the great hall in an imperial or royal palace
- Aula Palatina, a Roman palace basilica in Trier, Germany
- Aula Al Ayoubi, Syrian painter and visual artist
- Aula-Vintri, a village in Estonia
