= Algheden, Forto =

Algheden الغدن
- Village
- Location in Eritrea
- Coordinates: 15°28′N 37°7′E
- Country: Eritrea
- Region: Gash-Barka
- District: Forto
- Elevation: 861 m (2,825 ft)

Algheden (Arabic: الغدن) is a village in western Eritrea. It is located in Forto District.

Nearby towns and villages include Bitama (32.6 km or 17.6 nmi), Hawashayt (30.4 km or 16.4 nmi), Adal (5.7 km or 3.1 nmi), Ad Casub (19.3 km or 10.4 nmi), Elit (28.7 km or 15.5 nmi) and Antalla (24.6 km or 13.3 nmi).
