= Mogolo subregion =

Mogolo
- Subregion
- Interactive map of Mogolo
- Country: Eritrea
- Region: Gash-Barka
- Capital: Mogolo
- Time zone: UTC+3 (GMT +3)

Mogolo subregion is a subregion in the Gash-Barka region of western Eritrea. Its capital lies at Mogolo.

== Towns and villages ==
- Aredda
- Attai
- Chibabo
- Mescul
- Mogolo
