= Meka'ika =

Meka'ika ሜካኢካ
- Unincorporated Community
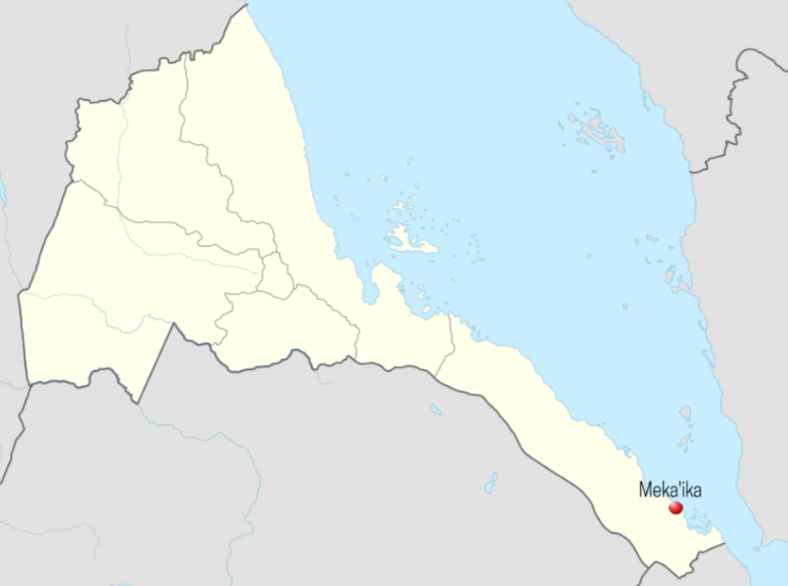
- Location of Meka'ika, Eritrea
- Coordinates: 13°03′26″N 42°40′01″E
- Country: Eritrea
- Region: Southern Red Sea
- District: Southern Denkalya
- Elevation: 6 m (20 ft)

Meka'ika (Tigrinya: ሜካኢካ) is a small coastal town in the Southern Denkalya subregion, Southern Red Sea region in Eritrea.

Meka'ika is located on the Massawa–Assab highway (P-6), immediately south of the Assab International Airport and approximately 10 km (6.2 mi) north-west of Assab and 476 km (296 mi) south-east of Asmara, the country's capital. The town borders the Red Sea, with the islands of Fatma and Halib close by.
