= Shambuko =

Shambuko شامبيكو
- Location in Eritrea
- Coordinates: 14°55′09″N 37°50′08″E
- Country: Eritrea
- Region: Gash-Barka
- District: Shambuko District
- Climate: BSh

Shambuko (Arabic: شامبيكو, Tigrinya: ሻምቡቆ Tigrinya pronunciation: [ʃambukʼo]) is a small town in southern Eritrea. Located in the Gash-Barka Region of Eritrea, the town was overrun by the Ethiopian military during the Eritrean-Ethiopian War when the population fled from there.
