= Algheden, Dghe =

Alghadein القدين
- Village
- Location in Eritrea
- Coordinates: 15°32′N 37°45′E
- Country: Eritrea
- Region: Gash-Barka
- District: Dghe

Alghadein (Arabic: القدين) is a village in western Eritrea. It is located in Dghe subregion.
