= Molki =

Molki ملكي
- Town
- Interactive map of Molki
- Coordinates: 14°53′08″N 38°14′00″E
- Country: Eritrea
- Region: Gash-Barka
- District: Molki
- Time zone: UTC+3 (EAT)

Molki (Arabic: ملكي) is a town in Eritrea. It is located in the Gash-Barka region and is the capital of the Molki district.
