= Dghe subregion =

Dghe
- Subregion
- Interactive map of Dghe
- Country: Eritrea
- Region: Gash-Barka
- Capital: Dghe
- Time zone: UTC+3 (GMT +3)

Dghe subregion is a subregion in the western Gash-Barka region (Zoba Gash-Barka) of Eritrea. Its capital lies at Dghe.
