= Haykota subregion =

Coordinates: 15.1863°N 37.0774°E

Haykota
- Subregion
- Interactive map of Haykota
- Country: Eritrea
- Region: Gash-Barka
- Capital: Haykota
- Time zone: UTC+3 (GMT +3)

Haykota subregion is a subregion in the western Gash-Barka region (Zoba Gash-Barka) of Eritrea. Its capital lies at Haykota.

== Towns and villages ==
- Antalla
- Bitama
- Elit
- Haykota
