= Omhajer =

Omhajer ኦምሓጀር
- Town
- Location in Eritrea
- Coordinates: 14°19′29″N 36°39′19″E
- Country: Eritrea
- Region: Gash Barka
- Subregion: Omhajer

Government
  - Type: EPLF
  - Ahmed falul: Tesfealem mahari

Population
  - Total: 9,000−10,000

Omhajer (Tigrinya: ኦምሓጀር) is a town in Eritrea. It is the center of the Omhajer subregion in the western Gash-Barka region (Zoba Gash-Barka) of Eritrea. The area has a patented history with the Italians and the struggle between the Eritreans and Ethiopians.
