= Aredda =

Aredda أردا
- Town
- Location in Eritrea
- Coordinates: 15°16′N 37°36′E
- Country: Eritrea
- Region: Gash-Barka
- Subregion: Mogolo
- Elevation: 664 m (2,178 ft)

Aredda (Arabic: أردا) is a village in western Eritrea.

== Location ==
The town is located in the subregion of the Gash-Barka region. It is situated 5.1 miles from Attai.
