= Aligider =

ዓሊግድር ዓሊ ግድር Ali Ghider, Ali-Guider, Alighedir
- Ali Ghider
- Location in Eritrea
- Coordinates: 15°07′N 36°29′E
- Country: Eritrea
- Region: ጋሽ-ባርካ
- District: ተሰነይ District
- Area code: 291

Ali Ghider (Arabic: علي قدر) is located nine kilometers to the west of Teseney in the country of Eritrea. It is part of the Teseney sub-zone and has a diverse population. It is considered the last settlement in Eritrea before reaching the Sudanese Border and is located in the lowlands.

Agriculture, livestock raising, and trade are vital to the area's economy. Ali Ghider has access to potable water from both the Gash River and underground water resources. The irrigation process has created an artificial marsh near the Gash River, which provides a large habitat for many bird species.

Ali Ghider was once an Italian frontier village. Ali Ghider was an agricultural area that grew cotton and other crops, including sorghum, millet, and taff, and was managed by the Societa Impresse Africana (SIA). SIA helped develop Ali Ghider into a company town, housing tenant farmers and other workers on the plantation. A school and clinic were set up, and by the 1950s, the plantation employed 2,000 Eritreans and 15 Italians and "provided a residence for another 12,000 part-time workers and family members."

A well-known Italian business that was established for many years in Ali Ghider was the Barattolo cotton plantation, which was established in 1965 by Roberto Barattolo in a purchase from SIA. This acquisition from the SIA allowed Barattolo to export knitwear to Europe and the Middle East.

Ali Ghider received significant damage from the sacking by Ethiopian forces. Many of the Italian artifacts left from its time as a frontier village were destroyed in 2001 through Ethiopian military actions.
