= Libon (service) =

Voice and messaging application

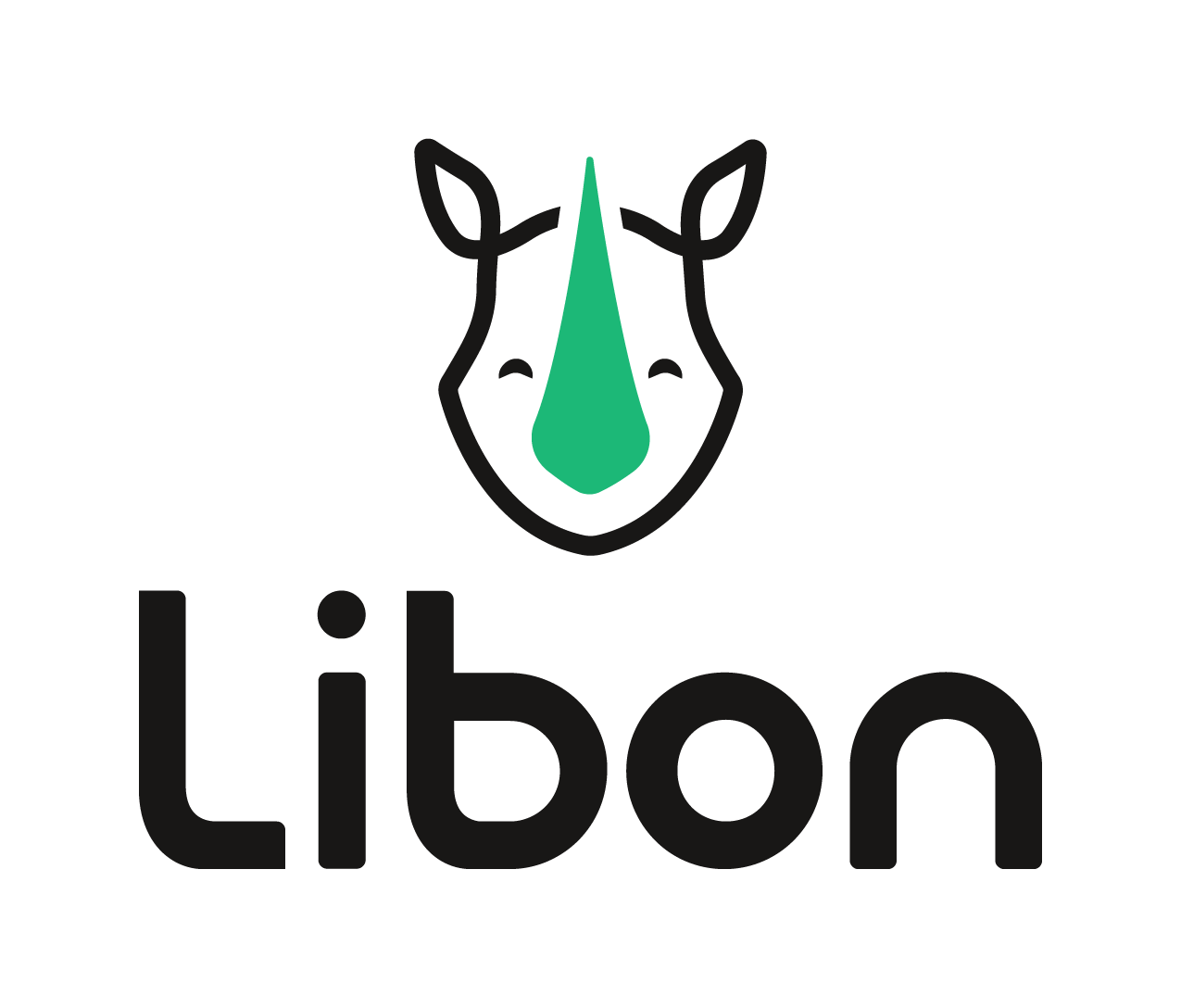
- Developer: Orange S.A.
- Release: 21 November 2012; 13 years ago

Stable release(s)
- Android: 4.55 / March 9, 2021; 5 years ago
- iOS: 4.45.1 / March 16, 2021; 5 years ago
- Operating system: iOS 9 or later and Android Lollipop or later
- Available in: 8 languages
- List of languages Arabic, English, French, Polish, Romanian, Russian, Slovak and Spanish
- Type: Voice over IP
- License: Proprietary commercial software
- Website: www.libon.com

Libon is a voice over IP application developed for iOS and Android by Orange S.A.’s subsidiary, Orange Vallée. The application is available for free on the App Store and Google Play in 90 countries, including in countries where Orange does not have a presence in the telecommunications industry, such as the United States.

== History ==
Libon was launched in beta for testing in November 2009 before the LeWeb conference. The first version of the app was called "ON Address Book", and was only available on Android. The current name is an abbreviation of the original name "Life is Better ON". All versions of the app have included "ON" or "Libon" in their names.

In March 2011, Orange launched "ON Voicefeed" at the DEMO conference, a visual voicemail iOS app enabling its users to personalize their voicemail greetings by recording them or typing them.

On 21 November 2012, Orange added a VoIP feature, updated the app's user interface and officially rebranded the app to "Libon". The app could be used by any iPhone user for free, although features like voicemail transcripts and email copies were charged for in a freemium model. The Android version was released in the first quarter of 2013. The new service was announced by Stéphane Richard at Orange's "Show Hello!" conference.

In March 2015, the "Reach Me" feature was added to the app, allowing calls to be received over Wi-Fi, a competitor to the Wi-Fi calling feature utilised by other carriers. On 30 June 2016, Orange removed features that did not focus on the VoIP Out functionality.

== Reception ==
CNET gave the application a positive review, praising its unlimited free calls to other users of the app and call quality, although they derided its subscription service.

According to Orange, the app had "tens of thousands" of active users in 2011, who used the app seven times per day on average.
