= Gogne =

Gogne قوني
- Town
- Location in Eritrea
- Coordinates: 15°5′6″N 37°24′7″E
- Country: Eritrea
- Region: Gash-Barka
- District: Gogne

Gogne (Arabic: قوني) is a town in western Eritrea. It is the capital of the Gogne district in the Gash-Barka region.
