= Logo Anseba =

Capital of Logo Anseba subregion, Eritrea

Logo Anseba is the capital of Logo Anseba subregion.
