= Dairo Paulos =

Coordinates: 15°16′41″N 38°52′11″E

Dairo Paulos (Arabic: دايرو باولس, alternatively Da'iro P'awlos or Dahro Caulos) is a village on the outskirts of Asmara, Eritrea. The name means "Fig of Paul" and is reported to refer to a characteristic tree of the area and a founder of the village. There is a small reservoir near the town.
