= Teseney =

Teseney تسني ተሰነይ
- City
- Location in Eritrea
- Coordinates: 15°06′36″N 36°39′27″E
- Country: Eritrea
- Region: Gash-Barka
- District: Teseney
- Elevation: 919 m (3,015 ft)

Population (2012)
  - City: 4,815
  - Metro: 65,000
- Climate: BWh

Teseney (Arabic: تسني, Tigrinya: ተሰነይ), also spelled Tessenei or Tesseney, is a market town in western Eritrea. It lies south-east of Kassala in Sudan, on the Gash River. The city was much fought over in the Eritrean War of Independence during which much of it was destroyed. After the war, Tessenei has become a governmental administrative center with customs and agricultural offices and a military base.

== Overview ==
Teseney is located 45 kilometers from the Sudanese border and approximately 115 kilometers beyond Barentu administrative or central administration of Gash Barka region. It is considered a frontier town on western Eritrea and many calls a land port because of its location and movements of people and goods from Sudan to Eritrea and vice versa. The town is made up of people of various ethnic backgrounds and most used language is the Arabic language because of the border and most of the people get back home from Sudan (people who left Eritrea due to the War with Ethiopia for Independence). On the outskirts of Teseney to the north are a couple of hills from which there are exceptional views of the lowlands and mountains in Sudan. Also, farmers have been reporting of lions roaring in south of Teseney. In summer 2006, a young male lion was sighted and photographed, but since then, there has been no sighting and farmers do still report lions roars being echoed in the night. Monkeys and spotted hyenas form also part of Tessenei fauna, while acacia and Hyphaene thebaica palm locally known as Dom trees dominate its flora.

The name Tessenei with the diminutive of Seney (seni means nice/good in Tigre Eritrean language) or Teseney, which means “let it be nice to dwell”. It is also called Sabbot by its native local inhabitants. In 1929, it was called by the Italian colonizers the Village of Gasperini (named after the former colonial governor of Eritrea, a native of Treviso in Italy).

Tessenei, is divided into several "Hillas" or districts / quarters, inhabited by different ethnic groups. There is in fact the Hillat Takarin which accommodates the ethnic group Takrour (originally emigrated Hausa and other clans from Nigeria hundreds of years ago), the Hillat Sudan (refers to the Sudanese community in the town) Hillat Halabit (inhabited by Beni Amer pastoralists); Hillat Somal (inhabited by Somalis, in the trading centre), built around a hill of granite blocks, just over 100 meter high, which separates it from the Hillat Takarin. There is small river that flows into the Gash: The stream Tadalay. Behind the hill runs an irrigation canal that takes water from the Gash, called Tur-a, (Arabic word for canal) and carries the waters from the stream to the lands cultivated with cotton (Ali Ghidir AgroIndustry), next/around to the village Ali Ghidir. The water supply is solved, thanks to a reservoir fed by a very old group of pumps (from the early 1930s) that draw water from the sands of the Gash. It is a huge deep basin, built on top on the small hill of granite, surrounded by old baobab trees. At the side of this large basin-tank, there was the Italian Civil Hospital, built in the 1920s, which for many years, has served the whole area near Tesseney, as far as the villages of Haikota, Gallug, Ali-Ghider, Talatahasher, Sabderat (villages bordering the Sudan), Sittimò, Aad Elit (village populated by about 1,000 individuals who speak a language all their own.

== History ==
During the colonial period both Tessenei and the neighbouring village of Ali Ghider ( also written as Ali Gidir or Aligidir) were the center of a vast agricultural development project using the enormous quantity of waters of the Gash river. The project dates back to 1905 when its first feasibility studies was forwarded by an Italian engineer called Nicola Coles. Works started in 1924 and included: a small dam and a tiny lake to store water (inaugurated in 1928 ) and numerous other works and a net of water irrigation canals to irrigate an approximately 10,000 hectares of land. An Italian agricultural-industrial company SIA, "Società Imprese Africane" (Company on African Enterprises), won this major concession. Later a consortium of which "Cotonificio Barattolo", with its seat in Asmara became the main shareholder. The main crop was cotton, a variety of Sakellaridis, the same as cultivated in Egypt and the entire production was exported to Italy where it enjoys customs facilities. A plant for the treatment of cotton, a large mill for the processing of seeds, a power plant and a workshop complete the work, along with a modern factory for spinning and weaving cotton was built in Tessenei. During the Anglo-Egyptian condominium a narrow gauge line of railway was built connecting Tessnei with Kassala in Sudan via Malwaya conjunction. This line has almost vanished since the early 1960s.

The Village of Ali Ghider was chosen as a field camp for the project. A big workshop and store for agricultural machinery and farm equipment was built, with four leading Italian directors in charge of its administration and field engineering; all living there. A very strange system for using the land and supervising the plantation was running, by the so-called blatas (a blata is Eritrean/Ethiopian aristocratic title equivalent to counselor). These blatas were brought to the area with their family ties and kin from places as far as Keren in central Eritrea. Blata Yassin, Blata Geme Almaday, Blata Jabir, Blata Melakin and Haj Gladios were the prominent blatas. Hedareb (mainly Bet-Juk, Beni Amr, Maria and Sebdarat) tribes and 1500 ex-fighters and their families farm cotton, sesame and sorghum in Ali Ghider.

American Peace Corps in the 1960s had contributed to the education field in Tessenei by sending volunteer teachers. There was also an American evangelical medical clinic in the Centre of the city.

The events of the war that led to the independence of Eritrea caused the destruction of these colonial developmental works. Tessenei still contains few Italian relics.

During the Eritrean War of Independence (1961–1991), Tessenei was repeatedly bombed, and was subject to severe fighting because of its proximity to the borders of Sudan, from which the Eritrean insurgents receive weapons and supplies, but it was also the first to be liberated in 1988, having suffered extensive damage. Outside Teseney, just beyond Haykota, is a monument to Hamid Idris Awate, who fired the first shots in the Eritrean liberation struggle in September 1961.

== Economy ==
The town is a busy marketplace with nomadic traders, merchants and returnees from the Sudan. The main square in front of the mosque features many different trades, with tailors, cafés, bars and other shops. There is a busy exchange market where the Saudi Riyal and the Sudanese pound are exchanged to Eritrean Nakfas, and the food in the souk area has a distinctly Sudanese flavor. Teseney is one of the reception points for returnees from the refugee camps in the Sudan who then proceed to other locations.

During the rainy season (July to September) most areas around Teseney are impassable, but the recently constructed asphalt road from Barentu to Tesenei guarantees a comfortable trip by road to this border village. Daily buses leave to Kassala in Sudan, Barentu and Asmara, the Eritrean capital.

== See also ==
- Railway stations in Eritrea
