= Kunama people =

Nilotic ethnic group native to Eritrea and Ethiopia

Kunama
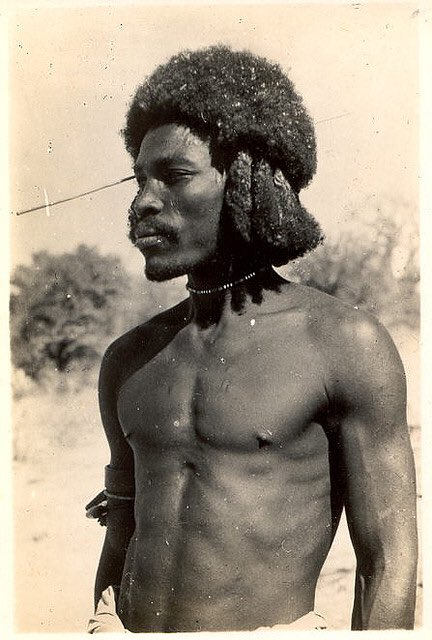

Total population
- 260,000

Regions with significant populations
- Eritrea: 254,600
- Ethiopia: 5,400 (2007)

Languages
- Kunama

Religion
- Islam and Christianity (Roman Catholic and P'ent'ay)

Related ethnic groups
- Nara

The Kunama are an ethnic group native to Eritrea and northern Ethiopia. They are one of the smallest ethnic communities in Eritrea, constituting only 4% of the population. Most of the estimated 260,000 Kunama live in the remote and isolated area between the Gash and Setit rivers near the border with Ethiopia. The Kunama people have ancient ancestry in the land of Eritrea. In the 2007 Ethiopian census, however, the number of Kunama in Tigray dropped to 2,976, as the remaining 2,000 or so members of this ethnic group had migrated into the other regions of Ethiopia.

== History ==
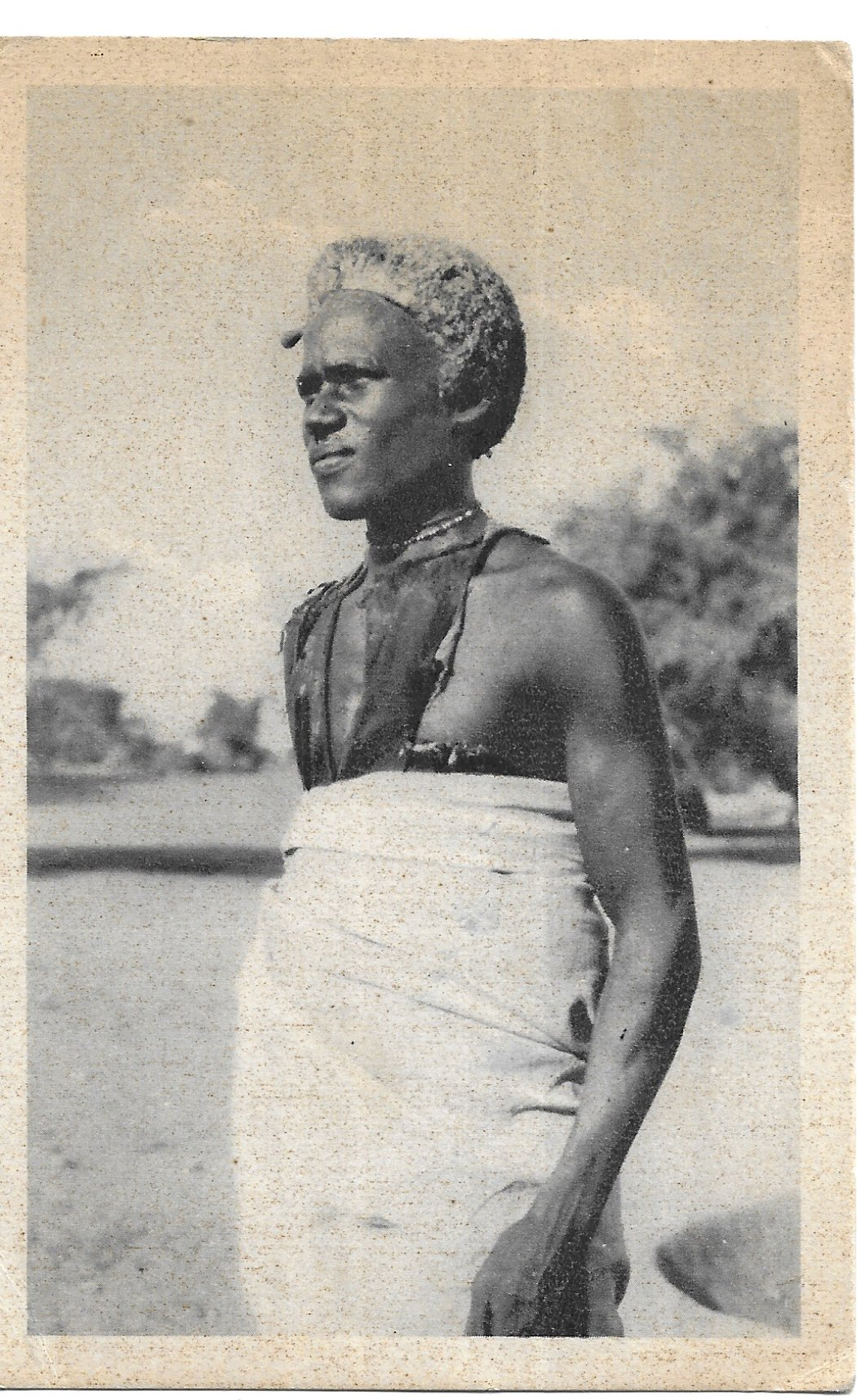
Young Kunama man

The earliest written mention of the Kunama comes from Ya'qubi, writing around 872 AD. His account is based on travelers' reports. He noted the 'Cunama' tribe living on the eastern borders of Alodia. They were later mentioned by the 10th century Arab geographer Ibn Hawqal. He states they lived in the Barka valley, and fought with bows, poisoned arrows and spears, but did not use shields. He also mentions that the Kunama worship a god called Anna, and were ruled by a community of elders.

The Kunama were victims of frequent slave raids, the Kunama called these raids sakada masa or baada. In 1692, the Ethiopian Emperor Iyasu I undertook an expedition in the Mareb river valley, against the "Shanqella of the Dubani" (the Kunama), in present-day Gash Barka. At the sound of the musket fire, the tribesmen were terrified and fled, but were pursued by Iyasu's men who massacred them and sacked their towns. In local oral traditions, the Abyssinians of Wolkait, Adiyabo and Seraye are still remembered for their devastating raids against the Kunama to obtain slaves, grain and loot. Among the most violent raids ever recorded in the region was conducted by the Tigrayan warlord Ras Alula of Ethiopia, who in 1886, killed off two-thirds of the Kunama and Nara populations living north of the Mareb River. Italian colonialism in the 1890s put an end to the raids.

During the Eritrean War of Independence, the Kunama were the only tribe in Eritrea to have consistently supported Ethiopian rule. In the 1940s they were raided by Hamid Idris Awate and many of their villages were destroyed, another raid by the ELF in 1962 forced many Kunama to flee towards Tigray province. In 1977 the Kunama raised a militia to fight alongside the Ethiopians against the Eritrean separatists. As a result, whenever the Ethiopian soldiers went through the Gash Barka region, they would burn down the villages belonging to the Tigre and Nara but leave the Kunama villages alone. In the 1980s, the EPLF sought to gain Kunama support through village self organization programs, social services and education. By the end of the decade some Kunama had begun participating in the EPLF.

The Ethiopian-Eritrean War (1998–2000) forced some 4,000 Kunama to flee their homes to Ethiopia as the most intense parts of the conflict took place in their own homeland.

== Demographics ==
The Kunama speak the Kunama language. It is conventionally classified as part of the Nilo-Saharan family, which also includes the nearby Nara language although they are not closely related. Although some Kunama still practice traditional beliefs, most have adopted Islam or Christianity.

The fertile plains of the Gash-Setit, also known as the Gash-Barka region, where the Kunama live are sometimes referred to as the "breadbasket of Eritrea". Formerly nomadic, today they are farmers and pastoralists. Historically, the Kunama have been dominated by other ethnic groups and they are often forced from their traditional lands. The official policy of the Government of Eritrea is that all land is state property and the Government encourages large commercial farms.

The Kunamas are settled agriculturalists and pastoralists living mainly from cattle. They are matriarchal with a prominent role played by women. According to their social system, a child is a member of Kunama society only if his or her mother is Kunama, and relatives are only recognized on the mother's side. The Kunamas are both linguistically and culturally closely related to the Nara people of Eritrea.

== Culture ==
Many of the Kunama were traditionally hunters and gatherers. They also engaged in hoe-farming. However, some Kunama took up pastoralism as agricultural land became scarce. Contemporary Kunama are mainly sedentary agriculturists and pastoralists who raise cattle.

The Kunama are a matrilineal clan-based society, where some of the most notable clans include the Alaka, Lakka, Serma, Kara, and Nataka.

The majority of the Kunama are adherents of Islam, with a minority that practices the Roman Catholicism. The Kunama converted to Christianity and Islam in the late 19th and early 20th centuries.

== Media ==
The award-winning documentary film Home Across Lands follows a group of Kunama refugees resettled in the United States and their attempts to adapt to life in their new home.
