= Angevin =

Angevin or House of Anjou may refer to:

- County of Anjou or Duchy of Anjou, a historical county, and later Duchy, in France
  - Angevin (language), the traditional langue d'oïl spoken in Anjou
  - Counts and Dukes of Anjou
- House of Ingelger, a Frankish noble family who were counts of Anjou between the 10th and 12th centuries, their female-line descendants (through Ermengarde, Duchess of Burgundy) made up the Angevin Plantagenets
- Angevin kings of England (Plantagenet), members of the House of Anjou who occupied the English throne in the 12th and early 13th centuries, their female-line descendants (through Eleanor of England, Queen of Castile) made up the Capetian Angevins
  - Angevin Empire, the assemblage of territories in Britain and France ruled by the Angevin kings of England
- Angevin kings of Jerusalem, members of the House of Anjou who occupied the throne of the Kingdom of Jerusalem in the 12th century, relatives of the Angevin kings of England
- Capetian House of Anjou, a cadet branch of the Capetian dynasty of France, members of which became kings of Sicily, Naples, Hungary and Poland from the 13th to the 15th century
- House of Valois-Anjou, a cadet branch of the French house of Valois and female-line descendants of the previous house, which ruled Naples and held territories such as Anjou, Maine, Piedmont and Provence in the 14th and 15th centuries
- House of Bourbon-Anjou, a cadet branch of the House of Bourbon, descendants of Philip V of Spain, including the current Spanish royal family.
