= Aula, Eritrea =

Coordinates: 15°12′N 37°43′E

Aula (Arabic: أولا) is a settlement in the Gash-Barka region of Eritrea.
