= Barentu, Eritrea =

Barentu ባረንቱ
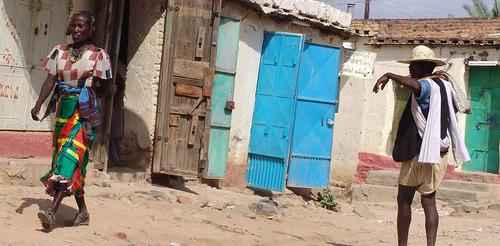

- Location within Eritrea
- Coordinates: 15°07′00″N 37°36′00″E
- Country: Eritrea
- Region: Gash-Barka
- Subregion: Barentu

Population (2001)
- 21,460
- Time zone: UTC+3 (EAT)
- Climate: BSh

Barentu (Tigrinya: ባረንቱ) is a town in southwestern Eritrea, lying south of Agordat, and is the capital of Gash-Barka Region. The town population comprises various tribes, Kunama, Nara, Tigre and Tigrinya being the most dominant.

== History ==
The town of Barentu was founded by the Italians in the 1890s to serve as the administrative center of the region. After the Ethiopian annexation, Barentu became the capital of the Gash-Setit province, a historical and administrative region in western Eritrea, named after the Gash and Setit (Tekezé) rivers.

The town has typically been a center of mining and agricultural activities for the area. During the Eritrean War of Independence the town was besieged. In 2000, during the Eritrean-Ethiopian War, the then flourishing town suffered extensive damage as it was plundered by the Ethiopian Army. Since the end of the war, the town has expanded rapidly in the last decade. This rapid expansion is also partly attributed to the Eritrean returnees from Sudan who established their home in the town after years of migration spent in Sudan.

== Geography ==
=== Overview ===
Barentu is the administrative center of Barentu subregion; has basic electricity services, a hospital and a clinic. The town consists of 3 administrative quarters or zobas (as they are called in tigrigna) namely zoba Fthi [ፍትሒ], Selam [ሰላም] and Biara [ቢያራ].

Nearby towns and villages include Tauda (14.8 km or 8.0 nmi), Alegada (12.8 km or 6.9 nmi), Dedda (13.3 km or 7.2 nmi), Augana (5.9 km or 3.2 nmi), Cona (10.6 km or 5.7 nmi) and Daghilo (14.4 km or 7.8 nmi), Mogolo, Kofa Arenku, Arada Tarkina and Lemesa.

=== Climate ===
Its climate is hot semi-arid (Köppen: BSh), warm during summer and cold during winter. Its climate is favorable for different types of crops, fruits, vegetables and a large variety of animals flourish in the region.

== Economy ==
It is one of the fastest-growing cities in the country. It acts as a hub for the surrounding agricultural areas, as a center for trade and exchange of commodities owing to its location in the center of the Gash Barka region.

The town is growing fast and has been able to provide basic services, such transport, education, health and faculties. The town gets very active on the weekly market days which host farmers, traders and livestock herders who all come to the town on Thursday and Saturday from surrounding villages to sell their produce and in return purchase commodities and goods to take back home. Products which come from the villages include crops such as sorghum, millet and sesame. Live stocks such as cows, camels, sheep and goats fill the market.

== Culture ==
Barentu is inhabited by the Kunama and the Nara peoples. Religiously, the city has adherents of the Eritrean Orthodox Tewahedo Church, the Roman Catholic Church, and Islam, as well as practitioners of the indigenous Kunama and Nara traditional beliefs.

Traditional Kunama religion is monotheistic, with worship of the goddess Anna. The name Anna appears in many phrases of the Kunama language, such as "Annam koske" ("God exists, sees and judges"), "Anna laga" (lit. "God’s world", i.e., "the universe belongs to God"), and "Anna hedabu" ("God willing").

== Education ==
Education is supplied by a number of elementary and junior high schools, and one high school. Schools teach in Kunama, Nara, Modern Standard Arabic, Tigrinya, and English.

== Transport ==
Transport wise Barentu is a hub that connects different parts of the country and it has asphalt roads connecting it with Asmara, Keren, Tessenei, Haikota and Agordat, dirt roads connect with smaller towns like Tokombia, and Shambuqo. Due to its location the town is busy with travellers from all over the region. Locally transport is supplied with taxis and buses which connect different parts of the town, but it seems the locals prefer to walk.
