= Haykota =

Haykota هاكوتا
- Town
- Location in Eritrea
- Coordinates: 15°10′54″N 37°04′29″E
- Country: Eritrea
- Region: Gash-Barka
- District: Haykota
- Climate: BSh

Haykota (Arabic: هاكوتا) is a small town in the western Gash-Barka region of Eritrea. The town is the capital of the Haykota subregion.

== Overview ==
The town is situated near the location of a monument erected to memorialize Hamid Idris Awate, the man who started the Eritrean War of Independence.

== Economy ==
A dairy co-op in the town plays a significant part in the local economy.
