= Gash-Barka region =

Administrative region of Eritrea

Gash-Barka region ዞባ ጋሽ ባርካ (Tigrinya) إقليم قاش بركة (Arabic)
- Zoba
- Gash-Barka Region in Eritrea
- Coordinates: 15°15′N 37°30′E
- Country: Eritrea
- Capital: Barentu

Government
  - Administrator: Musa Raba

Area
  - Total: 33,200 km^{2} (12,800 sq mi)

Population
  - Total: 1,103,742
  - Density: 33.2/km^{2} (86.1/sq mi)
- ISO 3166 code: ER-GB
- HDI (2022): 0.370 low · 6th

Gash-Barka (Tigrinya: ጋሽ-ባርካ, Arabic: إقليم قاش بركة) is an administrative region of Eritrea. It is situated in the south-west of the country, bordering the Anseba region to the north, and the Maekel (Central) and Debub (Southern) regions to the east; the country of Sudan lies to the west and Ethiopia to the south.

The capital of Gash-Barka is Barentu. Other towns include Agordat (the former capital), Molki, Sebderat and Teseney. As of 2005, the region had a population of 708,800 compared to a population of 625,100 in 2001. The net growth rate was 11.81 per cent. The total area of the province was 33,200 km^{2} and the density was 21.35 persons per km^{2}., making up roughly one-third of Eritrea. The region is dubbed as the "breadbasket" of the country as it is rich in agriculture. The region is also rich in marble, and other important minerals, including gold. In Ougaro, there are some old mineshafts and machinery from the days when the Italians mined gold there.

== Geography ==
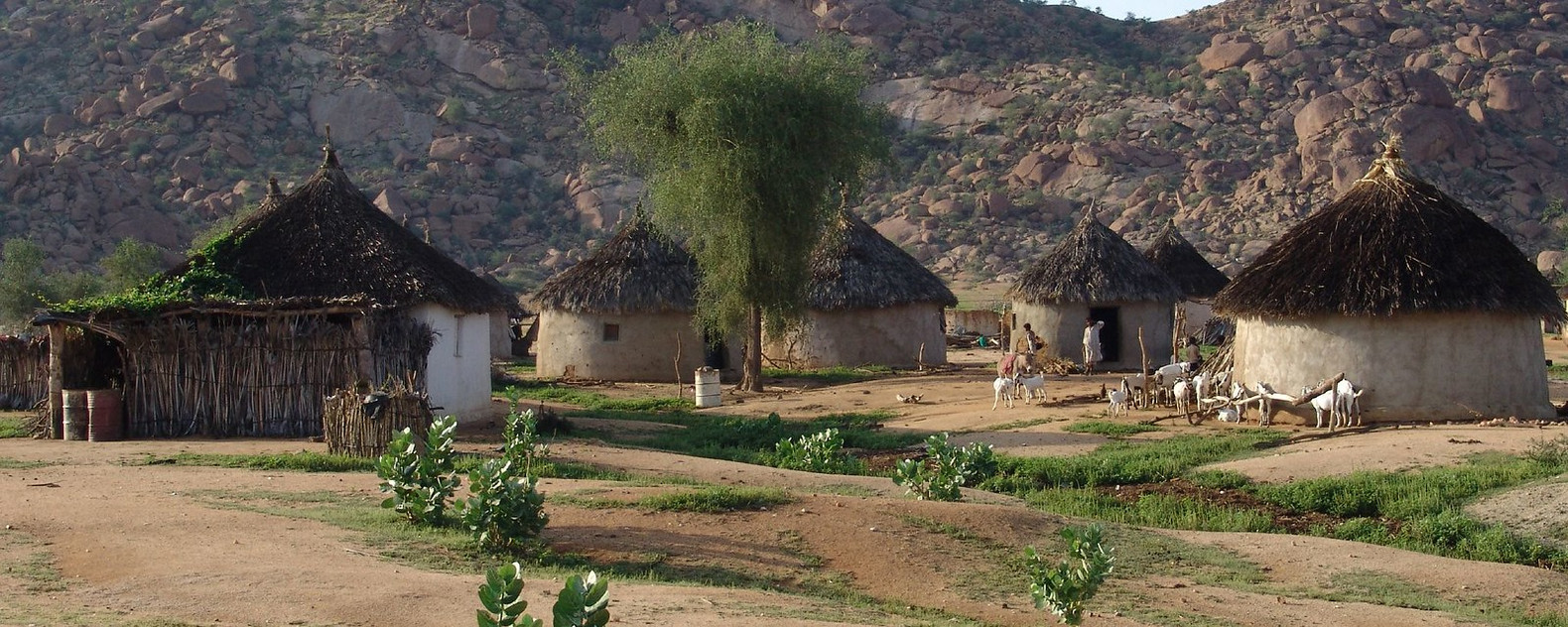
Early morning in a Gash Barka village

It is situated in the south-west of the country, bordering the Anseba region to the north, and the Maekel (Central) and Debub (Southern) regions to the east; the country of Sudan lies to the west and Ethiopia to the south. The major crops in the region are bananas, tomatoes, cotton, onions, millet, sesame, green pepper and sweet melon. Within the entire country there existed extensive forestation as recently as 1900 AD; however, there is less than one percent forested area present in the country, and this deforestation trend has been mirrored in the region. Most of Eritrea was previously habitat for the endangered painted hunting dog, Lycaon pictus; however, this canid is now deemed extirpated from Gash-Barka and all of Eritrea due to the expanding human population in this country. The topography of the region has highland plateau, which are cooler than the regions around the coastal plains. There are two rainy seasons, the heavier one during summer and the lighter one during spring. The climate and geography of the region along with other regions of Eritrea is similar to the one of Ethiopia. The average elevation in the region is around 1,800 m (5,900 ft) to 2,100 m (6,900 ft). The hottest month is May recording temperatures up to 30 °C (86 °F), while the coldest month is December to February when it reaches freezing temperature. The region received around 508 mm (20.0 in) of rainfall and the soil is conducive for agriculture.

== Demographics ==
As of 2005, the region had a population of 708,800 compared to a population of 625,100 in 2001. The net growth rate was 11.81 per cent. The total area of the province was 33,200 km^{2} and the density was 21.35 persons per km^{2}. As of 2002, the Total Fertility Rate (TFR), defined as the children per woman was 5.1. The General Fertility Rate (GFR), defined as the births per 1,000 women between the ages of 15 and 45 remained at 168.0. The Crude Birth Rate (CBR), the number of births per 1,000 population, was 34.0. The percentage of women pregnant as of 2002 out of the total population was 10.2 per cent. The mean number of children ever born stood at 6.3. The Infant Mortality Rate (IMR), defined as the number of deaths of children for every 1,000 born was 66.0 while the Child Mortality Rate (CMR), defined as the number of child deaths for every 1,000 children 5 years of age was 61.0. The under-5 mortality rate stood at 123.0. The number of children with the prevalence of Acute Respiratory Infection (ARI) was 1039, fever was 1039, and Diarrhea was 1039. The number of women with the knowledge of AIDS was 1,500 and the number of people with no knowledge of the disease or its prevention was 0.0 per cent.

== Education and economy ==
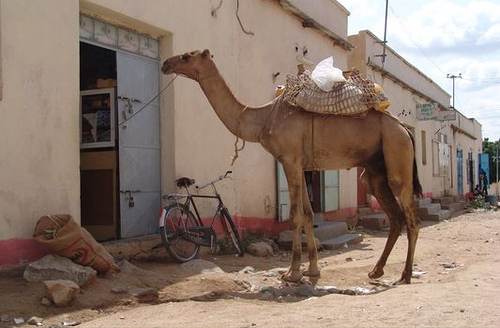
Barentu

As of 2002, the number of males completing or attending highest level of schooling in the region was 2,700 while it was 3,179 females. The per centage of literate males was 37.50 and the percentage of literate females was 22.00. A fraction of 61.70 males had no education, while the corresponding number for females was 74.20. The fraction of males completing secondary school stood at 0.80 and the fraction of males completing more than secondary was 001. The corresponding numbers for females was 0.40 and 000 respectively. As of 2002, the number of people engaged in Professional/technical/managerial activities was 4.00 per cent, Clerical was 2.70 per cent, Sales and services was 26.40 per cent, Skilled Manual was 14.00 per cent, Unskilled Manual was 0.80 per cent, Domestic Service was 8.90 per cent and Agriculture was 42.50 per cent. The total number of employed men was 2,150 and the total number of employed women was 2,012. The number of men who were paid their total earnings in cash was 59.10 per cent, in kind was 5.70 and in both was 22.90. The number of women who were paid their total earnings in cash was 81.90 per cent, in kind was 1.60 per cent and in both was 5.20 per cent.

== Administration ==
The region also includes the following districts: Agordat City, Barentu City, Dghe, Forto, Gogne, Haykota, Logo Anseba, Mensura, Mogolo, Molki, Omhajer (Guluj), Shambuko, Tesseney and Upper Gash. Eritrea has a one party national Assembly governed by People’s Front for Democracy and Justice (PFDJ) (originally Eritrean people's Liberation Front), an authoritarian government. From the time of independence since 24 May 1991, the country has been continuing with a transitional government elected during the elections in April 1993. The scheduled elections in 2001 has been postponed indefinitely. The regional and local elections are conducted on a periodic basis on a restricted framework. All men and women of any ethnic or religious background are eligible to vote. No parties or groups other than PFDJ are allowed to contest and the elections are presided by representatives from PDFJ. Policy decisions should be centered around the party mandate and opposition and dissenters have been imprisoned.
