= Project 19 =

World War II United States air depot in Eritrea

- Gura, Eritrea
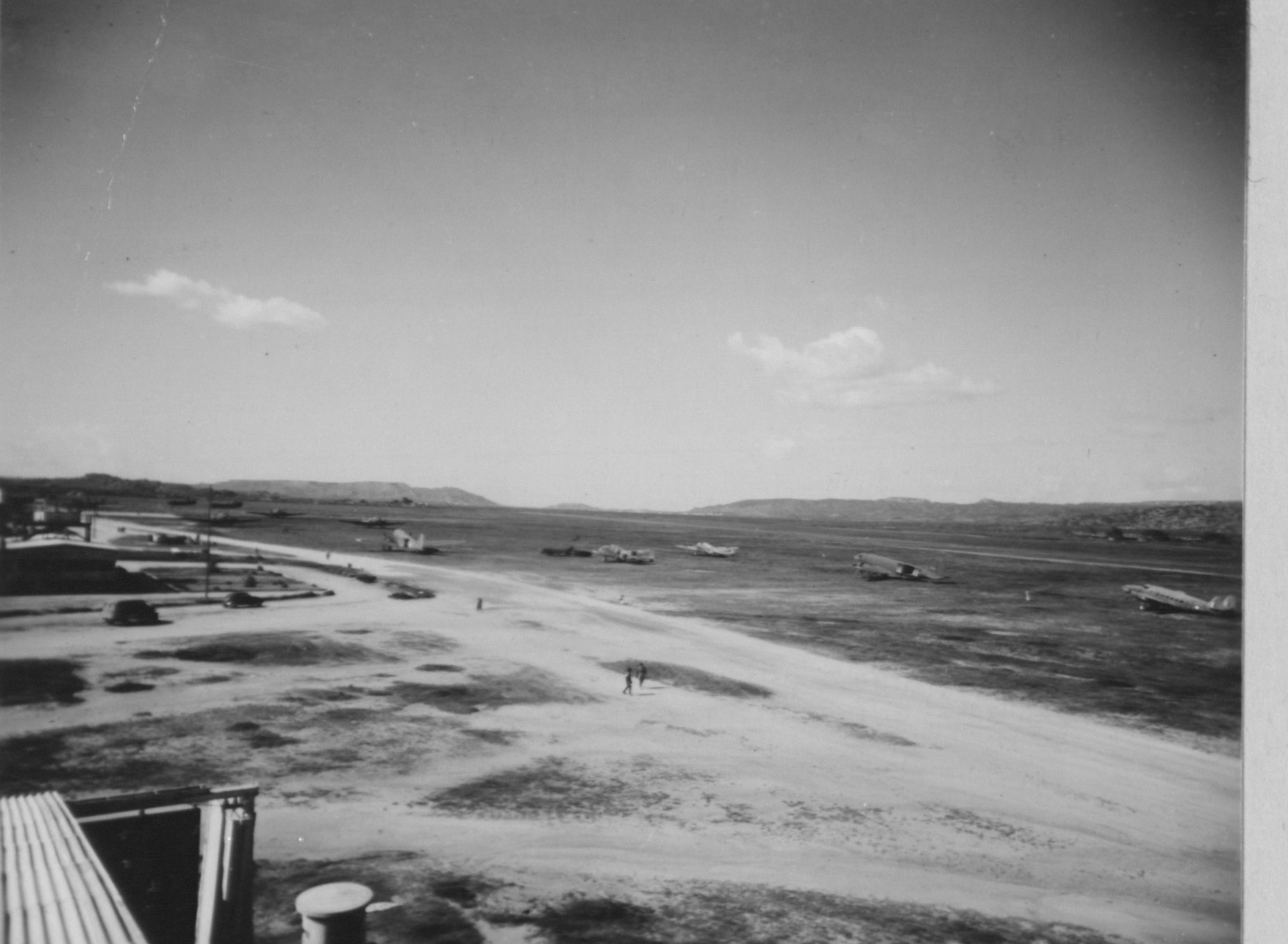
- The Gura airfield in 1943, with Douglas C-47s parked in dispersal areas

Site information
- Type: Aircraft repair and assembly depot
- Operator: Douglas Aircraft Company
- Controlled by: United States (under Lend-Lease)

Location
- Coordinates: 15.0133°N 39.0606°E

Site history
- Built by: Johnson, Drake & Piper
- In use: 1941–1943
- Battles/wars: World War II

Project 19 was the code name for a secret United States operation in Eritrea, begun before American entry into World War II and continued during the war. It executed aircraft repair and operated an assembly depot at Gura. It was staffed by American civilian workers sourced from the Douglas Aircraft Company and funded through the Lend-Lease program. Construction and logistics were handled by Johnson, Drake & Piper. At its peak the operation employed several thousand American civilians, who lived and worked at Gura for nearly two years far from any front.

Using civilian contractors rather than military personnel kept the operation consistent with American neutrality as the United States had yet to officially enter the war. The operation also included a second installation, a naval repair base at the Red Sea port of Massawa.

The depot repaired Royal Air Force and later United States Army Air Forces aircraft and returned them to the North African campaign from a base well behind the front lines. The operation was authorized at a secret War Department meeting on November 19, 1941, and wound down in 1943 as the fighting in North Africa ended. The American presence in Eritrea continued after the war through the communications site that became Kagnew Station.

== Background ==
Gura was originally an Italian air force base that had been built to support the invasion of Ethiopia. The depot reused an old Caproni aircraft-assembly plant and airfield, located inland from the Red Sea port of Massawa.

The depot grew out of a British request in the summer of 1941 to overhaul American-built engines and aircraft then in use in the Middle East. American planners became interested in Eritrea after it fell under British military occupation as liberated enemy territory in early 1941.

Eritrea was far enough from the Libya–Egypt combat zone to be safe from ground attack and beyond the range of Axis bombers, yet close enough that damaged aircraft could be sent down the Red Sea to the depot, repaired, and returned with little delay. Massawa offered one of the best natural harbors on the Red Sea, near enough to Alexandria to support the British Mediterranean Fleet but beyond the reach of Rommel's short-range bombers.

Project 19 accordingly took shape as two installations funded under Lend-Lease: the aircraft depot at Gura and the naval repair base at Massawa. The restoration of Massawa's war-damaged harbor and its scuttled dry docks was directed by the U.S. Navy salvage officer Edward Ellsberg, who recounted the work in his memoir Under the Red Sea Sun.

== Authorization and secrecy ==
President Franklin D. Roosevelt authorized a secret air depot to be operated by American civilian volunteers under the Douglas Aircraft Company. The operation was set in motion at a secret War Department meeting on November 19, 1941, while the United States was still neutral and weeks before the attack on Pearl Harbor.

The Douglas Aircraft Company had been selected in October 1941 to operate the depot as a contractor for the Air Corps, and under a contract signed that December it undertook to run it on Lend-Lease funds.

The operation's classified designation was "Project 19." The reason for the number is not explained in published accounts. There was a sister operation code-named Project Cedar, which ferried aircraft to the Soviet Union through Iran.

== Organization and operations ==
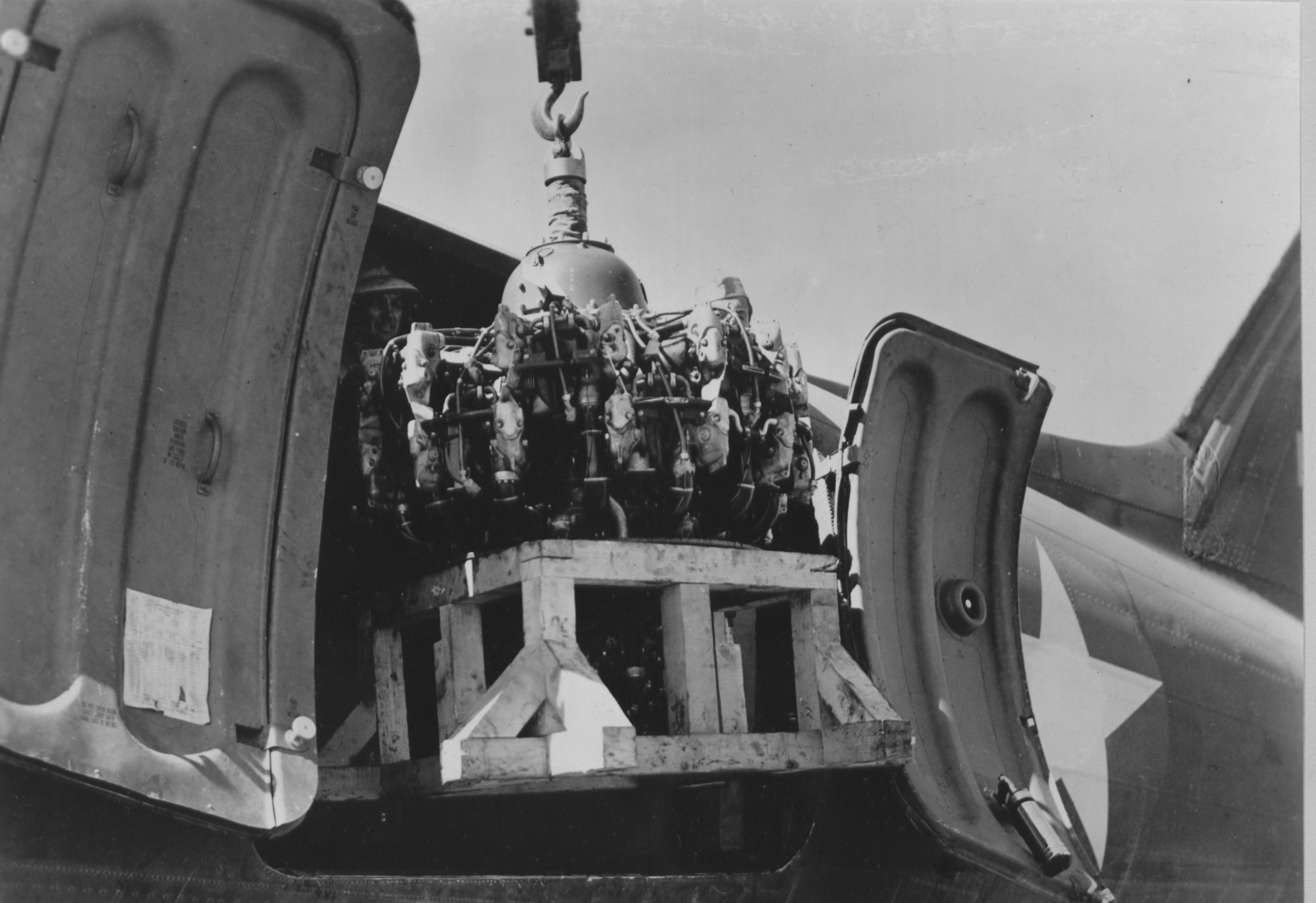
A radial aircraft engine, crated on a pallet, is loaded aboard a C-47 at the depot.

Project 19's work was divided between two American companies. The Douglas Aircraft Company directed the repair and assembly of aircraft, while construction and logistics were assigned to the engineering contractor Johnson, Drake & Piper. The depot was staffed by civilian employees rather than military personnel, consistent with American neutrality.

Because about half of the depot's machinery had been lost at sea during the crossing, work began with salvaged Italian equipment left from the old Caproni plant and tools improvised from scrap metal.

The depot's first task was to repair damaged Royal Air Force aircraft, especially large numbers of Lend-Lease P-40 fighters, and return them to the North African battle zone with "minimum delay." To move battle-damaged P-40s, the engineers devised a way to ferry them by air, slinging the disassembled aircraft's wings beneath C-47 transports. The depot later also repaired United States Army Air Forces bombers and assembled new fighter aircraft.

Another principal function was the overhaul of aircraft engines of all types. After testing, overhauled engines were flown out aboard C-47 transports to India, North Africa, and Palestine.

== Italian air raid ==
In 1943, the depot was the target of an unusual long-range Italian bombing raid. On 23 May, two Savoia-Marchetti SM.75 aircraft, long-range civil transports modified to carry bombs, set out from their base on Rhodes, the easternmost Regia Aeronautica airfield and more than 3,000 km from the target, to destroy American bombers stored at Gura.

Running low on fuel, one aircraft turned back and bombed Port Sudan instead. The second reached Gura, found it heavily defended despite lying well behind the front line, and released its bombs before returning to Rhodes after a flight of some 6,600 km. It was the only bombing mission ever flown by the SM.75.

== Workforce and life at Gura ==
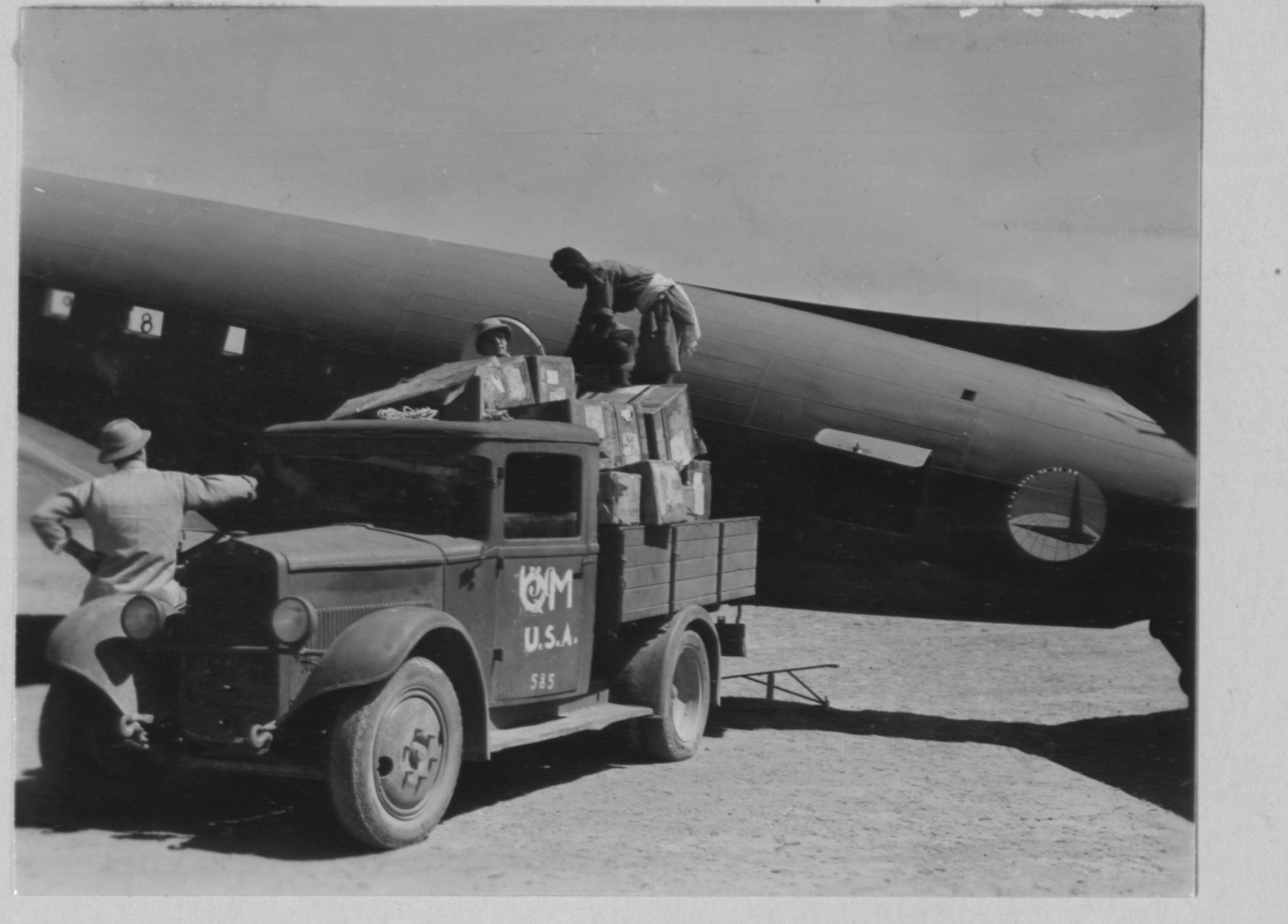
Eritrean laborers unload freight from a C-47, November 1942.

Project 19 initially recruited about 120 engineers from commercial firms across the United States. They were assembled in New York in December 1941 and screened by the FBI. The main body of the workforce sailed to Eritrea in a 20-ship convoy. Two of the ships were torpedoed and sunk by German U-boats off the coast of Cuba, with at least eight men rescued from rafts, and about half of the project's specialized equipment was lost on the way to Massawa. Some 2,106 employees reached Eritrea, and at its peak the project employed about 3,000 men.

The workforce spanned many trades and professions beyond aircraft engineers, including physicians, nurses, and cooks, supported by a sizable medical staff. Local Eritrean laborers were also employed at the depot.

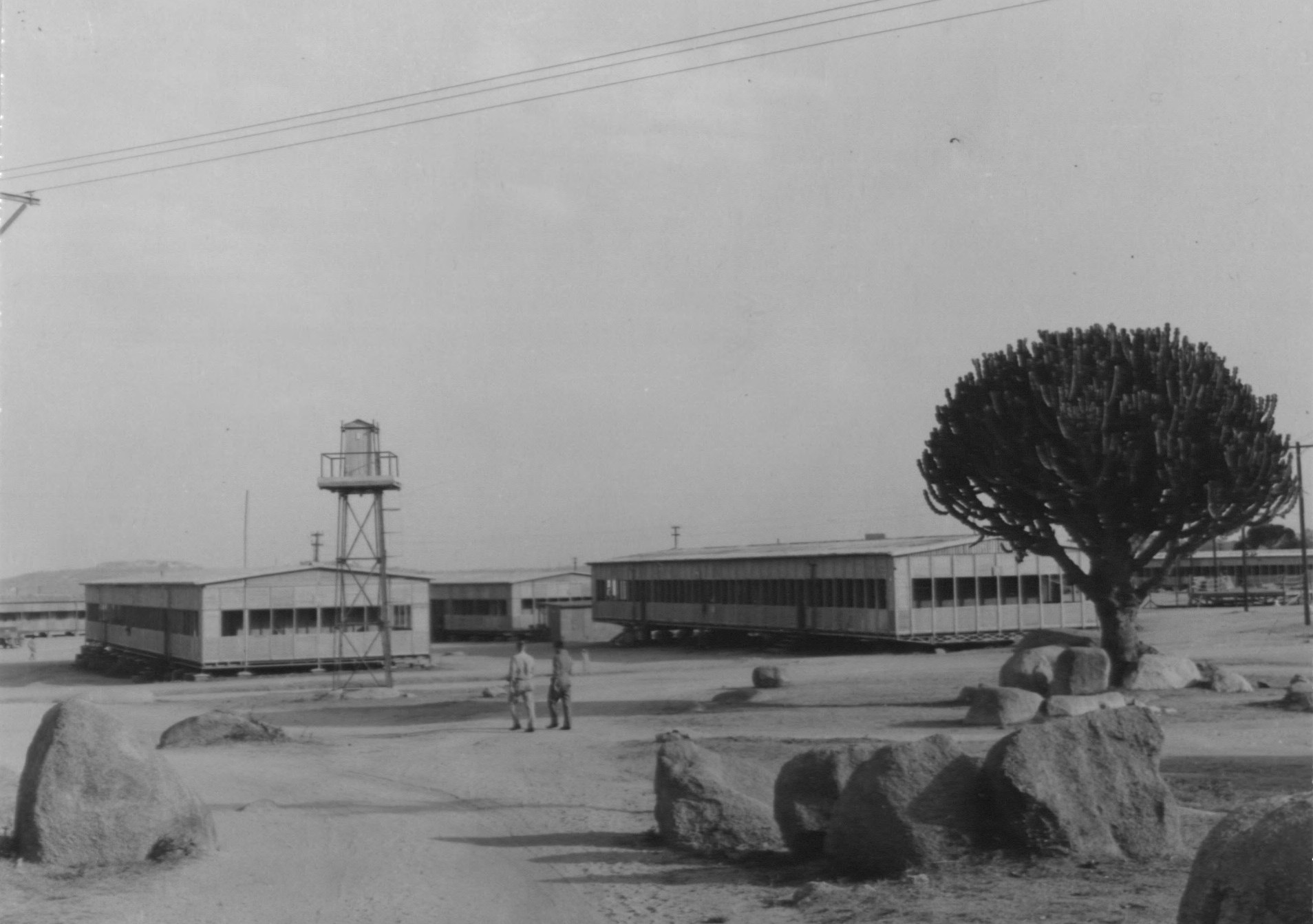
Barracks for the Douglas Aircraft workers at Gura. Camp water tower behind.

Life at the base was relatively relaxed for a posting far behind the front. It offered amenities including mess halls, a cinema, a chapel, and a nine-hole golf course, whose local rules reflected the wartime setting by, for example, allowing balls to be lifted from bomb craters without penalty and warning players not to touch unexploded bombs.

The camp produced a daily paper, The Trailblazer, edited by T. H. Vail Motter, who later wrote the U.S. Army's official history of the Persian Corridor. The American folklorist and novelist Harold Courlander served as the depot's historian in 1942–43. Eight men of Project 19 were killed in the course of their duties.

== Closure and legacy ==
Project 19's purpose was to sustain Allied air power in the North African campaign by returning damaged aircraft to the front quickly from a secure rear area. As Axis forces were defeated and driven from Africa in 1943, that mission came to an end and the depot wound down. Project 19 closed in 1943, and its last personnel were evacuated late in the year.

As the air depot mission ended, the United States shifted its regional presence to one of a long-term communications base, refurbishing the former Italian Radio Marina station outside Asmara. The new installation became known as Kagnew Station.

After the war, British administrators dismantled the Gura air base, leaving little behind other than the tarmac. The town was eclipsed by nearby Dekemhare. Almost no trace of Project 19 remained on the site.

Conducted in secret and carried out by civilians before the United States formally entered the war, Project 19 belonged to what has been described as a forgotten theater of the conflict and drew little lasting public attention.

== See also ==
- East African campaign (World War II)
