= No Banners, No Bugles =

1949 book by Edward Ellsberg

- First edition
- Author: Edward Ellsberg
- Language: English
- Publisher: Dodd, Mead & Company
- Publication date: 1949
- Publication place: United States

No Banners, No Bugles (New York: Dodd, Mead & Company, 1949) is a book by Edward Ellsberg describing his activities as Principal Salvage Officer for Operation Torch during World War II.

Like his book Under the Red Sea Sun about salvage work in Massawa earlier in the war, this book describes daring adventures and monumental accomplishments. It also describes cases where red tape, incompetence, and cowardice caused valuable ships to be lost.

== Bibliography ==
- Ellsberg, Commander Edward (1949). No Banners, No Bugles. New York: Dodd, Mead, and Company.
