= Kagnew Station =

Former United States Army signals intelligence facility in present-day Eritrea

- Asmara, Eritrea
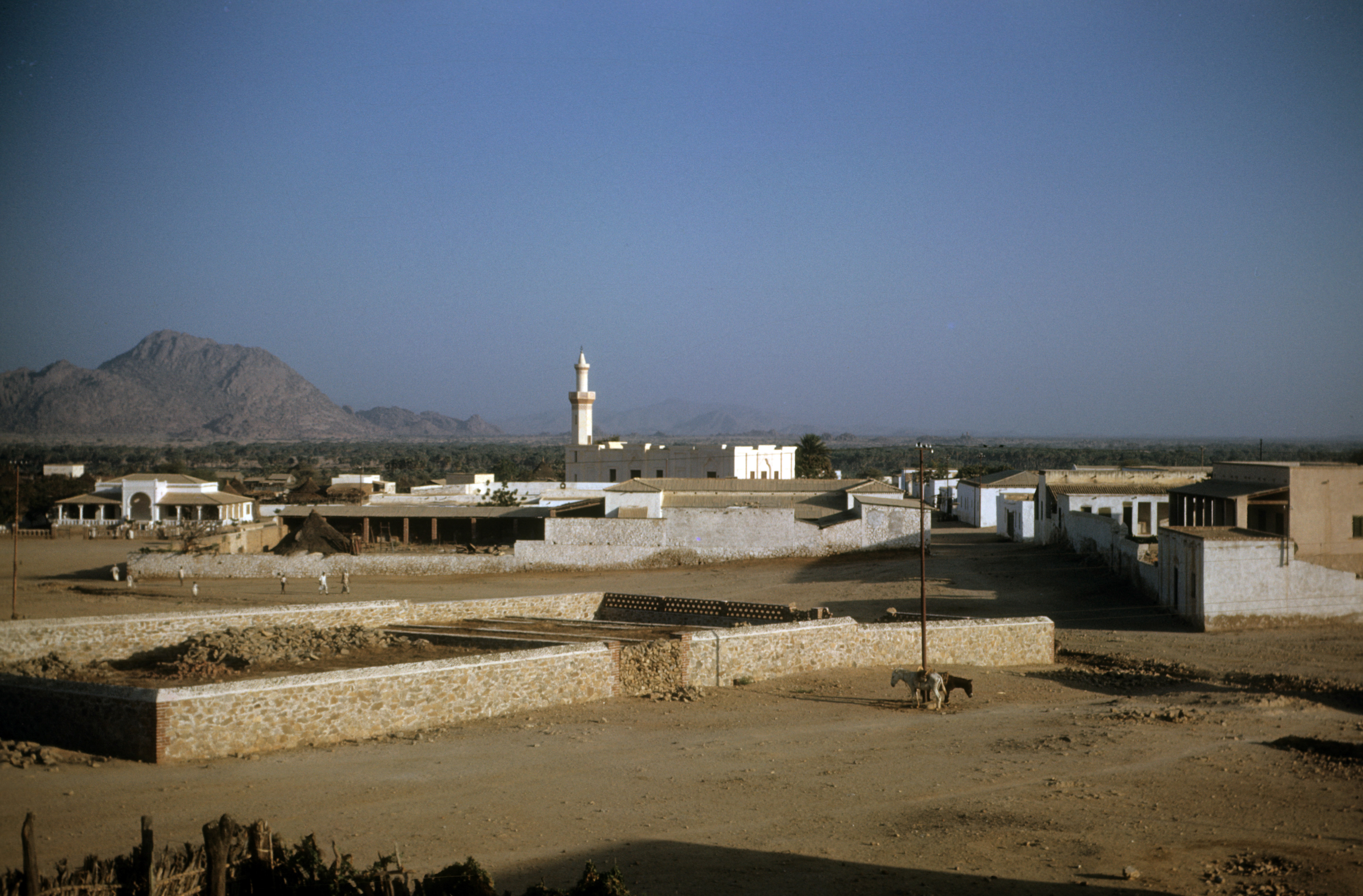

Site information
- Type: Communications and SIGINT station
- Controlled by: United States

Location
- Location within Eritrea
- Coordinates: 15.329996°N 38.91967°E

Site history
- In use: 1943–1977

Garrison information
- Garrison: United States Army

Kagnew Station (also known as NAVCOMMSTA Asmara) was a United States Army installation in Asmara, Eritrea on the Horn of Africa. The installation was established in 1943 as a U.S. Army radio station, taking over and refurbishing a pre-existing Italian naval radio station, Radio Marina, after Italian forces based in Asmara surrendered to the Allies in 1941. On 30 June 1973, the Navy took command of Kagnew Station and renamed it NAVCOMMSTA Asmara. Kagnew Station operated until April 29, 1977, when the last Americans left. The station was home to the United States Army's 2nd Signal Service Battalion.

The station served four key purposes: it was a U.S. Army strategic communications site, an earth terminal for the Defense Satellite Communications System, a Navy communications station, and a high-frequency transmitter for diplomatic communications.

It operated as a city within a city, with its own water system, recreation facilities and housing. The presence of Kagnew was deeply unpopular with Eritrean nationalists and students.

== Overview ==
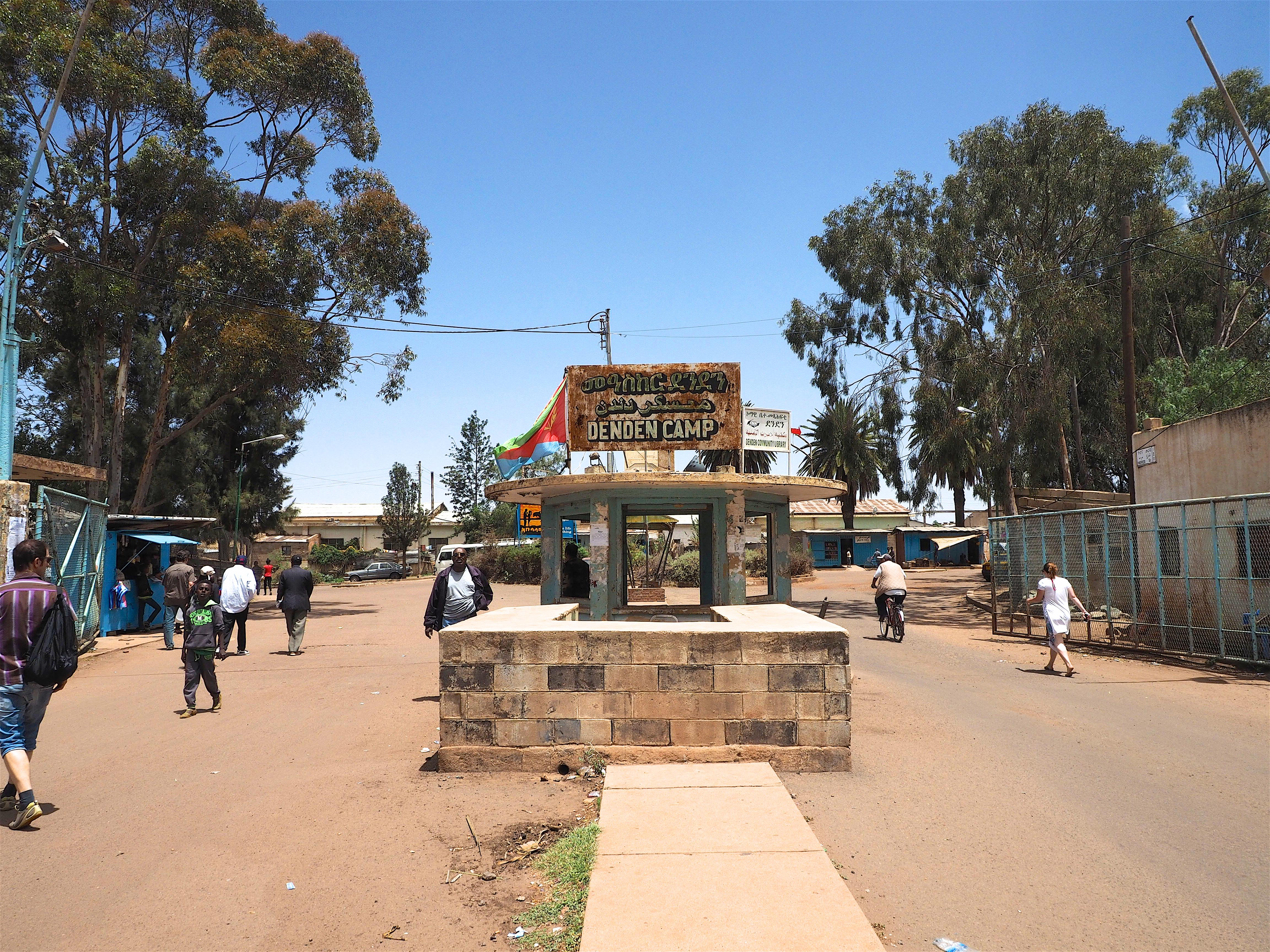
Former Kagnew Station

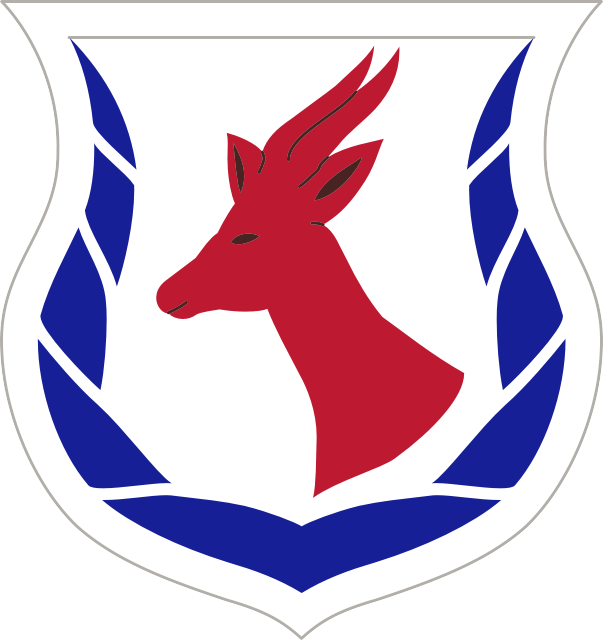
Kagnew Station - East Africa SSI

The Cold War listening station, Kagnew Station, was located fairly close to the equator and at an altitude of 7,300 feet (2,200 m) above sea level. Its altitude and close proximity to the equator made Kagnew Station an ideal site for the Cold War listening station's dishes and the 2,500-acre (10 km^{2}) antenna farm. In all Kagnew sprawled over 3,400 acres (14 km^{2}) containing eight fenced or walled tracts. Kagnew Station became home for over 6,000 American citizens at a time during its peak years of operation during the 1960s.

Fighting between the Ethiopian military and Eritrean resistance fighters forced the closing of military's Keren R & R Center, located in the city of Keren in 1971. The Massawa R&R Center (the U.S. Army Red Sea Rest Center), located on the Red Sea closed after departure of the Army in 1973. The U.S. Army's $12 million cost for maintaining their soldiers at Kagnew Station faced a budget axe in 1972 and the U.S. Army withdrew from Kagnew Station in 1973 but the Navy personnel remained. Command of Kagnew Station was transferred from the Army to the Navy on July 1, 1973.

Fighting between the Eritrean resistance and the Ethiopian government forces began affecting operations at Kagnew Station in the 1970s. In March 1971, 3,500 Americans remained at Kagnew Station, 1,900 personnel (1,700 of whom were military) and 1,600 dependents. By July 18, 1972, U.S. personnel at Kagnew Station were reduced to 900 personnel. In March 1974, only 100 civilian technicians remained to operate the residual communications facility, along with their families, and eight to ten U.S. military personnel.

On the night of January 31, 1975, heavy fighting broke out in Eritrea and incoming rocket-propelled grenades landed inside the Tract E compound. This began a season of frequent nighttime firefights between the Eritrean resistance and the Soviet-backed Ethiopian forces. On 14 July 1975, gunmen abducted two Americans and four Ethiopians from Kagnew Communications Station. The Americans, Steve Campbell and Jim Harrel, worked for Collins International Service Company (CISCO), a government contractor. On Friday 12 September 1975, the Eritrean Liberation Front, ELF, raided the US facility at Asmara, kidnapping a further eight people, including two Americans.

On February 12, 1976, a meeting at the White House Situation Room took place discussing Kagnew Station. Lt. General Smith stated, "Right now fleet operations are dependent on Kagnew. The Navy has a strong interest in keeping it. They have reaffirmed to me that if they don't have Kagnew they would need a similar site elsewhere". At one point in the discussion, Asst. Secretary of Defense James Noyes said, "Yes. If we didn't have Kagnew there would be communications delays 25% of the time."

By December 1976 the only critical function appeared to be Mystic Star. In the same memorandum, the United States Department of Defense stated, "It recommends closing Kagnew by September 1977 if Mystic Star can be relocated."

U.S. State Department "Background Notes: State of Eritrea, March 1998," stated, "In the 1970s, technological advances in the satellite and communications fields were making the communications station at Kagnew increasingly obsolete. Early in 1977, the United States informed the Ethiopian Government that it intended to close Kagnew Station by September 30, 1977. In the meantime, U.S. relations with the Mengistu regime were worsening. In April 1977, Mengistu abrogated the 1953 mutual defense treaty and ordered a reduction of U.S. personnel in Ethiopia, including the closure of Kagnew Communications Center and the consulate in Asmara." Not included in the report are the circumstances of the closing of Kagnew Station. In April, 1977, The Ethiopian Government closed the United States military installations and gave Military Assistance Advisory Group (MAAG) personnel a week's notice to leave the country. A large store of equipment remained behind in the rapid American departure. Ethiopia then abrogated the 1953 United States-Ethiopian Mutual Defense Assistance Agreement and terminated the lease on Kagnew station. On April 29, 1977, the last Americans left Kagnew Station.

== History ==
=== World War II ===
In March 1941 Roosevelt administration declared Ethiopia eligible for the military aid program known as the Lend-Lease program. This was done to support the British troops in Libya and Egypt which were fighting Germany's Afrika Korps. The focus of the lend-lease program was in Eritrea, a former Italian colony which strategically bordered the Red Sea.

The principal American undertaking in wartime Eritrea was Project 19, a secret aircraft repair depot at Gura staffed by several thousand civilian workers of the Douglas Aircraft Company, which repaired British and American military aircraft until it closed in 1943.

Additionally, British forces had established a communications base at the former Italian radio communications base named called Radio Marina, which was located in Asmara, Eritrea. The British used the former Italian name for the base, Radio Marina. The United States received access to the base from the British beginning in 1942. The United States would initially call the former Radio Marina the "Asmara Barracks," but the name "Radio Marina" would become the more enduring name for the base until the base was officially named "Kagnew Station."

In 1943 a seven-man detachment refurbished the former British facilities and began testing the new equipment they installed. Eritrea's geographical location; 15 degrees north of the equator at an altitude of 7,600 feet (2,300 m), was excellent for sending and receiving radio signals. Early testing proved so promising that the War Department moved to expand operations before Asmara Barracks officially opened.

On June 1, 1943, two officers, one warrant officer and 44 enlisted men began intensive training at Vint Hill Farms to man Radio Marina. In December, 4 officers and 50 enlisted men staffed Radio Marina, a base located on an arrowhead-shaped tract of land, designated as Tract A by the U.S. Military. The army began intercepting and decoding transmissions sent between the Germans and Japanese. While the United States had access to base since 1942, a formalized agreement to permit the United States use of the site did not exist until 1952 when the Ethiopian government, the federation of Eritrea and the United States signed an agreement.

=== Cold War ===
In 1953, the base officially acquired the name of Kagnew Station. The United States signed a 25-year base-rights agreement with the Ethiopian government, a tract of land several city blocks to the west of Tract A, which it designated Tract E. In 1957 the activities and headquarters for Kagnew Station began moving to Tract E. Kagnew Station was officially dedicated in 1958 on Tract E.

Kagnew Station was supplied by planes from the U.S. Airbase in Dhahran, Saudi Arabia, and by ships docking at the Red Sea port of Massawa. Its chapel had a seating capacity of 220 and an over-flow space to accommodate 150 more persons. The Guest House had eight rooms, a lobby and a kitchen, all made of concrete-block construction. The Roosevelt Theatre seated 320 patrons and was equipped with a CinemaScope screen and the latest sound and projection equipment. The gymnasium had a regulation basketball court with bleachers, retractable backboards and an electric scoreboard. It also housed ten bowling lanes, a boxing ring, gymnastic equipment, a locker room and shower rooms. The Dependent School had 17 classrooms, a large auditorium, science laboratory and library. A combined laundry-and-dry-cleaning plant could clean 50,000 pieces a month. KANU TV and KANU Radio provided television and radio services. Kagnew also had the usual Commissary, Post Exchange, snack bar and post office. The base Service Center included a music room, craft shop, photography darkroom, library and an auto shop. A football field, softball field and an indoor pool were also available. Children could play golf on the $22,000 miniature golf course; and adults played on the 18-hole golf course. Kagnew Farms, located northwest of Tract E, on the old Radio Marina Transmitter Site, became a recreation and picnic area known as Kagnew Farms until construction of STONEHOUSE at the same site in 1964. Kagnew Farms contained a skeet range, a small-bore rifle and pistol range, the Afro-American Racing Club's banked-dirt oval track (Used for car races, motorcycle scrambles and gherry cart races.), and a large picnic area.

The military passed off Kagnew Station as a "telephone relay station" to disguise its real activities. The secret of Kagnew Station was kept not by hiding the equipment but by openly displaying the equipment and passing it off as something innocent: a telephone relay station and deep space research site. In 1964, an 85-foot (26 m) dish and a 150-foot (46 m) dish arrived in Massawa and were brought up the mountain in sections to Kagnew Station. The dishes were used at Stonehouse, the military's "Deep Space Research Site," which was a joint project of the North American Aerospace Defense Command (NORAD) and the Army Security Agency (ASA). Other agencies operating at Kagnew Station included the Central Intelligence Agency (CIA), the Army Security Agency (ASA), the U.S. Strategic Communications Command (STRATCOM), the Navy Communications (NAVCOMM) and a signal research unit. Located on nearly the same longitude as the Soviet deep space command center in the Crimea, the large Stonehouse antennas were used to monitor telemetry from a variety of Russian spacecraft.

=== Eritrean war of independence ===
During the 1960s and 1970s Kagnew station was extremely unpopular with Eritrean nationalists and students, as it was viewed as an obvious symbol of an alliance between Emperor Haile Selassie's Ethiopia and American imperialism. By 1970 there were 3,200 Americans on the base. Due to its heavy protection, the Eritrean Liberation Front (ELF) and students could do little about the station until the US government began withdrawing its personnel following the Ethiopian revolution during 1974.
