= Operation Cedar =

WWII project to deliver short-range aircraft from the US to the USSR

Project Cedar (also known as Operation Cedar, short for "Civilian Emergency Defence Aid to Russia") was a World War II project to deliver short-range aircraft from the United States to the USSR via Abadan, Iran, in the Persian Gulf.

The project was initiated before the United States' entry into the war, a base was established on Abadan Island in March 1942. Oil tankers, returning from delivering oil to the United States, would take Bell P-39, Curtiss P-40, and Douglas A-20 parts to Abadan, where they were assembled into aircraft and flown to USSR. The 82nd Air Depot Group was part of Project Cedar. The head of the project on the Soviet side was Leonid Ivanovich Zorin.

Another similarly secret operation, Project 19, was set up in Gura, Eritrea, to repair RAF aircraft.

== See also ==
- Lend-Lease
- Persian Corridor
