= Garage and Fire Station (Fort Peck, Montana) =

- U.S. National Register of Historic Places
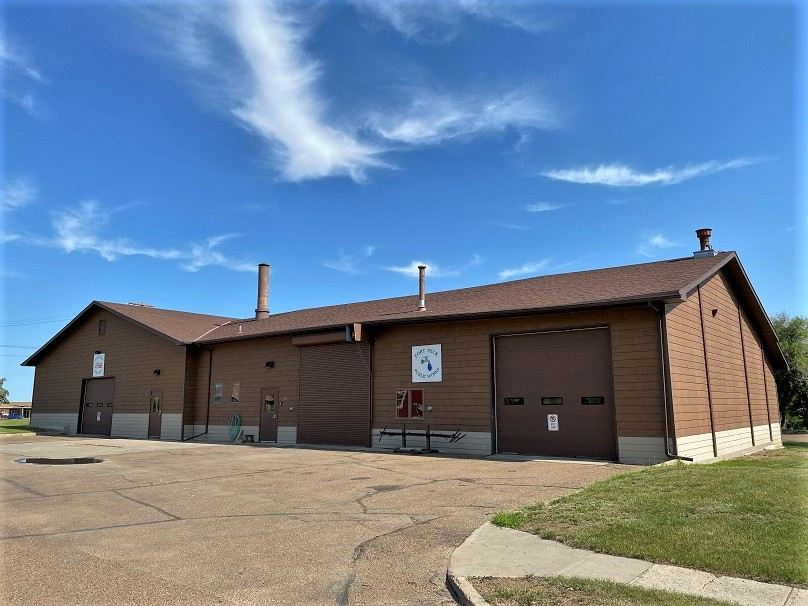

- Location within Montana Location within the United States
- Location: Gasconade St., Fort Peck, Montana
- Coordinates: 48°00′29″N 106°26′51″W
- Area: less than one acre
- Built: 1934
- Architect: Johnson, Drake & Piper
- Architectural style: Swiss Chalet
- MPS: Fort Peck MRA
- NRHP reference No.: 86002063
- Added to NRHP: August 13, 1986

The Garage and Fire Station in Fort Peck, Montana, on Gasconade St., was built in 1934. It is also known as Security Center (Fire & Police) and Vehicle Storage. It was listed in the National Register of Historic Places in 1986.

Like many other Fort Peck buildings, it was designed by architects Johnson, Drake & Piper. It is an L-shaped one-story wood-frame building which is Swiss Chalet in style. It was originally stained brown or gray, like the other Swiss Chalet buildings, and its trim was painted blue, green, red, or maroon. It has some timber bracketing.

The building served as Fort Peck's fire station and police station, and also stored vehicles.
