= Johnson, Drake & Piper =

American construction contracting firm

Johnson, Drake & Piper was a construction contracting firm.

== Overview ==
During World War II, the firm was the construction and logistics contractor for Project 19, a secret United States Lend-Lease operation in what is now Eritrea, centered on an aircraft-repair depot at Gura. Its work included housing at Ghinda intended for salvage crews at the port of Massawa, which American master diver Edward Ellsberg, then clearing the port of sunken ships, derided as too far from the port for practical use.

A number of the firm's works at Fort Peck, Montana, in support of the 1930s construction of the Fort Peck Dam, are listed on the National Register of Historic Places.

The firm's percentage-of-completion method for accounting for ongoing projects were challenged in a Federal appeals court case: Johnson, Drake & Piper, Inc., Appellant, v. United States of America, Appellee. Jobs completed by the firm discussed in the case include work in the country of Honduras, highway construction work in the U.S., and other types of work. The firm ceased construction contract work in 1966.

== Works ==
Works by the firm include:

- Employee's Hotel and Garage, S. Missouri Ave., Fort Peck, MT (Johnson, Drake & Piper), NRHP-listed
- Fort Peck Original Houses Historic District, 1101-1112 E. Kansas Ave., Fort Peck, MT (Johnson, Drake & Piper), NRHP-listed
- Garage and Fire Station, Gasconade St., Fort Peck, MT (Johnson, Drake & Piper), NRHP-listed
- Hospital (Fort Peck, Montana), S. Platte St., Fort Peck, MT (Johnson, Drake & Piper), NRHP-listed
- School (Fort Peck, Montana), N. Missouri Ave., Fort Peck, MT (Johnson, Drake & Piper), NRHP-listed
