= Persian Corridor =

Supply route in World War II

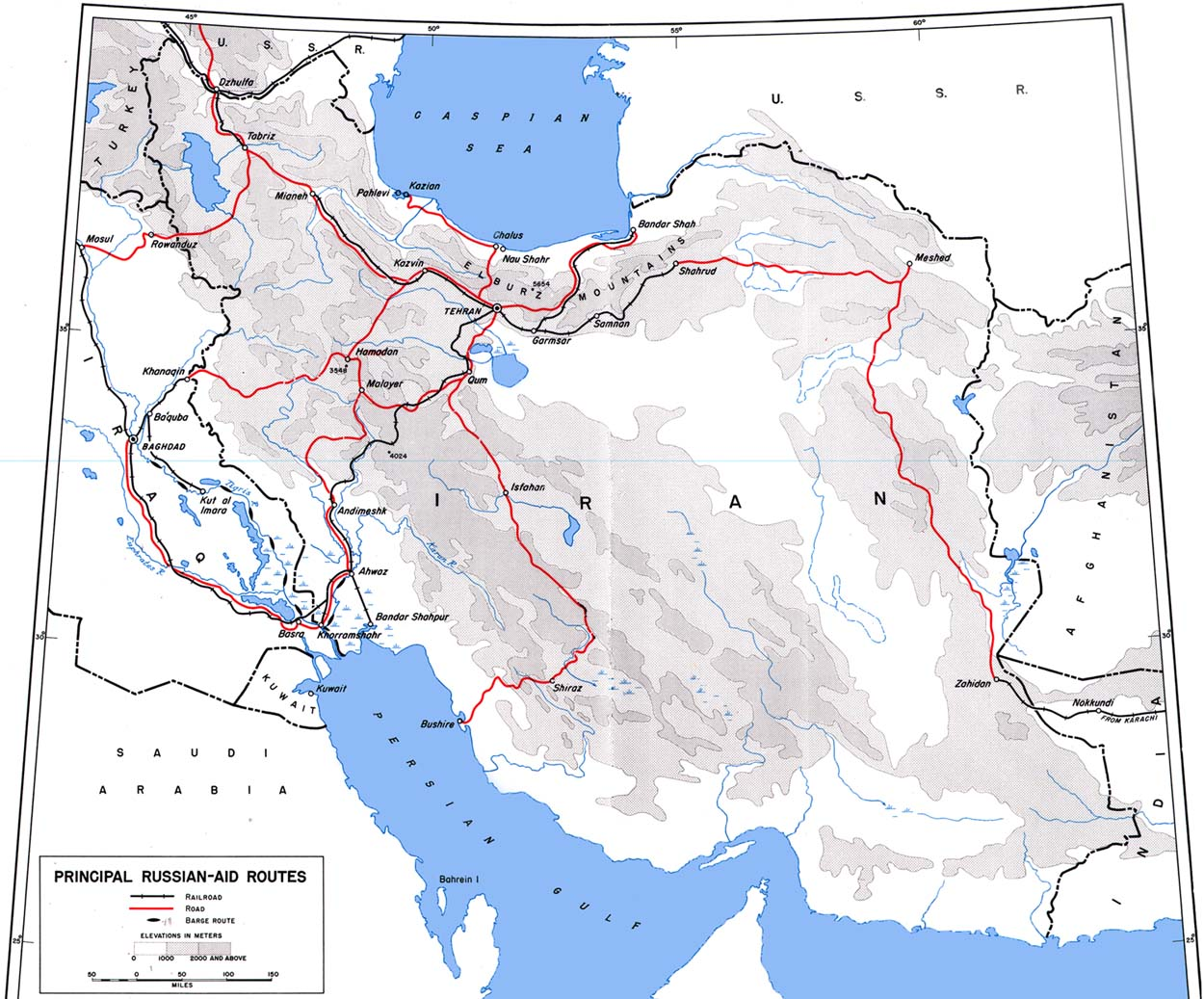
Allied road and rail supply lines through Persia into the USSR

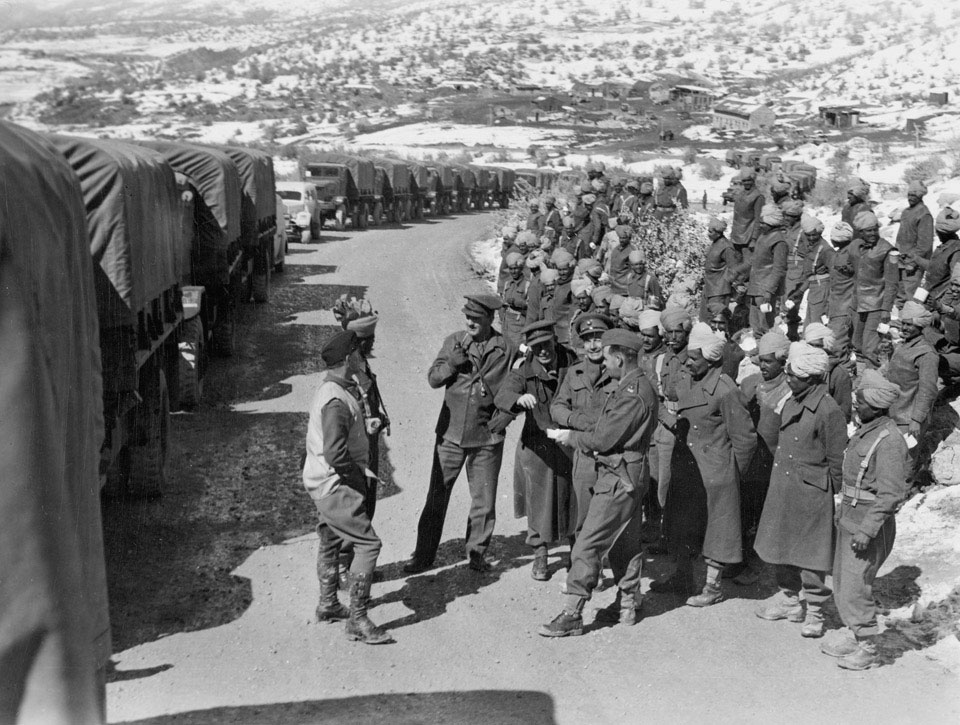
Indian Army soldiers stand next to a supply convoy en route to the Soviet Union, 1944

The Persian Corridor (Persian: دالان پارسی) was a supply route through Iran into Soviet Azerbaijan by which British aid and American Lend-Lease supplies were transferred to the Soviet Union during World War II. Of the 17.5 million long tons of US Lend-Lease aid provided to the Soviet Union, 7.9 million long tons (45%) were sent through Iran.

This supply route originated in the US and the UK with ships sailing around the Cape of Good Hope to the Persian Gulf. From there, the materiel transited Iran to the Soviet Union. Other supply routes included the Northern route across the Arctic, and the Pacific Route which handled US cargo at Vladivostok and then used the Trans-Siberian Railway across the Soviet Union.

This Persian Route became the only viable, all-weather route to be developed to supply Soviet needs.

== Etymology ==
English-language official documents from the Persian Corridor period continue to make the word "Persia" interchangeable with the name of Iran. In correspondence by the government of the United Kingdom, usage of "Persia" over "Iran" was chosen by Winston Churchill to avoid possible confusion with neighbouring Iraq.

== Background ==
=== Overthrow of the Shah ===
Following Germany's invasion of the Soviet Union in June 1941, Britain and the Soviet Union became allies. Britain and the Soviet Union saw the newly opened Trans-Iranian Railway as an attractive route to transport supplies from the Persian Gulf to the Soviet Union. Both countries used concessions extracted in previous interventions to pressure neutral Iran (and, in Britain's case, Iraq) into allowing the use of their territory for military and logistical purposes. Increased tensions with Britain led to pro-German rallies in Tehran. In August 1941, because Reza Shah refused to expel all German nationals and come down clearly on the Allied side, Britain and the Soviet Union invaded Iran, arrested the monarch, sent him into exile to South Africa and took control of Iran's communications and the coveted railway.

Alliances during the Second World War & The invasion of neutral Iran, 1939–1945.

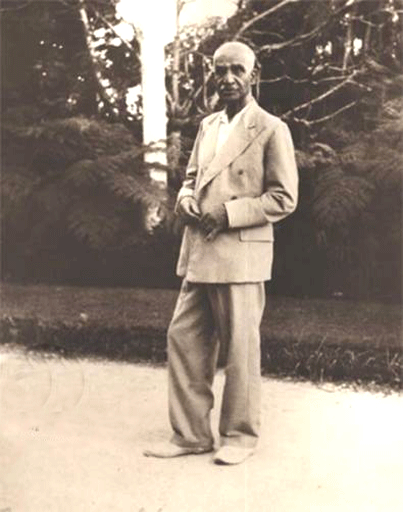
Reza Shah in exile.

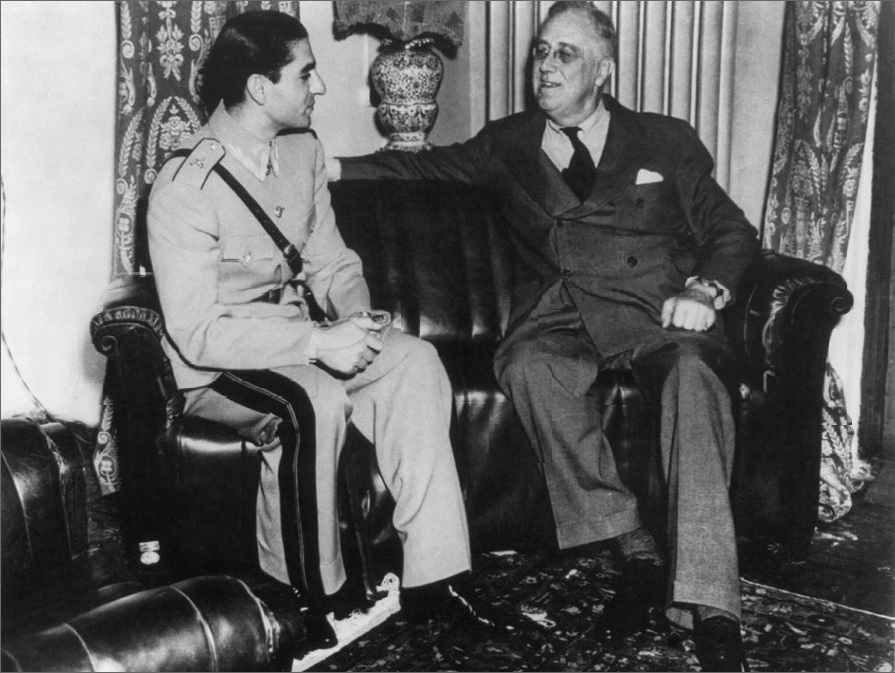
Son of Reza Shah meeting with F. D. Roosevelt at the Tehran Conference, 1943

In 1942 the United States, now an ally of Britain and the Soviet Union in World War II, sent a military force to Iran to help maintain and operate sections of the railway. The British and Soviet authorities allowed Reza Shah's system of government to collapse and limited the constitutional government interfaces. They installed Reza Shah's son, Mohammad Reza Pahlavi, onto the Iranian/Persian throne on 16 September 1941.

The new Shah soon signed an agreement pledging full non-military logistical co-operation with the British and Soviets in exchange for full recognition of his country's independence, and also a promise to withdraw from Iran within six months of the war's conclusion (the assurances later proved essential in securing his country's independence after the war). In September 1943, the Shah went further by declaring war on Germany. He signed the Declaration by United Nations entitling his country to a seat in the original United Nations. Two months later, he hosted the Tehran Conference between Churchill, Roosevelt, and Stalin.

The presence of so many foreign troops in Iran accelerated social change and it roused nationalist sentiment in the country. In 1946, Hossein Gol-e-Golab published the nationalist song Ey Iran, which was reportedly inspired by an incident during the war in which Golab witnessed an American GI beating up a native Iranian greengrocer in a marketplace dispute.

=== Strategic need for supply to Soviets ===
After the Dunkirk evacuation and the agreement with Vichy France, Germany was essentially without any military opposition in mainland Europe until Hitler launched Operation Barbarossa, the invasion of the Soviet Union in June 1941. To relieve pressure from the Soviets, British, and later American, leaders sought to open a Second Front in Europe. Realizing that would take time, the Western Allies made the strategic decision to provide Stalin with material support substantial enough to ensure that the Red Army could continue to engage the bulk of the German military. The Allies established protocols that defined the type and amount of material that would be delivered and when. German military action on the Arctic route, prevented the US from meeting the first protocol. That caused increasing pressure on the Allies to develop the Persian Corridor.

== Supply efforts ==
The Allies delivered all manner of materiel to the Soviet Union ranging from Studebaker US6 trucks to American canned food. Most of the supplies transiting through the Persian Corridor arrived by ship at various ports in the Persian Gulf and were then carried northwards by railroad or in long truck convoys. Some goods were later reloaded on board ships to cross the Caspian Sea and others continued their journey by truck.

The United States Army forces in the corridor were originally under the Iran-Iraq Service Command, later renamed the Persian Gulf Service Command (PGSC). That was the successor to the original United States Military Iranian Mission, which had been put in place to deliver Lend-Lease supplies before the United States had entered the World War. The mission was originally commanded by Colonel Don G. Shingler, who was replaced late in 1942 by Brigadier General Donald H. Connolly. Both the Iran-Iraq Service Command and the PGSC were subordinate to the US Army Forces in the Middle East (USAFIME). The PGSC was eventually renamed simply the Persian Gulf Command.

=== Statistics ===
Of the 17,500,000 long tons (17,800,000 t) of US lend-lease aid provided to Russia, 7,900,000 long tons (8,000,000 t) (45 per cent) were sent through Iran. In addition to the Persian Corridor the Americans used Arctic Convoys to the ports of Murmansk and Arkhangelsk and Soviet shipping carried supplies from the west coast of the US and Canada to Vladivostok, in the Far East, since the Soviets were not at war with Japan until August 1945. The Persian Corridor was the route for 4,159,117 long tons (4,225,858 t) of the cargo. That was not the only allied contribution via the Persian Corridor. About 7,900,000 long tons (8,000,000 t) of shipborne cargo from Allied sources were unloaded in the Corridor, most of it bound for the Soviet Union and some of it for British forces, under the Middle East Command, or for the Iranian economy, which was sustaining the influx of tens of thousands of foreign troops and Polish refugees. Also, supplies were needed for the development of new transport and supply facilities in Persia and in the Soviet Union. The tonnage figure does not include transfers of warplanes via Persia.

=== Supply routes ===
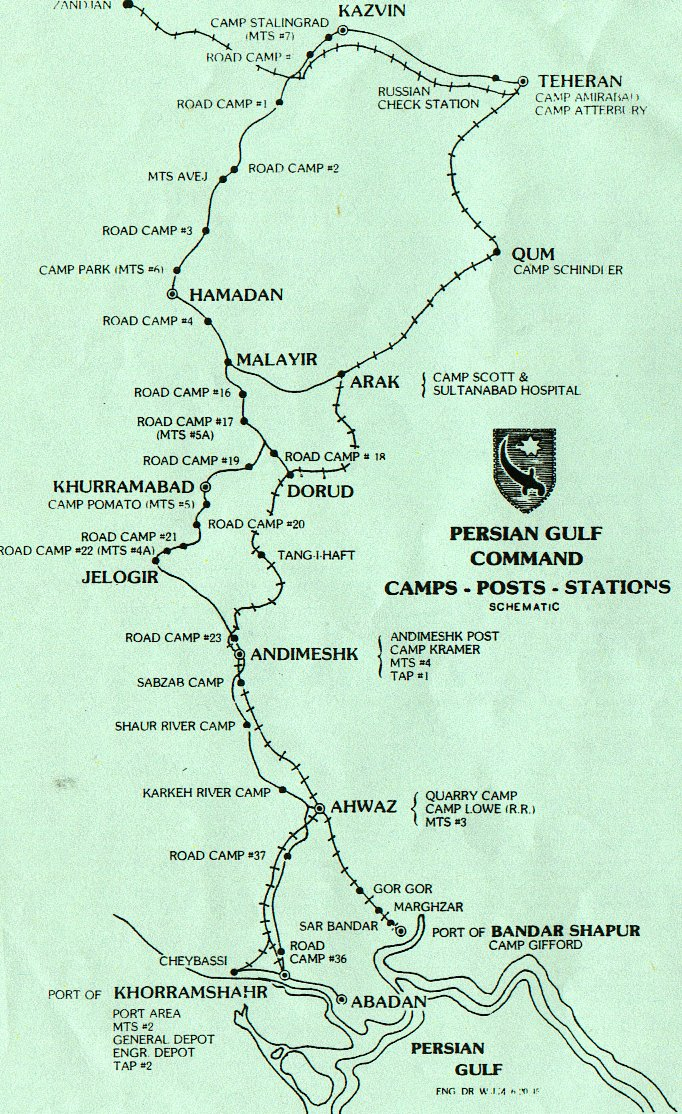
Persian Gulf Command, Camps - Posts - Stations

Supplies came from as far away as Canada and the United States, and those were unloaded in Persian Gulf ports in Iran and Iraq. Once the Axis powers were cleared from the Mediterranean Sea in 1943 — with the Allied capture of Tunisia, Sicily, and southern Italy — cargo convoys were able to pass through the Mediterranean, the Suez Canal, and the Red Sea to Iran for shipment to the Soviet Union.

The main ports in the Corridor for supplies inbound to Iran were: in Iran,

- Bushehr
- Bandar Shahpur (now Bandar Imam Khomeini); and

in Iraq,

- Basra
- Umm Qasr.

The main overland routes were from the ports to Tehran, and then

- Tehran — Ashgabat or
- Tehran — Baku

or, alternatively,

- Basra — Kazvin or
- Dzhulfa — Beslan.

The main port for outbound supplies (via the Caspian Sea) was Nowshahr. Ships ferried supplies from this port to Baku or Makhachkala.

==== Other locations ====
Important smaller ports and transit points on the routes included:

===== in Azerbaijan =====
- Lenkoran;

===== in Armenia =====
- Yerevan;

===== in Georgia =====
- Tbilisi;

===== in North Ossetia-Alania =====
- Beslan;

===== in Iran =====
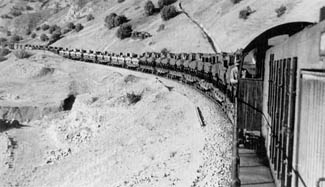
An Allied supply train en route through Iran bearing supplies for the Red Army

Ports

- Bandar Anzali
- Bandar Abbas
- Chabahar
- Noshahr
- Bandar-e Shah (now Bandar Torkoman)
- Amir Abad port
- Khoramshahr
- Bushehr
- Assalouyeh
- Mahshahr
- Bandar Shahpur
- Fereydunkenar

Cities

- Andimeshk
- Tehran
- Tabriz
- Hamadan
- Isfahan
- Karaj
- Khorramabad
- Kashan
- Malayer
- Mashad
- Mianeh
- Sari, Iran
- Semnan
- Shahroud
- Shiraz
- Tabriz
- Qom
- Zanjan
- Zahedan

===== in Turkmenistan =====
Ports

- Krasnovodsk

Cities

- Ashgabat
- Kizyl Arvat
- Kizyl Atrek

=== Volga River to Stalingrad ===
Beyond the Persian Corridor and across the Caspian Sea is the Volga River, flowing into the Caspian from the north. It was a major route for Lend-Lease supplies to reach the Soviet heartland.

One of the objectives of the 1942 German summer offensive was Stalingrad, at the easternmost turn of the Volga. The Germans captured part of the city, which blocked river transport of materiel from the Persian Corridor. Soviet victory in the Battle of Stalingrad (23 August 1942 – 2 February 1943) reopened the Volga route.

=== Personnel ===
Cargo was principally handled by special British and American transportation units from the nations' respective combat service support branches, such as the Royal Army Service Corps and the United States Army Quartermaster Corps. Many Allied civilian workers, such as stevedores and railway engineers, were also employed on the corridor. Many skilled engineers, accountants, and other professionals who volunteered or were drafted into the armed services were made warrant officers to help oversee the complex supply operations.

In addition to providing logistical support to the Iranians, the Allies offered other services as well. The Americans in particular were viewed as more neutral since they had no colonial past in the country as did the British and Soviets. The Americans contributed special expertise to the young Shah's government. Colonel Norman Schwarzkopf, Sr., who at the outbreak of the war was serving as superintendent of the New Jersey State Police was in August 1942 put in charge of training the Imperial Iranian Gendarmerie (his son, Norman Schwarzkopf, Jr., would command coalition forces fifty years later during the Persian Gulf War.)

=== Equipment ===
To help operate trains on the demanding Trans-Iranian Railway route, the US supplied large numbers of ALCO diesel locomotives, which were more suitable than steam locomotives. About 3,000 items of rolling stock of various types were also supplied.

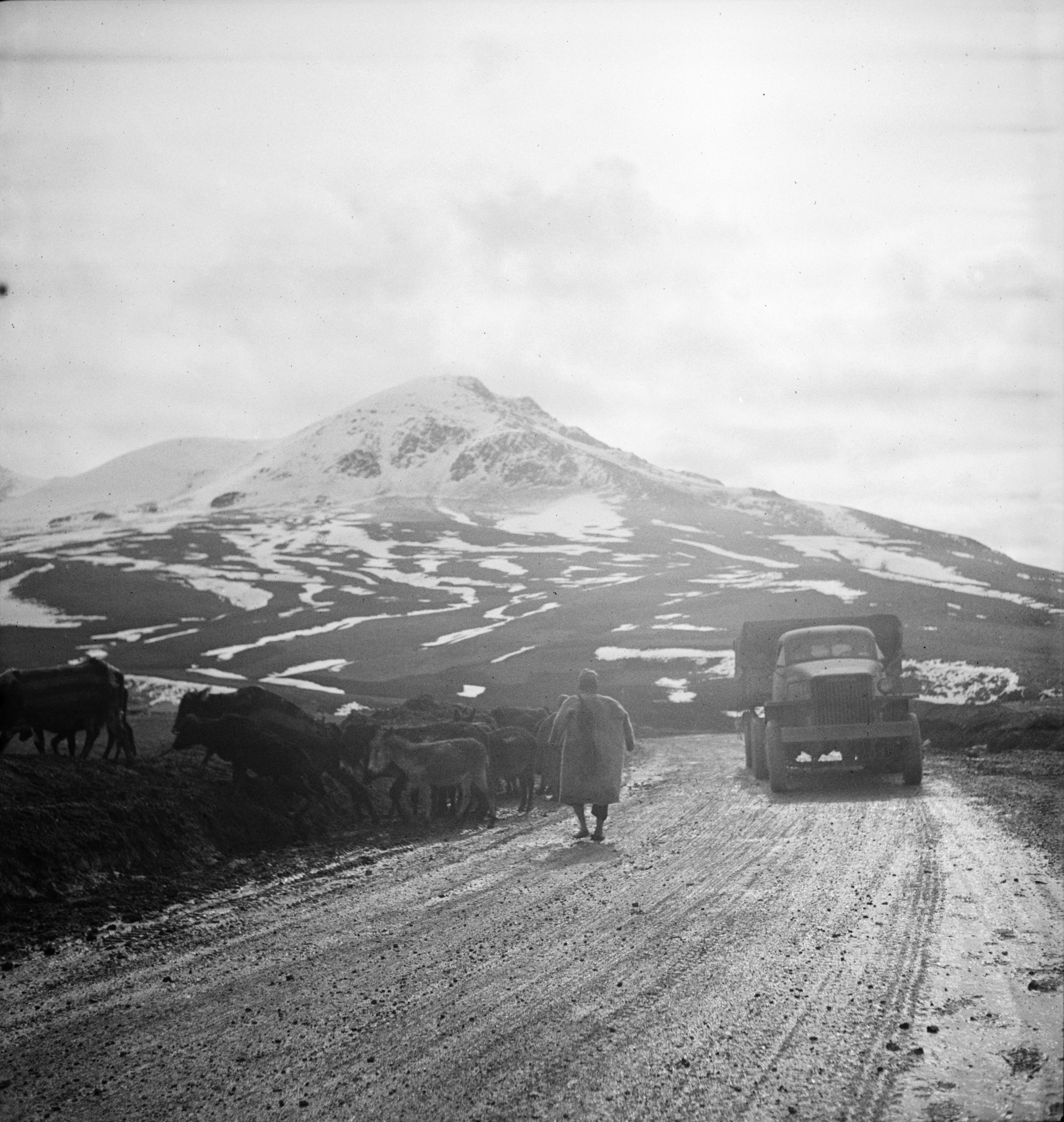
A US Army truck convoy carrying supplies for the Soviets somewhere along the Persian Corridor. c. 1943

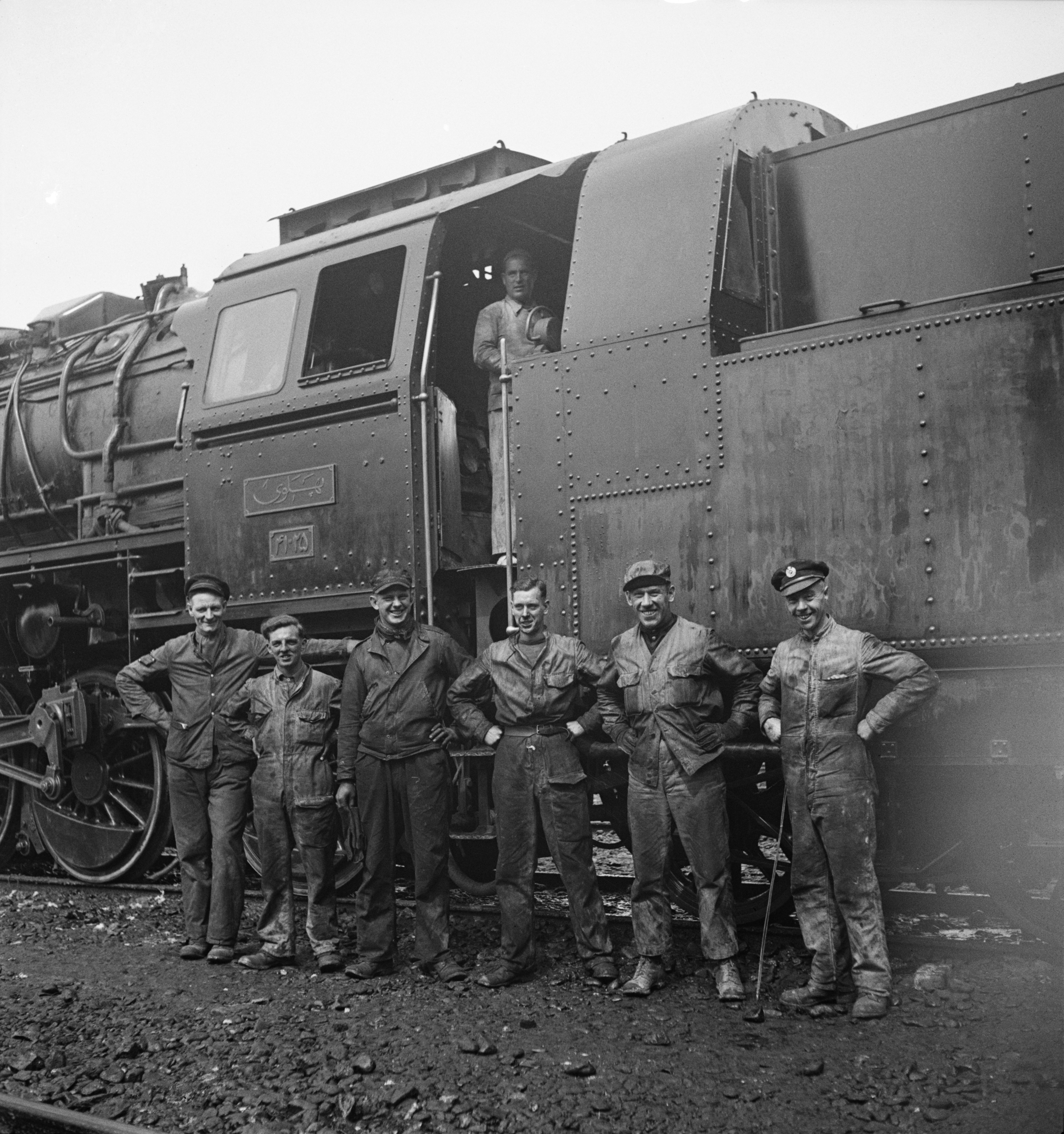
American and British railroad crews operated trains and trucks to bring supplies to the USSR. c.1943

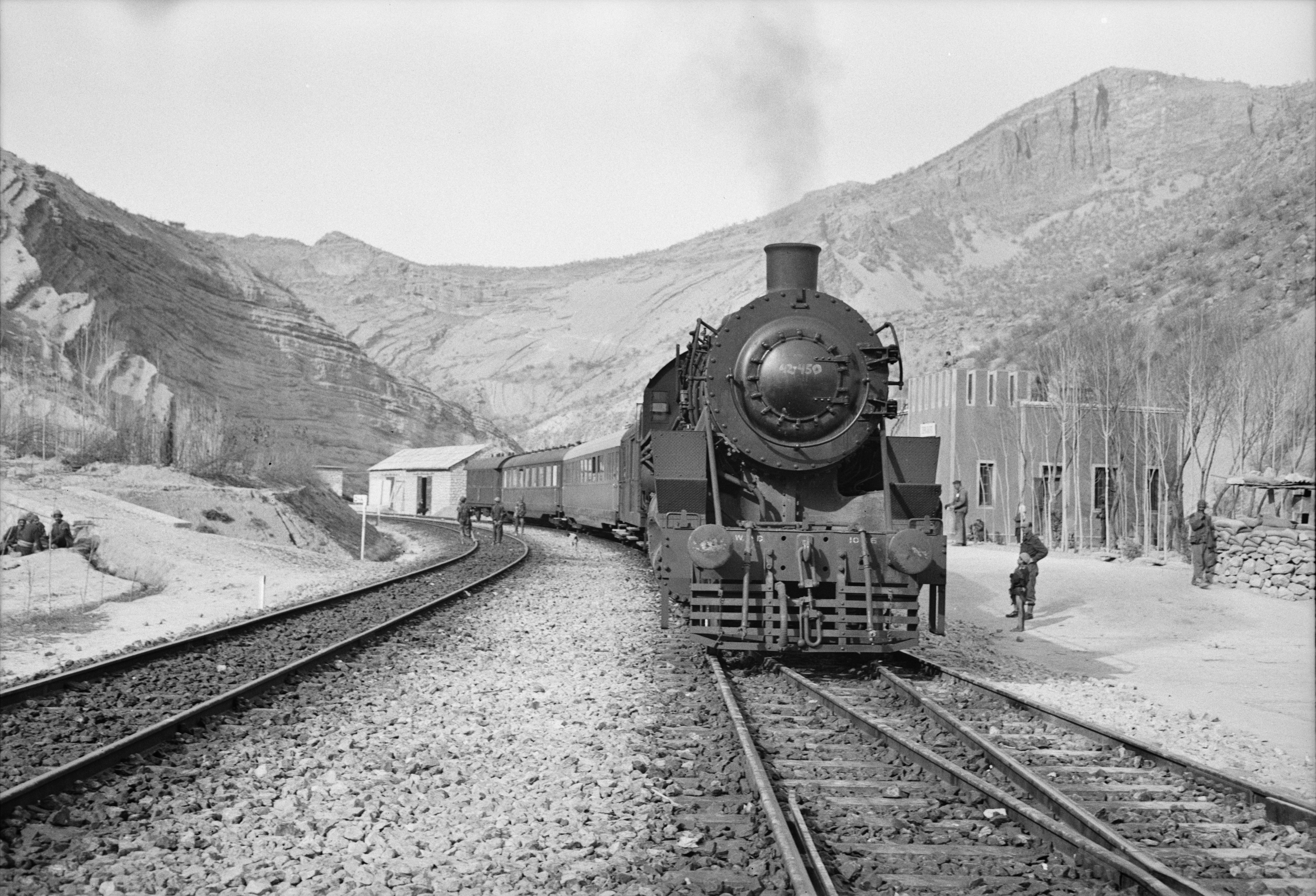
An American train transporting aid bound for the USSR stopping at a station. Supplies moved by road, rail and air through the Persian Corridor. c. 1943

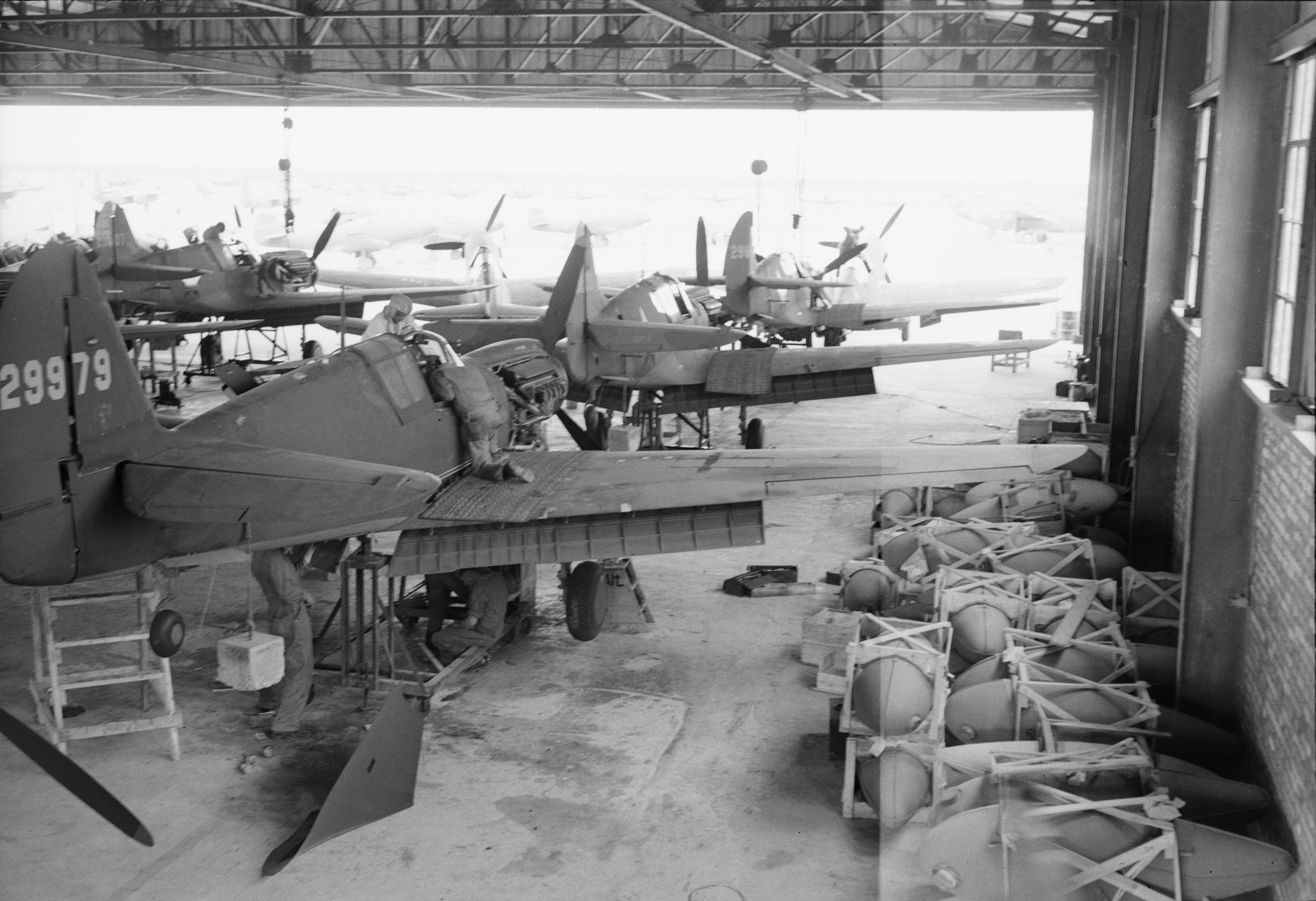
An assembly plant for American Curtiss P-40 fighters destined for Russia, somewhere in Iran. c.1943

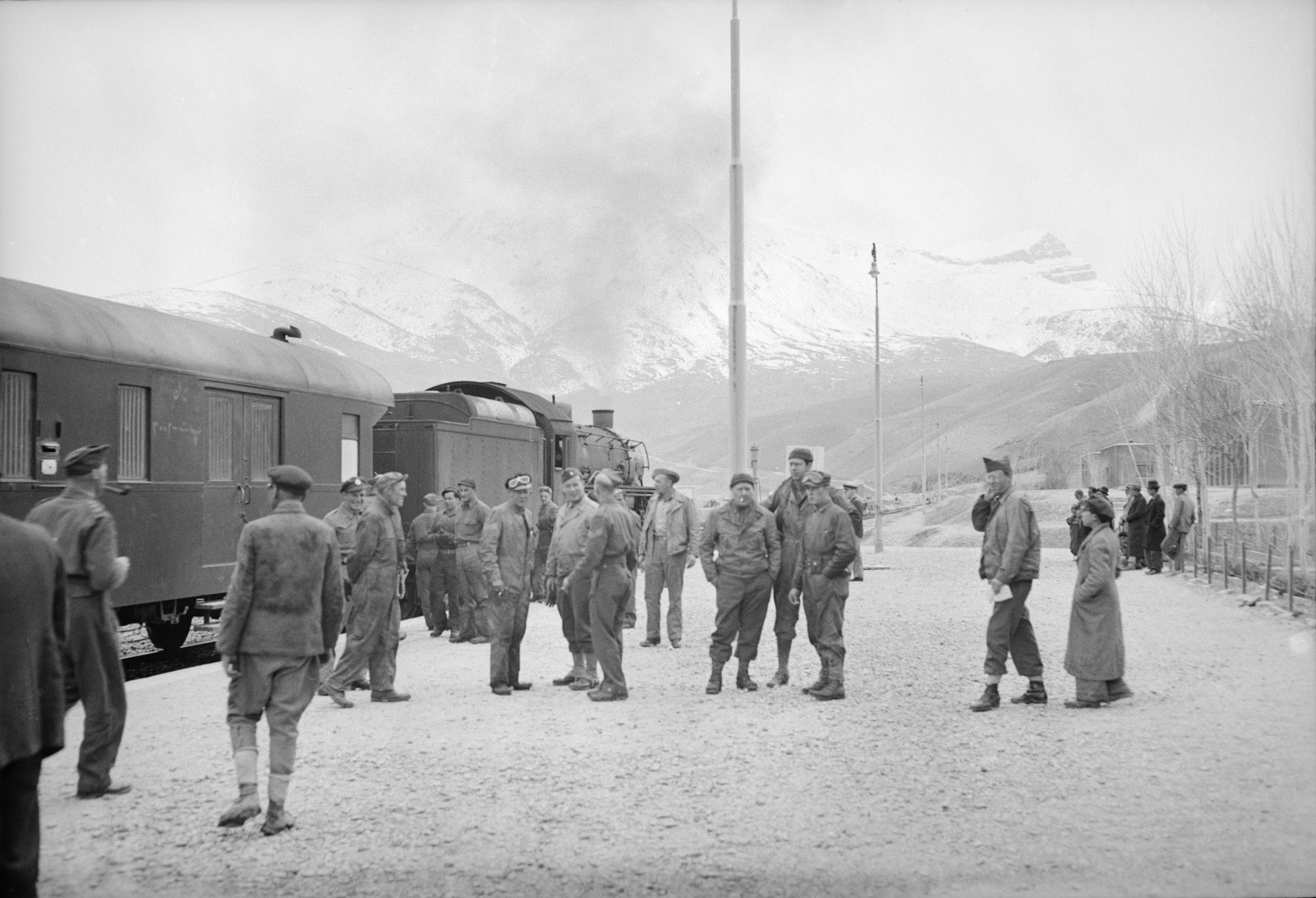
American and British Army train crewmen standing at a station. An American locomotive is seen at the head of the train at left. c. 1943

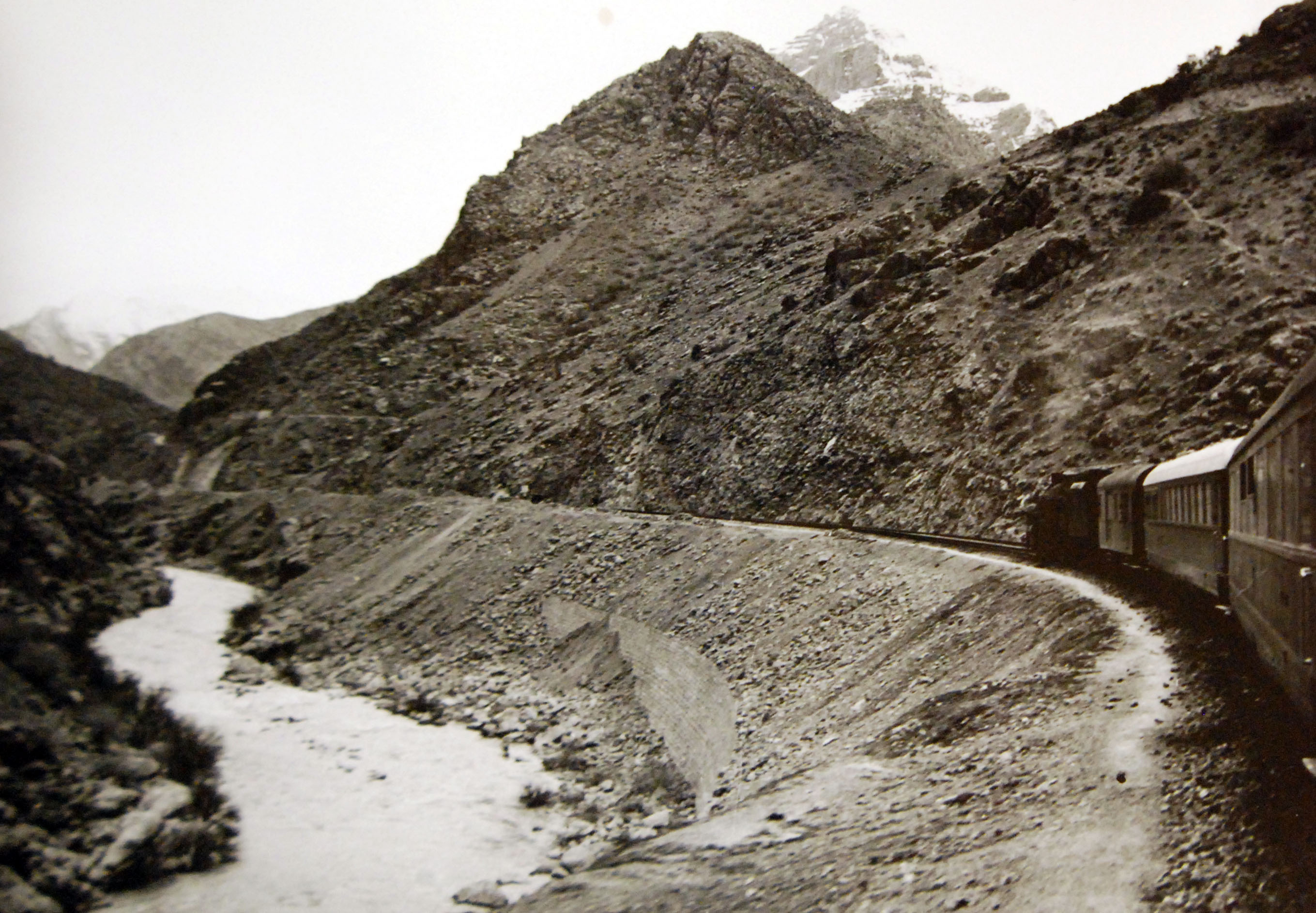
Train going along a gorge through a winding route somewhere in Iraq.

== See also ==
- History of Iran
- Mediterranean and Middle East theatre of World War II
- Military history of the Soviet Union
- Military history of Poland during World War II
- Anglo-Soviet invasion of Iran
- Anglo-Russian Convention
- Royal Road
- Operation Cedar
- Burma Road
