= Dekemhare =

Dekemhare ደቀምሓረ
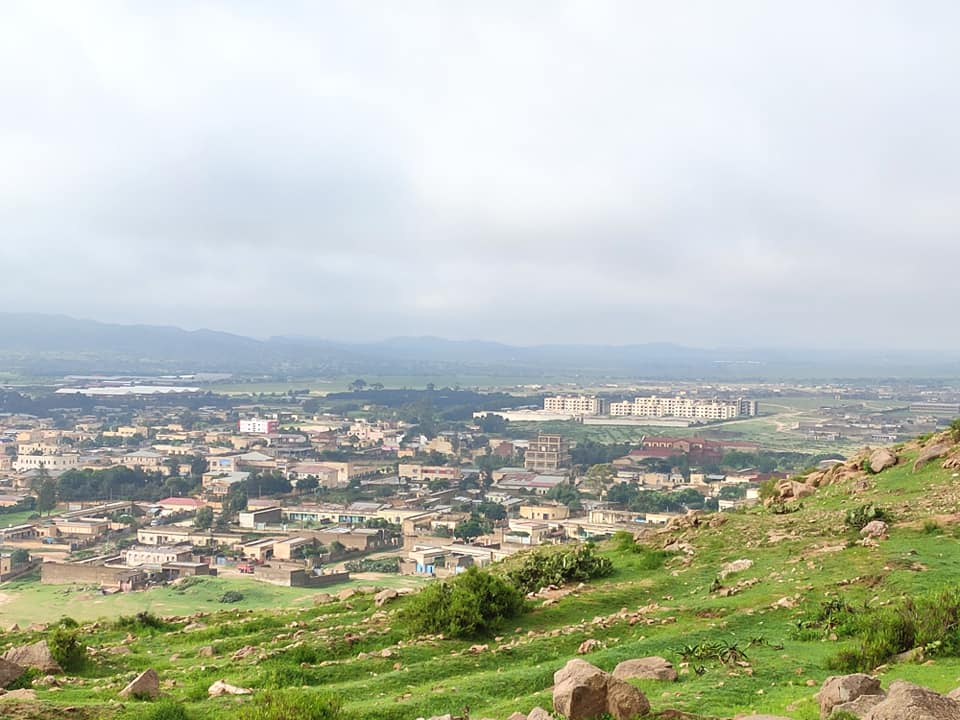

- Location in Eritrea
- Coordinates: 15°4′N 39°2′E
- Country: Eritrea
- Region: Debub
- District: Dekemhare District
- Elevation: 2,060 m (6,760 ft)

Population
  - Total: 120,000

Dekemhare (Tigrinya: ደቀምሓረ; sometimes spelled Decamare, Italian: Decamerè) is a town in Eritrea in the Southern Region, southeast of the national capital of Asmara. During the Italian colonial period, the town became a major center of industry and agriculture known for its vineyards. The town became known for Art Deco buildings built during the colonial period.

Prior to 1947, the town had a sizable population of Italian settlers. The city was partially destroyed in the Eritrean War of Independence.

== Geography ==
Villages around Dekemhare city are Metsalu (መጻሉ) Hadamu (ሃዳሙ), Amhur (ኣምሁር), Awlietseru(ኣውሊዕ ጸሩ) Gurae(ጉራዕ), Tukul (ቱኹል), Qeyhkor, (ቀይሕኮር), and Afelba, (ኣፈልባ).

Education Dekemhare has two major secondary schools: Dekemhare Secondary School and Faith Mission Secondary School. In addition, the town has several middle and primary schools. Technical and vocational education is also available, mainly provided by the Don Bosco Vocational Training Center.

== History ==
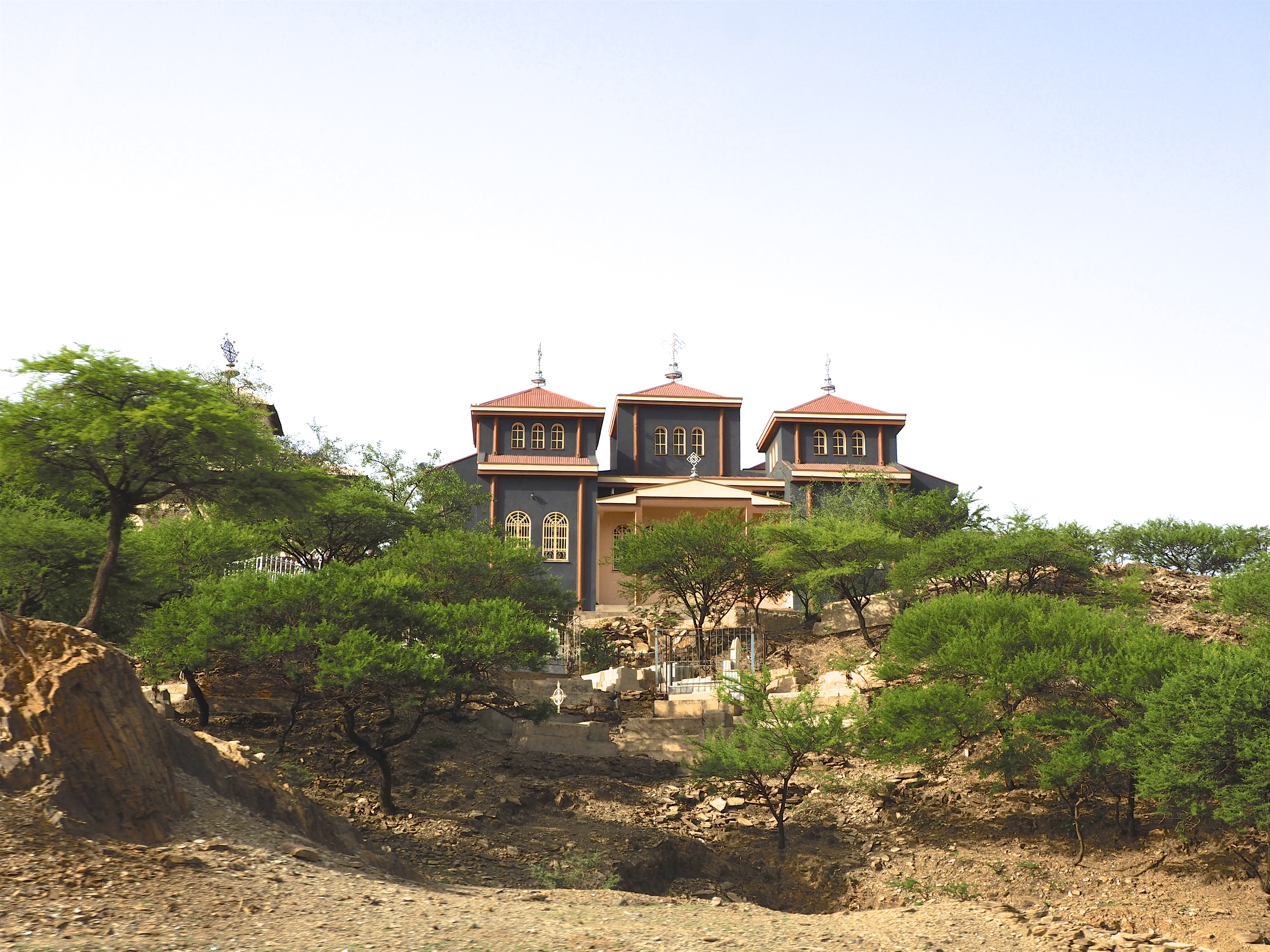
An Orthodox Church in Dekemhare

The settlement of Dequ-Mehari, now perched above the town of Dekemhare, was founded in the 15th century as a small-scale agricultural community. It was previously overshadowed by the nearby settlement of Gura, which was the location of several battles (including a major one during the 19th century Ethio-Egyptian War) and previously gave its name to Dequ-Mehari's valley.

=== Colonial era and World War II ===
Following their invasion, the Italians devoted significant resources into developing Gura and Dekemhare as an important transportation center. Gura received an air base and a major road was built connecting Dekamhare with the port Nefasit. The Italians built a number of contemporary services in the town. The town became a major base of operations for the Italian military in the war against Ethiopia.

The town became a key agricultural center for Italian East Africa, mainly with wine vineyards, but also pasta and bread factories. The Italian influence was significant and many buildings built between 1936 and 1938 display a distinctive Art Deco style. In 1938, the town had 12,000 residents, including 6,000 permanent Italian residents. The town was nicknamed "Little Rome".

During World War II, as the British took control over the region, many of the Italian residents left. Ethnic violence in 1947 resulted in most of rest of the Italian residents leaving Dekemhare. The industrial production of the city did not resume after the British turned over the region to Ethiopia in 1951, and there were persistent rumors that efforts by major international companies to build factories were stopped by the Haile Selassie government.

=== Eritrean War of Independence ===
During the Eritrean War of Independence (1961-1991), the town was the center of organizing and military action by the Eritrean Liberation Front (ELF). A site of early military actions between the ELF and the Ethiopian government, the town became controlled by rebel factions in 1977 who made it a primary organizing location.

However, the town became controlled by Ethiopian forces again when the now united Eritrean People's Liberation Front (EPLF) retreated from the territory. The town became a major location of violence during the remained of the wars including regular fighting between forces, aerial bombardment and shelling. Much of the population fled during the intense fighting in 1990 and 1991. On May 21, 1991, the EPLF took over Dekemhare which caused a disorganized retreat of Ethiopian troops and victory over Asmara and the end of large-scale military fighting.

== Modern history ==
In 2023, it was announced that African Development Fund (ADF) would assist the Eritrean government in constructing the country's first utility-scale solar plant in Dekemhare. It was reported in 2023 that the Eritrean government would take control of Don Bosco Technical School
