= Edward Ellsberg =

United States Navy officer and writer (1891–1983)

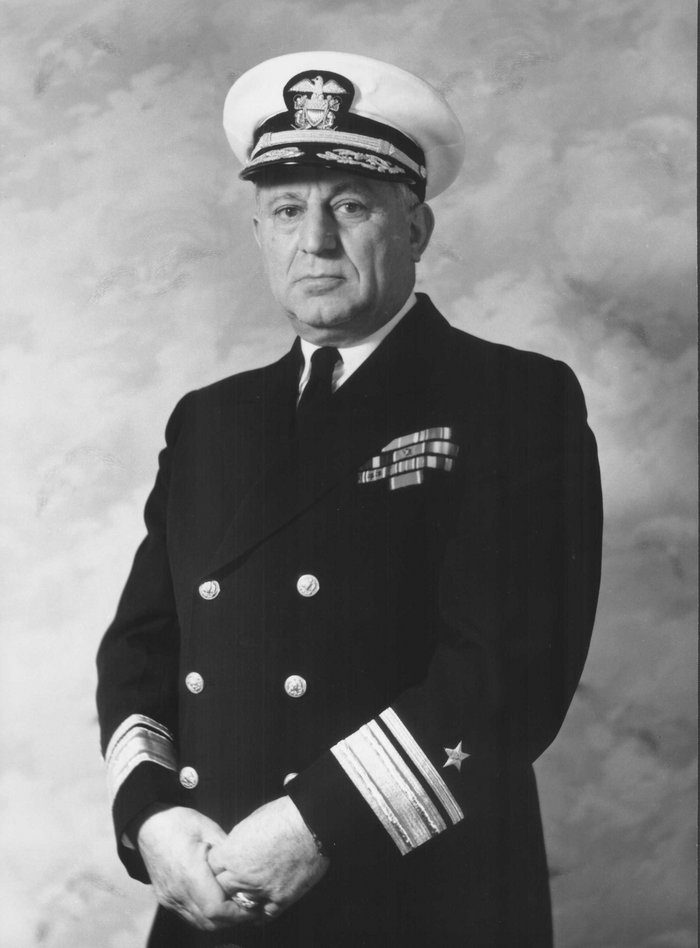
- Edward Ellsberg
- Born: November 21, 1891; New Haven, Connecticut, U.S.
- Died: January 24, 1983 (aged 91); Bryn Mawr, Pennsylvania, U.S.
- Burial place: Willimantic, Connecticut, U.S.
- Military career
- Allegiance: United States
- Branch: United States Navy
- Service years: 1914–1926, 1942–1951
- Rank: Rear admiral
- Nickname: "Commander Ellsberg"
- Unit: Principal Salvage Officer
- Conflicts: World War I World War II
- Awards: Navy Distinguished Service Medal; Legion of Merit (2); Order of the British Empire

Edward Ellsberg, OBE (November 21, 1891 – January 24, 1983) was an officer in the United States Navy and a popular author. He was widely known as "Commander Ellsberg".

== Early years ==
Ellsberg was born in New Haven, Connecticut, and grew up in Colorado. He was one of the very few Jews who were accepted into the United States Naval Academy, which graduated him with a Bachelor of Science degree in 1914. He earned his Master of Science degree from the Massachusetts Institute of Technology in 1920. He received an honorary Eng.D. from University of Colorado at Boulder in 1929.

== First service with the U.S. Navy ==
Ellsberg was commissioned in the navy in 1914 and served on active duty until 1926. He became an expert in undersea salvage and rescue. In 1926, he raised the navy submarine, S-51. For that success he was promoted to the rank of commander by an Act of Congress and awarded the Distinguished Service Medal by the Navy Department, since which time he has been popularly known as "Commander Ellsberg", regardless of his rank. Ellsberg described the raising of the S-51 in his 1929 book, On the Bottom.

On June 1, 1918, Ellsberg married Lucy Buck. In letters to her he signed his name as "Ned". Lucy Ellsberg bore their daughter Mary on 29 August 1921.

== Return to civilian status ==
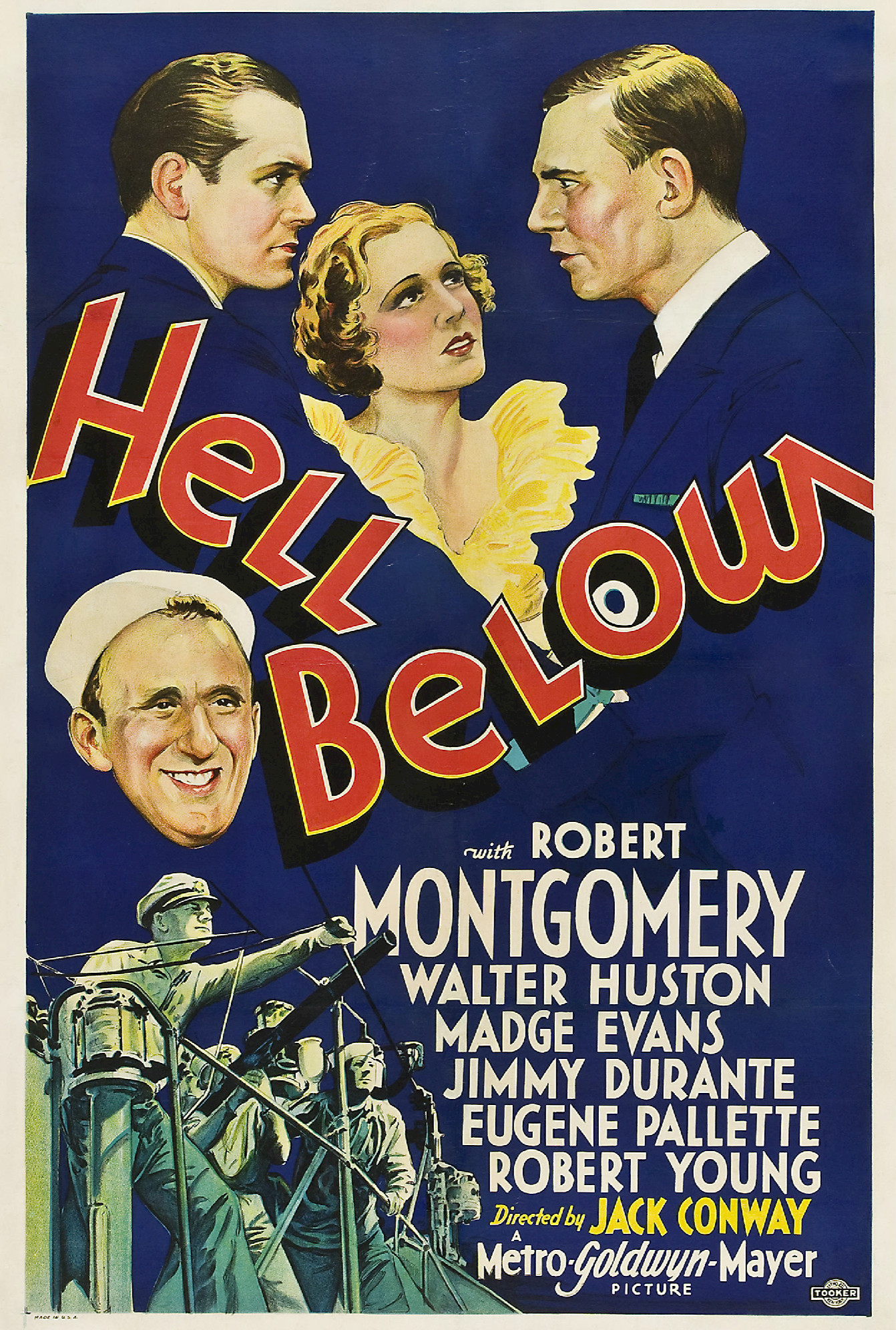
Poster for Hell Below (1933), adapted from Ellsberg's novel Pigboats

After leaving active duty, Ellsberg worked for the Tide Water Oil Company and began writing books about his exploits and about historical events.

In December 1927, Ellsberg volunteered for active duty to rescue survivors trapped in the sunken submarine S-4. The rescue efforts failed and Ellsberg returned home in early January 1928.

Ellsberg's 1931 book, Pigboats, inspired the 1933 movie, Hell Below, starring Robert Montgomery, Robert Young, Walter Huston, and Madge Evans.

His book Hell on Ice was adapted for an episode of Orson Welles's The Mercury Theatre on the Air that aired October 9, 1938, on CBS Radio. An adaptation was also presented on Welles's The Mercury Summer Theatre of the Air, broadcast August 9, 1946.

== World War II naval service ==
Immediately after the Japanese attack on Pearl Harbor, Ellsberg rejoined the navy. His first assignment was to conduct salvage operations at the newly liberated port of Massawa, Eritrea. Working in beastly heat with virtually no staff and poor administrative support, Ellsberg salvaged a large floating dry dock and several of the ships that had been sunk to block the harbor.

Ellsberg returned the port to operation and the ships salvaged were added to the Allies' merchant fleets. During his work in Massawa, Ellsberg reported to the Lend Lease coordinator in Cairo, Egypt, US Army Major General Russell Maxwell. Ellsberg renamed the SS Liebenfels, a large German freighter, salvaged and refitted at Massawa, the General Russell Maxwell. He described the salvage of the port of Massawa in his book Under the Red Sea Sun. Ellsberg was promoted to captain by presidential order on June 19, 1942. The next year he was awarded the Legion of Merit by U.S. President Franklin D. Roosevelt in honor of his salvage efforts in Massawa.

In Under the Red Sea Sun, Ellsberg complained that the American contractor that was assigned to give him administrative support was very unhelpful, but he did not name that company. The company, Johnson, Drake & Piper, itself claimed credit for clearing the port in the privately printed book, "Middle East War Projects of Johnson, Drake & Piper, Inc., for the Corps of Engineers, U.S. Army, 1942–1943" (New York: Johnson, Drake & Piper, Inc., 1943). That book contains photographs and drawings showing wartime projects around the Middle East.

From Massawa, Ellsberg went to North Africa to become Principal Salvage Officer in that theater. He worked under Admiral Andrew Cunningham, the British officer commanding naval forces in the area. Ellsberg's activities were detailed in his book No Banners, No Bugles.

Ellsberg, worn out from constant work, was ordered home in early 1943 to recuperate.

After a time inspecting ship construction activities, Ellsberg was sent to England in time for the Normandy Invasion, where he was instrumental in setting up the Mulberry harbour off the Normandy Beach. He also prepared 89 damaged or superannuated ships for scuttling to make artificial harbors. That operation gained him great admiration in Britain where he was appointed an honorary Officer of the Order of the British Empire (OBE). Ellsberg described his experiences in his book, The Far Shore.

== Retirement ==
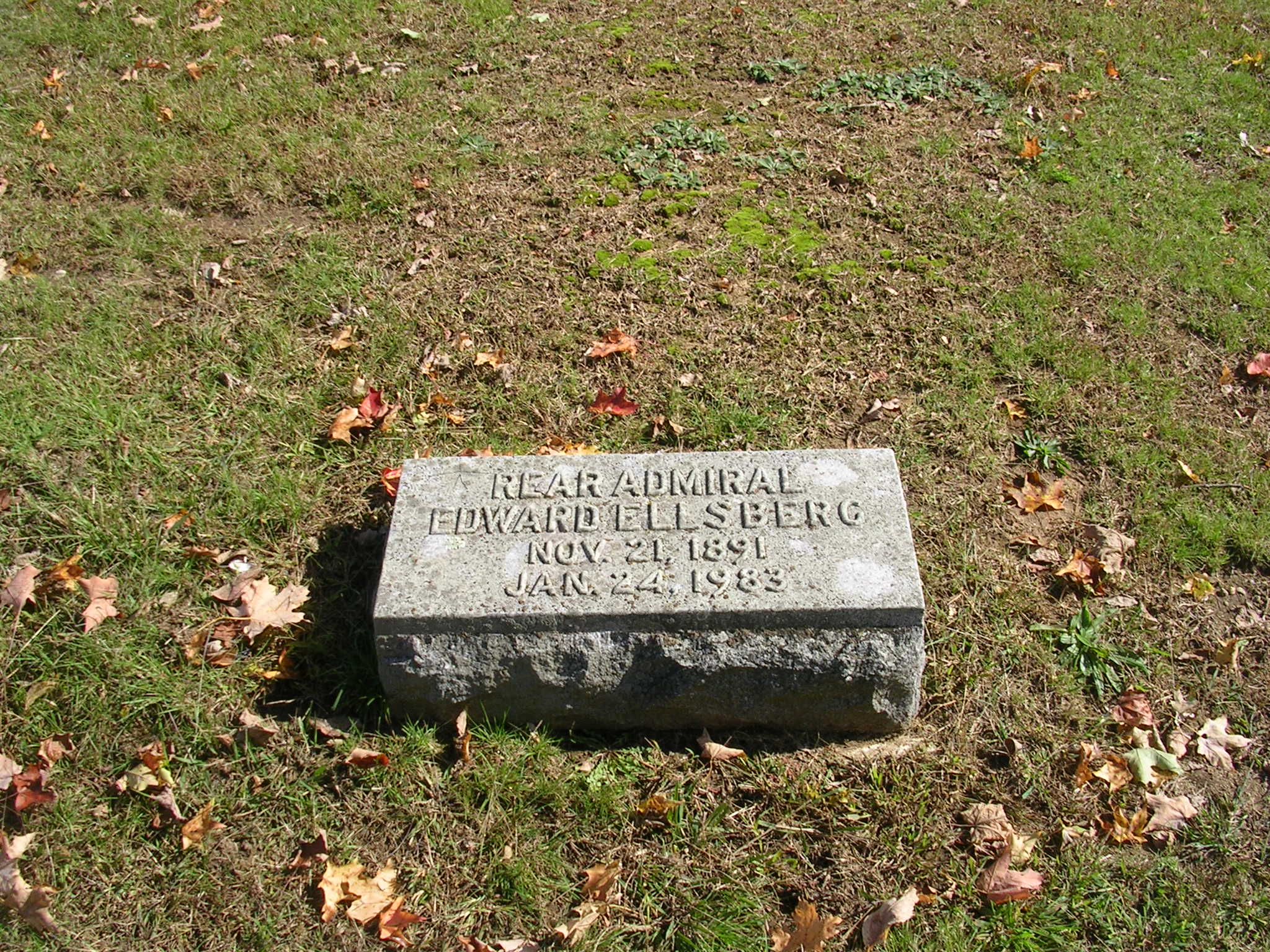
Gravesite of Rear Admiral Ellsberg – Willimantic, CT

He rose to the rank of rear admiral before he retired from active duty in 1951 to enjoy Maine and Florida with his wife of 33 years. He continued to write, to lecture, and to consult on engineering projects. He died in 1983 at the age of 91, and is buried in Willimantic, Connecticut.

== Decorations ==
Rear Admiral Ellsberg's ribbon bar:

1st Row	Navy Distinguished Service Medal		Legion of Merit with Gold Star
2nd Row	World War I Victory Medal	American Campaign Medal	European-African-Middle Eastern Campaign Medal with two service stars
3rd Row	World War II Victory Medal	Officer of the Order of the British Empire	Ecuador Order of Abdon Calderón, 1st Class

== Publications ==
Writing was an Ellsberg hobby. He wrote many articles and reports. His books include the following:

- Report on Salvage Operations: Submarine S-51. (Washington: US GPO, 1927)
- On the Bottom. (New York: Dodd, Mead, and Company, 1929)
- Thirty Fathoms Deep. Fiction, The first in a trilogy of salvaging gold from the Santa Cruz shipwreck, (New York: Dodd, Mead, and Company, 1930)
- Pigboats. (New York: Dodd, Mead, and Company, 1931)
  Adapted for the movie Hell Below (1933)
- S-54, Stories of the Sea. ( New York: Dodd, Mead, and Company, 1932)
- Ocean Gold. The second in a trilogy of salvaging gold from the Santa Cruz shipwreck, (New York: Dodd, Mead, and Company, 1935)
- Spanish Ingots. The third in a trilogy of salvaging gold from the Santa Cruz shipwreck, republished under the titles "Submarine Treasure" & "Treasure Below". (New York: Dodd, Mead, and Company, 1936)
- Hell on Ice: The Saga of the 'Jeannette'. (New York: Dodd, Mead, and Company, 1938)
  See the article on the USS Jeannette (1878)
- Men Under the Sea. (New York: Dodd, Mead, and Company, 1939)
- Treasure Below. (New York: Dodd, Mead, and Company, 1940)
- Captain Paul. (New York: Dodd, Mead, and Company, 1941)
- 'I Have Just Begun To Fight!' the Story of John Paul Jones. (New York: Dodd, Mead, and Company, 1942)
- Under the Red Sea Sun. (New York: Dodd, Mead, and Company, 1946)
- No Banners, No Bugles. (New York: Dodd, Mead, and Company, 1949)
- Cruise of the Jeannette, 1949, about the Jeannette Expedition
- Passport for Jennifer. (New York: Dodd, Mead, and Compney, 1952)
- Mid Watch, a Novel. (New York: Dodd, Mead, and Company, 1954)
- The Far Shore. (New York: Dodd, Mead, and Company, 1960)

== See related ==
- John Alden. Salvage man : Edward Ellsberg and the United States Navy. (Annapolis, MD: Naval Institute Press, 1998)
- "Ellsberg, Edward". The National Cyclopaedia of American Biography (1942). F:116–117.
- "Ellsberg, Edward 1891–". Contemporary Authors, 5–8 (First Revision):347–348. 1969.
- "Ellsberg, Edward 1891–". Something About the Author, 7:78–79. 1975.
- "Edward Ellsberg, Naval Salvage Expert, Dies" New York Times. January 26, 1983. Page 17.

== See also ==
- Marine salvage
