= Gura, Eritrea =

Gura ጉራዕ
- Settlement
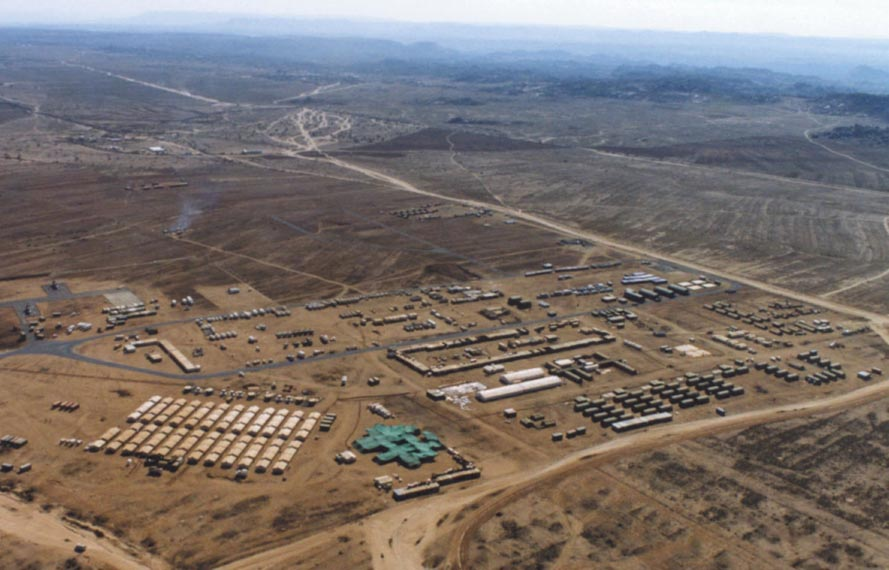
- The area around Gura

- Location in Eritrea
- Country: Eritrea
- Region: Debub
- Time zone: UTC+3 (EAT)

Gura (Tigrinya: ጉራዕ) or Gura'e is a settlement in Eritrea's Debub region in northeast Africa. It is located in the eponymous Gura Valley in the southeastern Eritrean Highlands. It is about 9 kilometers (5.6 mi) SE of Dekemhare and about 32 kilometres (20 mi) SSE of the capital Asmara.

== History ==
=== Early ===
Gura developed as a market at the present site from the 17th century AD. It stood across a caravan route linking northern Ethiopia with the port of Massawa on the Red Sea via the Alighede and Mareb rivers.

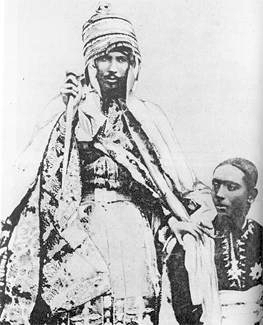
Emperor Yohannes IV, victor at Gura.

=== 19th century ===
During the 19th century Ethiopian-Egyptian War, Gura (and nearby Khaya Khor) was the site of two major Egyptian forts and, subsequently, a major Ethiopian victory over their inhabitants in 1876. The Egyptian commander Ratib Pasha intended to remain within the safety of the Gura fortress, but his American chief of staff Loring Pasha—the former Confederate Brig. Gen. William Loring—shamed him into direct confrontation with the main Ethiopian force by crying "No! March out of them! You are afraid!" (Discharged and returned to America, Loring would subsequently point his finger at the Egyptians for the loss in A Confederate Soldier in Egypt, simultaneously complaining of commander Osman Pasha's refusal to leave the second fort and explaining Ratib Pasha's having left the safety of his own because "what little judgment [he] possessed was entirely crushed by abject fear".) The subsequent rout from March 7 to 9 ended Egyptian hegemony over Eritrea and the Red Sea littoral and left open the possibility that the French would be able to colonize the entire region and endanger British routes through the Suez Canal.

Following Britain's complete occupation of Egypt and the rising of the Mahdi in the Sudan, the Egyptian fort at Gura was among those detailed in the 1884 tripartite Hewett Treaty. The treaty, signed at Adwa and ratified by Queen Victoria, obliged Ethiopia to oversee the evacuation of exposed Egyptian garrisons in Eritrea and the southern Sudan through the port of Massawa in exchange for the garrisons' supplies of arms and ammunition, recognition of their sovereignty over the Bogos lands—essentially, the highlands of modern Eritrea, which the Ethiopians organized as Hamasien—and other concessions. During this period, Gura served as Ras Alula's capital of the Ethiopian province of Hamasien prior to his removal to Asmara. Once Ethiopia had made good on its part of the bargain, however, Britain's concern over France's rapid expansion of its colony in the Bay of Tadjoura (today's Djibouti) led it to openly support Italy's bloodless occupation of Massawa and establishment of Italian Eritrea in the former Egyptian lands. Gura was occupied by the Italian-allied Bahta Hagos in 1889. The Battle of Adwa ending the First Italo-Ethiopian War kept it from annexing the entirety of Ethiopia but it continued to hold Gura and other towns in the former Egyptian highlands.

=== 20th century ===
Under the Italian protectorate, Gura was left undeveloped until Benito Mussolini began to build up the Italian military presence in preparation for the second Italian invasion of Ethiopia. Much of the former town was removed to establish a military base, which served as the main airfield for the northern front of the war. As such, the base was heavily involved in the Italian use of airborne chemical weapons such as mustard gas during the conflict.

During the first months of WW2, the airfield was used by the Italians to successfully attack the British Sudan and to occupy Kassala.

Once captured by Allied forces during World War II's East African Campaign, it hosted a Royal Air Force (RAF) support base and an Australian field hospital. As an adjunct to the Lend-Lease Act, a secret expansion of the base —Project 19— was established with the US government.

==== Italian bombing mission in 1943 ====
In 1943, two SM.75 GA aircraft undertook a bombing mission, the only one made by an SM.75, intended to destroy American bombers stored at an airbase in Gura. To reach the objective, which was over 3,000 kilometers (1,900 mi) away, the two S.75 GAs—with civil registration I-BUBA and I-TAMO, but renominated with serial numbers MM.60539 and MM.60543, respectively, for military use—were laden heavily with 11,000 kilograms (24,000 pounds) of fuel, and modified by fitting a "Jozza" bomb-aiming system and a bomb bay capable of carrying 1,200 kilograms (2,600 pounds) of bombs. The most experienced crews were selected for the mission, led by officers named Villa and Peroli.

The mission started at 06:30 hours on 23 May 1943 from Rhodes, the easternmost Regia Aeronautica base at the time. Each of the two aircraft, weighing 10,200 kilograms (22,500 pounds) empty, had a takeoff-weight of 24,000 kilograms (53,000 pounds). The SM.75 GA's engines were optimized for endurance and economy rather than for power, which made the takeoff difficult with the heavy load of fuel and bombs. Initially flying at low altitude, at 10:00 hours the modified SM.75 GAs climbed to 3,000 meters (9,800 feet). Having used an excessive amount of fuel, Peroli diverted to bomb Port Sudan instead; he returned safely to Rhodes at 05:30 hours on 24 May 1943 after 23 hours in the air. Villa, meanwhile, pressed on alone and arrived over the Gura airbase—which was heavily defended despite being well behind the front line—at 18:45 hours and released his bombs. Although one bomb failed to drop and remained on board, presenting the threat of an explosion, Villa's mission was successful, and his aircraft returned to Rhodes safely one hour and 15 minutes after Peroli, landing at 06:45 hours on 24 May 1943, having covered 6,600 kilometers (4,100 mi) over a period of 24 hours and 15 minutes.

== Late developments ==
Since early 1943, the airport was used mainly for maintenance and repairing of American aircraft, shipped directly from the American continent in order to support the Allies in Europe.

Furthermore, it was established a huge airbase maintained by 2,000 American employees of Johnson, Drake & Piper, along with an equal number of hired or conscripted Italians and Eritreans. The facility—operated by employees of Douglas Aircraft—received damaged RAF aircraft which were sailed down the Red Sea to Massawa and transported overland, and repaired them for return to the North African front under their own power. The American facility boasted a nine-hole golf course with the following rules:

Balls may be lifted from bomb craters and trenches without penalty.
Do not touch bombs or craters, notify authorities.
In case of air raid the trenches are located in back of 5th and 7th greens.
Out of bounds to right of 1st, 5th and 9th holes.
If baboon steals ball drop another ball no nearer hole—no penalty.
If ball hits an animal play ball as it lies.

At war's end, Eritrea was incorporated into Haile Selassie's restored Ethiopia. British administrators had already dismantled Gura's air base, leaving only the tarmac. Lacking an airport and now off the main lines of transport and communication, the community has been overshadowed by nearby Dekemhare. As a Cold War ally of the United States, however, Imperial Ethiopia was able to host American reconnaissance aircraft at the site during the onset of violent Eritrean separatism. The operation ceased with the overthrow of the empire by the Communist Derg in the 1970s, switching Ethiopia's side in the Cold War.

While the Eritrean People's Liberation Front (EPLF) proved increasing successful and began to control most of the present country, the Derg continued to hold areas of the highlands and, after their defeat in the Second Battle of Massawa in 1990, continued to use napalm and cluster bombs against the city. The end of the conflict and recognition from Addis Ababa was secured by the EPLF's victory in a major tank battle in the valley around Gura on May 20, 1991.
