= Under the Red Sea Sun =

1946 book by Edward Ellsberg

- First edition
- Author: Edward Ellsberg
- Publication date: 1946

Under the Red Sea Sun (New York: Dodd, Mead & Company, 1946) is a book by Edward Ellsberg describing salvage operations of the many ships scuttled by the Italians to block the port of Massawa on the Red Sea coast of Eritrea during World War II. Massawa's excellent harbor was vital first to the Italian then to the British war effort.

Ellsberg, a skilled writer, described how a small group of workers under his direction accomplished an almost Herculean task with virtually no resources. Much of the story is an entertaining account of the bureaucratic politics of working in a remote backwater far from support and assistance.

Ellsberg paints a realistic picture of confusion and incompetence in the early days of the war. He was particularly caustic about the American civilian contractor building facilities at Ghinda and Asmara, where it was much cooler than at Massawa but was too far away for the facilities to ever be used by harbor personnel. The company, Johnson, Drake & Piper, Inc., itself claimed credit for clearing the port in the privately printed book, "Middle East War Projects of Johnson, Drake & Piper, Inc., for the Corps of Engineers, U.S. Army, 1942–1943" (New York: Johnson, Drake & Piper, Inc., 1943). That book contains beautiful photographs and drawings showing projects around the Middle East.

== Quotation ==
Ellsberg, who had vast technical knowledge and experience, described experts as "...people who know so much about how things have been done in the past that they are usually blind to how they can be done in the future."

== Reviews ==
- Atlantic 178:172. December 1946.
- Booklist 43:84. November 15, 1946.
- Christian Science Monitor, November 15, 1946. p. 16.
- New York Times November 3, 1946. p. 5.
- New Yorker 22:65. December 28, 1946.
- San Francisco Chronicle, November 12, 1946. p. 16.
- Saturday Review 29:14. November 16, 1946.

== The book as inspiration ==
The story of Ellsberg's heroic effort inspired Eurobank's Polish division (Eurobank Poland) to create a corporate project management training program called Massawa Training, which in 2007 won the PMI Award in its category.
