= Gog (woreda) =

District in Gambela Region, Ethiopia

- Woreda
- Location within Ethiopia Location within Africa
- Coordinates: 7°34′N 34°30′E
- Country: Ethiopia
- Region: Gambela

Population (2017)
  - Woreda: 17,456
  - Urban: 6,039 (34.60%)
  - Rural: 11,417 (65.40%)

Gog is a woreda in Gambela Region, Ethiopia. Part of the Anuak Zone, Gog is bordered on the south by Dimma, on the southwest by the Akobo River which separates it from South Sudan, on the west by Jor, and on the north by Abobo. The major town in Gog is Pinyudo.

The terrain of Gog is predominantly flat, with the elevation ranging between 400 and 600 meters above sea level; high points include Mount Masango (552 meters). Major bodies of water in this woreda include the Gilo River and Lake Tata. According to the Atlas of the Ethiopian Rural Economy published by the Central Statistical Agency (CSA), around 30% of the woreda is forest. A notable landmark is the Gambela National Park, which occupies the land west of the Pinyudo - Gambela road.

The economy of Gog is predominantly agricultural. There are no agricultural cooperatives, and little other infrastructure. While there are roads in this woreda, details about them are not available.

== History ==
At the start of the Federal Democratic Republic of Ethiopia, Gog was part of the Administrative Zone 2; however between 2001 and 2007 the Zone was reorganized and Gog became part of the Anuak Zone. At some point between the 1994 national census and the 2001 Sample Agricultural Enumeration, Dimma was split from Gog.

In September 1989, Sudan People's Liberation Army (SPLA) forces attacked the rich Anuak agricultural village of Pinyudo and burned it down, killing 120 people, including women and children who had been burned to death in their tukuls, which had been locked from the outside by SPLA soldiers. The SPLA claimed that the villagers had planned to rob the refugee camp. This led to a clash between the SPLA and Anuak militia in the village of Akada in Itang.

== Demographics ==
Based on the 2007 Census conducted by the Central Statistical Agency of Ethiopia (CSA), this woreda has a total population of 16,836, of whom 7,751 are men and 9,085 women; with an area of 3,250.25 square kilometers, Gog has a population density of 5.18, which is greater than the Zone average of 4.83 persons per square kilometer. Reportedly 5,617 or 33.36% are urban inhabitants. A total of 3,633 households were counted in this woreda, which results in an average of 4.6 persons to a household, and 3,450 housing units. The majority of the inhabitants said they were Protestant, with 77.52% of the population reporting they observed this belief, while 15.08% of the population practised Ethiopian Orthodox Christianity, 2.6% were Catholic, and 1.82% practiced traditional religions.

There is a refugee camp in Pinyudo with 29,912 refugees from South Sudan.

According to the 1994 national census, the woreda's population was reported to be 15,133 in 2,818 households, of whom 6,969 were men and 8,164 women; 1,647 or 10.88% of the population were urban inhabitants. (This total also includes an estimate for two kebeles which were not counted; these were estimated to have 2,696 inhabitants, of whom 1,229 were men and 1,467 women.) The four largest ethnic groups in Gog were the Anuak (95.59%), the Amhara (1.17%), the Oromo (1.11%), and the Mezhenger (1.01%); all other ethnic groups made up 1.13% of the population. Anuak is spoken as a first language by 95.67%, 1.16% Oromiffa, 1.09% Amharic, and 1.01% speak Majang; the remaining 1.11% spoke all other primary languages reported. The largest group of the inhabitants said they were Protestant, with 39.58% of the population reporting they practiced that belief, while 17.29% professed Ethiopian Orthodox Christianity, 4.96% practiced traditional religions, and 4.95% were Catholic.
