= Abobo (woreda) =

District in Gambela Region, Ethiopia

Coordinates: 7°50′N 34°30′E

Abwobo (Amharic: አቦቦ)(Abwom-Gilo Wara-Laaw) is a woreda in Gambela Region, Ethiopia. Part of the Anywaa Zone, Abwobo is bordered on the southeast by the Majang Zone, on the south by Gog, on the southwest by Jor, on the northwest by Itang special woreda, on the north by Gambela Zuria, and on the northeast by the Oromia Region; part of its northern boundary is defined by the Alworo River. The major town in Abwobo is Abwobo.

== Overview ==
The terrain of Abwobo is dominated by comparatively high ground extending on a southeast-northwest axis; the elevations range 400 – 600 meters above sea level. Major bodies of water in this woreda include Lake Alworo. According to the Atlas of the Ethiopian Rural Economy published by the Central Statistical Agency (CSA), around 20% of the woreda is forest. A notable landmark is the Gambela National Park, which occupies the land west of the Pinyudo - Gambela road.

The economy of Abwobo is predominantly agricultural. Estimated road density is reported to be between 5.1 and 10 kilometers per 1000 square kilometers.

At the start of the Federal Democratic Republic of Ethiopia, Abwobo was part of the Administrative Zone 2; however between 2001 and 2007 the Zone was reorganized and this woreda became part of the Anywaa Zone.

== Abwobo Administrators ==
Abwobo’s Woreda Administrators from 1991– to the present.

- David Aballa (GPLM) 1991 – 1997
- Omot Othow (Prosperity Party ) October 2018 – present

== Abwobo Royal Kingdom ==
It began with King Gora who divided his three crowned sons Apïr (Giilø), Olwiith, and King Odiel into two clans Tuung-Nyudöla, and Tuung-Gööc.

Apïr (Giilø), and Olwiith become a clan of 'Tuung-Nyudöla’ and their descendant. King Odiel became the clan of 'Tuung-Gööc' and the descendant.

Quick Facts:

King Kwot who explores Abwobo is a descendant of King Odiel from the 'Tuung-Gööc' clan. He was responsible for bringing Dinka/Ajwiel from S. Sudan to Abwobo land and created a Clan called “Tuung-Jo-Waad-Jayo”, “Ajang-Jure-Kwot”, “Nyujang’, to present. He was succeeded by his son King Ngenyo Kwot followed by Revolutionary King Odiel Ngenyo (Wenyi-Julla) who crowned his three sons and one grandson.

- King Gilo Odiel Ngenyo “Wara-Laaw” of Abobo mainland who survived by his son Prince Ojwanga Gilo a veteran and a hero of during Korean war (1950-1953).

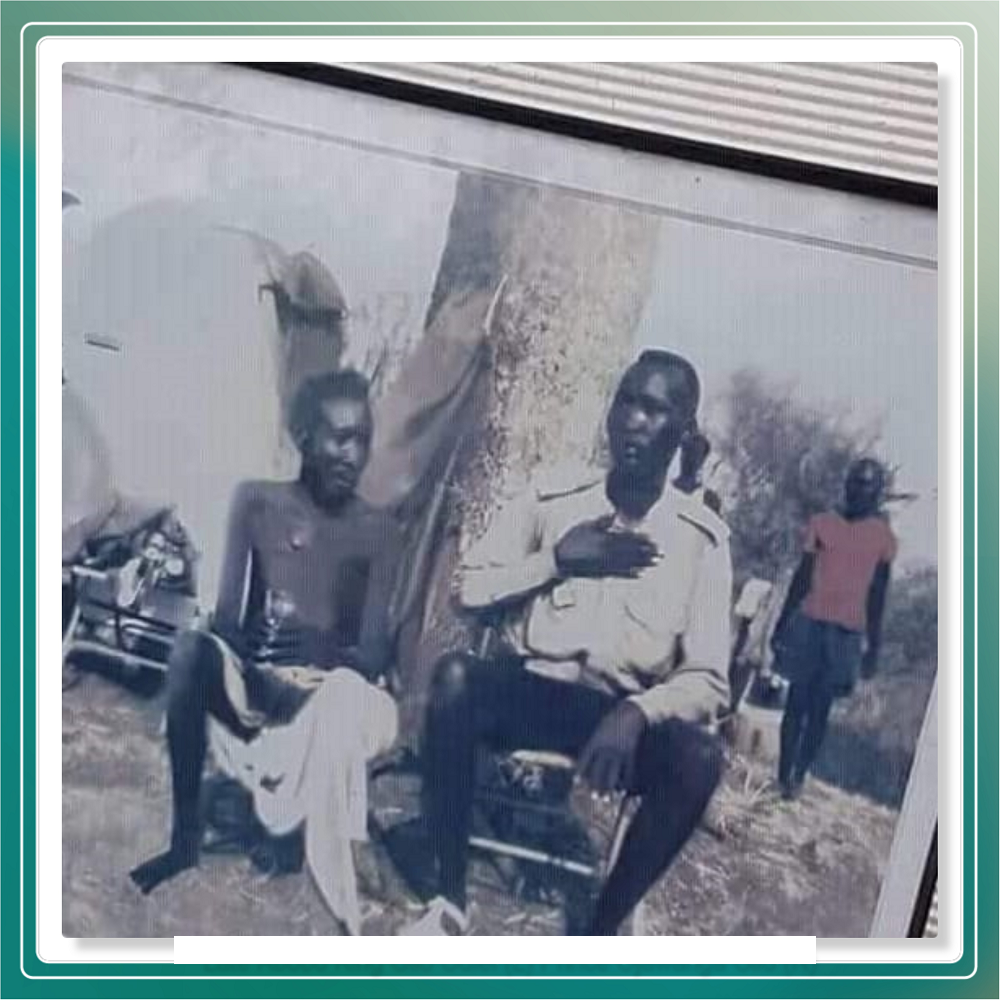

- King Ojulu Odiel Ngenyo “Wara-Agoro” of Chubo-kirr (Donyingree), was a diplomat and representative of the Ethiopian parliament during Emperor Haile Selassie's regime. He was one of the rulers who invited highlanders in Anywaa’s land mainly from Walaga and Ilubabor then, now the Oromia region for the purpose of Buffalo hunting for Oromo traditional custom horns and skin for marriage and souvenirs. In return, many Anywaas went to the Oromia region during the summer and winter seasons seeking jobs for coffee plantations and harvest. King Ojulu Odiel was succeeded by his son late King Abulla Ojulu Odiel “Wara- Awaitty” who died from stress sometime shortly after the Derg regime deposed Emperor Haile Salassie in 1974 due to physical, emotional and physiological abuse from Derg cadres. He is survived by his son Elder Prince Didumo Abulla Ojulu a veteran and retired Gambella regional health expert and his daughter Princess Ajulu aka “Admittee” Abulla Ojulu who now lives in Minnesota, USA.

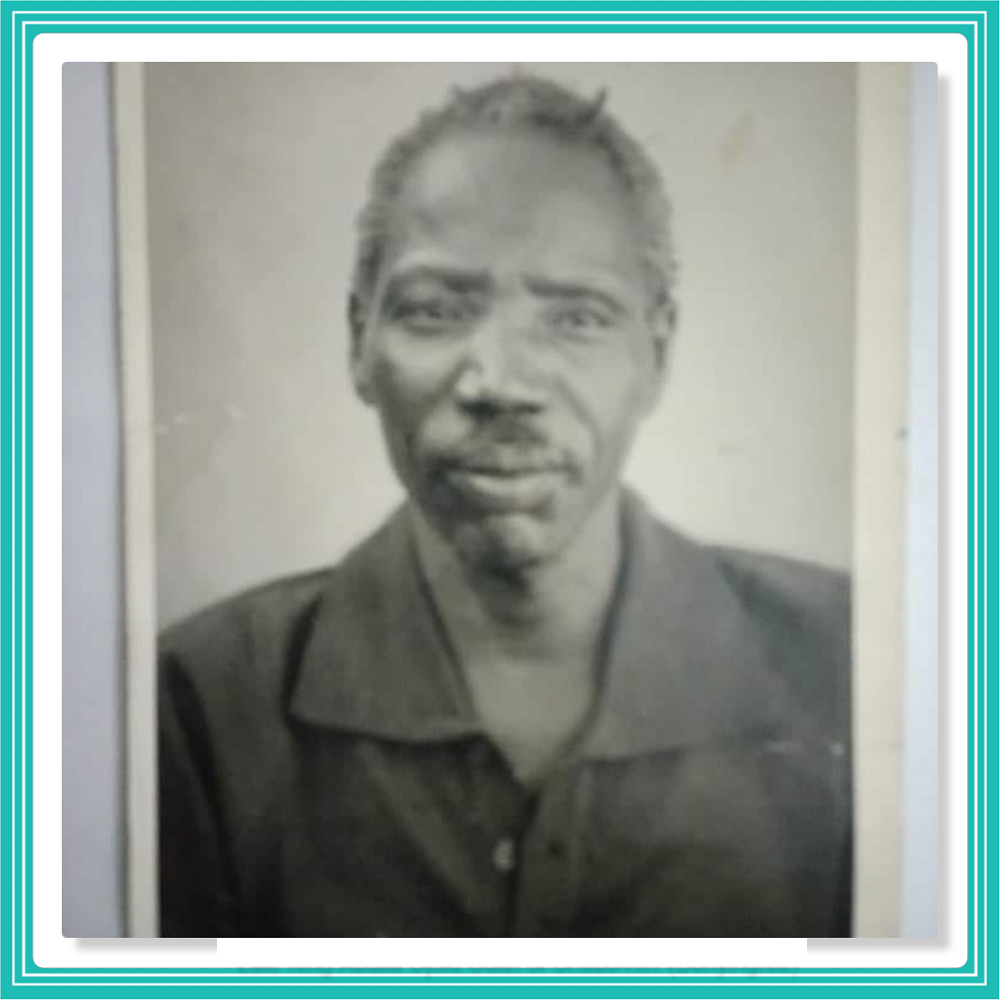

- King Ogud Odiel Ngenyo “Winyi-Ghoche-kwaory” of Eathow-Rummo/ Abawirry/ he survived by his son Prince Abacwane Ogud Odiel who was born on April 01, 1953, and he died on October 21, 2003, at age 50. Abachwane Ogud Odiel lived in the USA for many years got sick returned home to the Gambella region and died shortly after long battling Parkinson's disease. He was a chairperson and co-founder of GPLM (Gambella People's Liberation Movement).

== King Gilo Odiel Lion's ==
The lion named “Gilo”, was a gift from the people of Gambella region of Ethiopia to Emperor Haile Selassie by the King Gilo Odiel ( Gilo Wara-Law) of Abobo in 1951. Lion Gilo was named after King Gilo Odiel by His Majesty Haile Selassie. After its death, Gilo was stuffed and mounted and currently on display at the Ethnological Museum in Addis Ababa university.

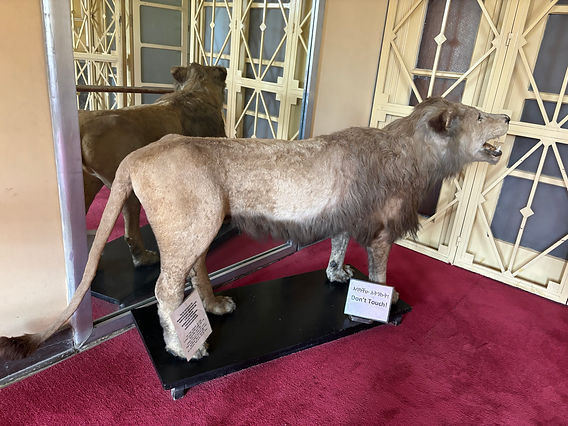

== Administrative kebeles ==
Abwobo has about 21 kebeles, and 6 of them are the homes of resettlers. The following are the lists of the kebeles in Abwobo woreda.

=== List ===
- Tegni Kebele
- Pokedi Kebele
- Dumbang Kebele
- Perbongo Kebele
- Chubo Mender 8/9 Kebele
- Chubo Mender 13 (Abowd) Kebele
- Chubo Mender 11/12 Kebele
- Chubo Mender 14 Kebele
- Chubo-Kirr (Donyingree) Kebele
- Chubo Kebele
- Abaaru Kebele
- Okuna- Piinø Kebele
- Okuna-Kijang Kebele
- Okuna-Kidöyï Kebele
- Guracay (Guura caaï) Kebele
- Tierkudhi Kebele (Gothok Village)
- Tier Chiru Kebele
- Lungnga Kebele
- Iidhuoremo (Iidhu rïïmö) Kebele
- Tierdanga Kebele
- Ochokchala Kebele

== Demographics ==
Based on the 2007 Census conducted by the CSA, this woreda has a total population of 15,741, an increase of 12.65% over the 1994 census, of whom 8,184 are men and 7,557 women; with an area of 3,116.17 square kilometers, Abwobo has a population density of 5.05, which is greater than the Zone average of 4.83 persons per square kilometer. The census reported 4,090 or 25.98% are urban inhabitants. A total of 3,867 households were counted in this woreda, which results in an average of 4.1 persons per household, and 3,663 housing units. The majority of the inhabitants said they were Protestant, with 71.41% of the population reporting they observed this belief, while 10.77% were Catholic, 9.98% of the population practiced Ethiopian Orthodox Christianity, and 6.12% were Muslim.

According to the 1994 national census, the woreda's population was reported to be 13,973 in 3,597 households, of whom 7,223 were men and 6,750 women; 1,222 or 8.75% of the population were urban inhabitants. The five largest ethnic groups in Abwobo were the Anywaa people (44.05%), the Kambaata (20.1%), the Amhara (12.57%), the Oromo (6.31%), and the Majang (5.99%); all other ethnic groups made up 10.98% of the population. Dha-Anywaa is spoken as a first language by 44.08%, 20.45% speak Kambaata, 13.5% Amharic, 5.93% Majang, and 5.65% speak Oromiffa; the remaining 10.39% spoke all other primary languages reported. The largest group of the inhabitants said they were Protestant, with 32.2% of the population reporting they practiced that belief, while 29.66% professed Ethiopian Orthodox Christianity, 16.01% practiced traditional religions, 13.71% were Muslim, and 6.46% were Catholic.
