= Jikawo =

District in Gambela Region, Ethiopia

Coordinates: 8°15′N 33°50′E

'Jikow (Ji̱ekɔ̱w) is a woreda in Gambela Region, Ethiopia. Part of the Nuer Zone, Jikow is bordered on the south by the Anuak Zone, on the west by the Alwero River which separates it from Wanthoa, on the north by the Baro River which separates it from South Sudan, and on the east by Lare. Towns in Jikow include Kuachthiang and Teluth.

== Overview ==
The terrain in Jikow consists of marshes and grasslands; elevations range from 420 to 430 meters above sea level. According to the Atlas of the Ethiopian Rural Economy published by the Central Statistical Agency (CSA), around 10% of the woreda is forest. A notable landmark in Jikaw is Gambela National Park, which occupies an area south of the Baro on the eastern side of the woreda, covering about a third of its area.

The economy of Jikow is predominantly agricultural. There are no agricultural cooperatives, no documented roads, and little other infrastructure. Along with Akobo, Jikow becomes flooded during the rainy season, requiring the people to migrate to the highlands with their cattle until the waters recede; thus raising livestock is the primary source of income in this woreda.

== History ==
At the start of the Federal Democratic Republic of Ethiopia, Jikow was part of the Administrative Zone 3; however at some point before 2001, that Zone was abolished and Jikaw made part of Administrative Zone 1. Subsequently, between 2001 and 2007, Jikow became part of the Nuer Zone. Prior to 2007, the eastern kebeles were split from this woreda to create Lare.

On 14–15 April 2006, members of the Murle attacked the Pal Buol (also called the Lare) in Jikaw, and 16 people were killed and 9 wounded. The attackers stole more than 500 head of cattle. A week later, the Murle made another raid in Jikow, on Ngor village, in which 27 Nuer were killed and about 39 wounded, while 11 Murle were killed in the fighting.

== Demographics ==
Based on the 2007 Census conducted by the Central Statistical Agency of Ethiopia (CSA), this woreda has a total population of 35,556, of whom 19,134 are men and 16,422 women; with an area of 1,081.04 square kilometers, Jikow has a population density of 32.89, which is greater than the Zone average of 23.79 persons per square kilometer. While 2,261 or 6.36% are urban inhabitants, a further 2,314 or 6.51% are pastoralists. A total of 5,864 households were counted in this woreda, which results in an average of 6.1 persons per household, and 5,723 housing units. The majority of the inhabitants said they were Protestant, with 84.11% of the population reporting they observed this belief, while 9.08% practiced traditional religions, 4.48% were Catholic, and 1.71% of the population practised Ethiopian Orthodox Christianity.

According to the 1994 national census, the woreda's population was reported to be 42,925 in 7,746 households, of whom 22,260 were men and 20,665 women; 769 or 1.79% of the population were urban inhabitants. The two largest ethnic groups in Jikawo were the Nuer (97.96%), and the Anuak (1.97%); all other ethnic groups made up 0.07% of the population. Nuer is spoken as a first language by 98.08%, and Anuak by 1.88%; the remaining 0.04% spoke all other primary languages reported. The majority of the inhabitants said they were Protestant, with 56.25% of the population reporting they held that belief, while 19.04% practiced traditional religions, and 4.37% professed Ethiopian Orthodox Christianity.
