= Akobo (woreda) =

District in Gambela Region, Ethiopia

- Woreda
- Location within Ethiopia
- Coordinates: 8°0′N 33°30′E
- Country: Ethiopia
- Region: Gambela

Akobo is a woreda in Gambela Region, Ethiopia. It is named after the Akobo River, which flows westwards then north into the Baro River, defining its border with South Sudan. Part of the Nuer Zone, Akobo is bordered on the south and west by South Sudan, on the north by Wentawo, and on the east by the Anuak Zone. The westernmost point of this woreda is the westernmost point of Ethiopia. Towns in Akobo include Tergol.

== Overview ==
The terrain in Akobo is predominantly swampy, with few distinguishing high points; elevations range around 410 meters above sea level. Rivers include the Gilo River. According to the Atlas of the Ethiopian Rural Economy published by the Central Statistical Agency (CSA), around 10% of the woreda is forest.

The economy of Akobo is predominantly agricultural. There are no agricultural cooperatives, no documented roads, and little other infrastructure. Along with Jekow, Akobo becomes flooded during the rainy season, requiring the people to migrate to the highlands with their cattle until the waters recede; thus raising livestock is the primary source of income in this woreda.

== History ==
At the start of the Federal Democratic Republic of Ethiopia, Akobo was part of the Administrative Zone 3; however at some point before 2001, that Zone was abolished and Akobo made part of Administrative Zone 2. Akobo was captured by the Ethiopian Unity Patriots Front rebel group in 2000, and remained under its control until at least 2004. Subsequently, between 2001 and 2007, Akobo became part of the Nuer Zone. Prior to 2007, the northern kebeles were split from this woreda to create Wantawo and some eastern kebeles were added to Jor.

The Baro River entered flood stage 23 August 2006, drowning two people and displacing over 6,000 people in Akobo and adjacent woredas. Authorities were concerned about foot-and-mouth disease afflicting the local livestock following the flooding, as well as epidemics of malaria.

== Demographics ==
Based on the 2007 Census conducted by the CSA, this woreda has a total population of 24,674, of whom 14,273 are men and 10,401 women; with an area of 2,080.34 square kilometers, Akobo has a population density of 11.86 which is less than the Zone average of 23.79 persons per square kilometer. While 605 or 2.45% are urban inhabitants, a further 4 persons are pastoralists. A total of 4,446 households were counted in this Zone, which results in an average of 5.5 persons to a household, and 4,211 housing units. The majority of the inhabitants said they were Protestant, with 94.76% of the population reporting they observed this belief, and 3.36% were Catholic.

According to the 1994 national census, the woreda's population was reported to be 25,299 in 1,942 households, of whom 12,547 were men and 12,752 women; 244 or 0.96% of the population were urban inhabitants. (This total also includes an estimate for nine kebeles, which were not counted; they were estimated to have 13,903 inhabitants, of whom 6,637 were men and 7,266 women.) The largest ethnic group in Akobo was the Nuer (99.94%), and Nuer was spoken as a first language by 99.94% of the interviewed inhabitants. The majority of the inhabitants said they were Protestant, with 96.67% of the population reporting they held that belief, while 1.46% professed Ethiopian Orthodox Christianity.
