= Gambela Zuria =

Former district in Gambela Region, Ethiopia

Coordinates: 8°10′N 34°40′E

Gambela Zuria was a woreda in the Gambela Region of Ethiopia. Part of the Anuak Zone, Gambela Zuria is bordered on the south by Abobo, on the west by Itang special woreda, and on the north and east by the Oromia Region. Gambela, which is the capital of the Region, is surrounded by this woreda.

Elevations in Gambela range 400–600 meters above sea level; the high point is Mount Mesengo den Ch'aka. Rivers include the Baro. According to the Atlas of the Ethiopian Rural Economy published by the Central Statistical Agency (CSA), around 20% of the woreda is forest. A notable landmark is the Gambela National Park, which covers the woreda south of the Baro and west of the Gambela - Fugnido road.

Although Gambela Zuria is the most economically developed woreda in the Region, its economy is predominantly agricultural; however, there are no agricultural cooperatives. The estimated road density is reported to be between 20.1 and 30 kilometers per 1000 square kilometers.

== History ==
At the start of the Federal Democratic Republic of Ethiopia, Gambela was part of the Administrative Zone 1; however between 2001 and 2007 the Zone was reorganized and Gambela became part of the Anuak Zone.

In early December 2003, the deaths of 8 people including three government officials and one policeman outside the town of Gambella led to further violence, causing the deaths of at least 70 people and possibly as many as 150. As a result, World Food Programme and United Nations High Commissioner for Refugees withdrew their international staff out of concern for their security.

== Demographics ==
Based on the 2007 Census conducted by the CSA, this woreda has a total population of 10,590, of whom 5,069 are men and 5,521 women; with an area of 3,118.79 square kilometers, Gambela has a population density of 3.40, which is less than the Zone average of 4.83 persons per square kilometer. While 1,096 or 10.35% are urban inhabitants, a further 264 or 2.49% are pastoralists. A total of 2,595 households were counted in this woreda, which results in an average of 4.1 persons to a household, and 2,528 housing units. The majority of the inhabitants said they were Protestant, with 75.72% of the population reporting they observed this belief, while 9.28% of the population practised Ethiopian Orthodox Christianity, 5.19% were Catholic, 1.79% practiced traditional religions, and 1.48% were Muslim.

According to the 1994 national census, the woreda's population was reported to be 26,439 in 12,532 households, of whom 13,781 were men and 12,658 women; 18,263 or 69.08% of the population were urban inhabitants. The five largest ethnic groups of Gambela woreda were the Anuak (48.03%), the Oromo (20.13%), the Amhara (9.89%), the Nuer (7.83%), and the Tigray (4.65%); all other ethnic groups made up 9.47% of the population. Anuak is spoken as a first language by 48.15%, 20.21% speak Oromiffa, 10.77% Amharic, 7.78% Nuer, and 4.42% speak Tigrinya; the remaining 8.67% spoke all other primary languages reported. The largest group of the inhabitants said they professed Ethiopian Orthodox Christianity, with 41.42% of the population reporting they practiced that belief, while 25.4% were Protestant, 6.43% practiced traditional religions, 5.19% were Catholic, and 4.285% were Muslim.
