= Administrative Zone 1 (Gambela) =

Former administrative region in Ethiopia

Coordinates: 8°20′N 34°50′E

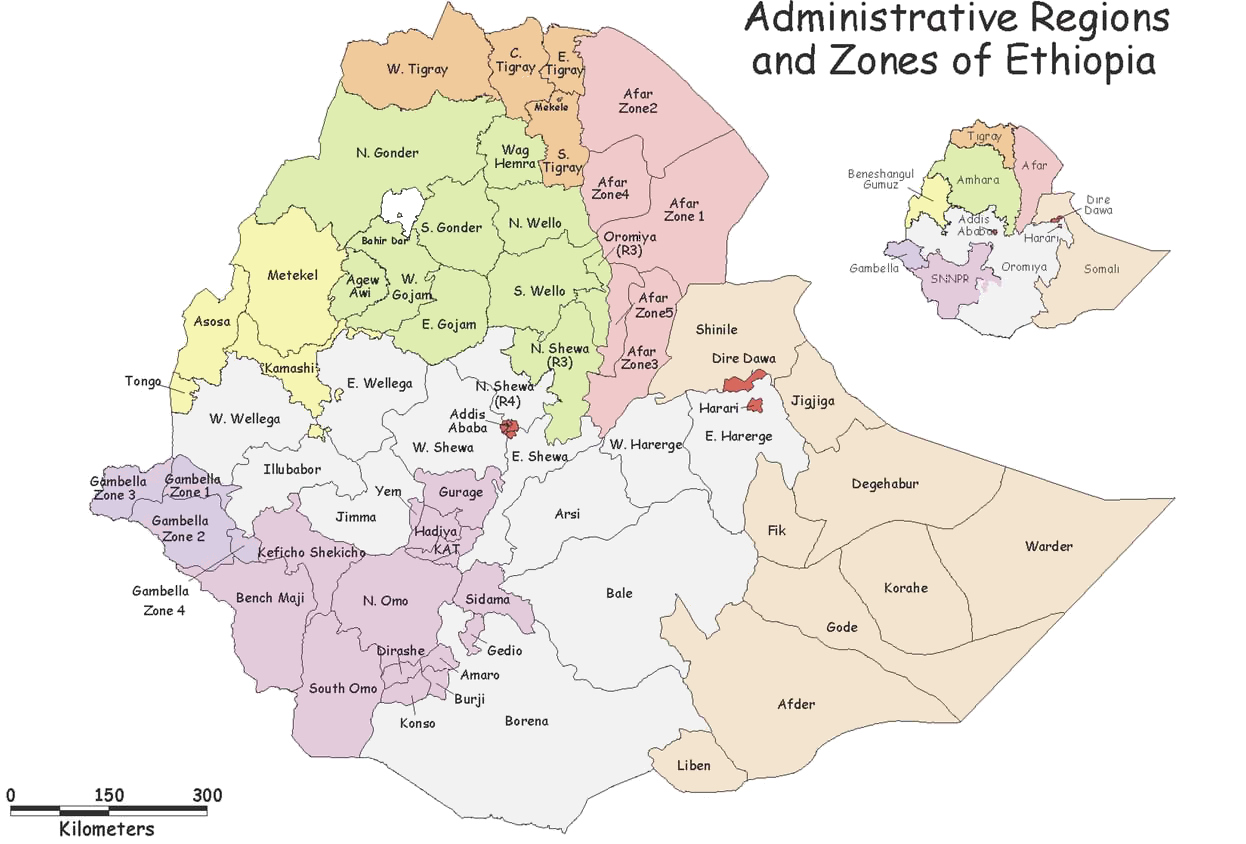
2000 map of the regions and zones of Ethiopia showing Administrative Zone 1 in Gambela

Map of the regions and zones of Ethiopia showing the current Gambela zones

Administrative Zone 1 was one of the three zones of the Ethiopian Region of Gambela. This zone was bordered on the south by Administrative Zone 2, on the west by Administrative Zone 3 and on the north and east by the Oromia Region. It was later added to Anuak Zone. Towns and cities in this zone included Itang and Gambela.

The terrain is mostly flat; rivers include the Baro, which is the only navigable river in Ethiopia, and the Alwero. A notable landmark is the Gambela National Park, which covers a large part of the Zone south of the Baro.

== Demographics ==
Based on figures from the Central Statistical Agency in 2005, this zone has an estimated total population of 67,042, of which 33,939 were males and 33,103 were females; 34,883 or 52% of its population are urban dwellers. With an estimated area of 4,696.89 square kilometers, the zone has an estimated population density of 14.27 people per square kilometer.

The 1994 national census reported a total population for this Zone of 45,207 in 29,688 households, of whom 23,189 were men and 22,018 women; 20,369 or 45.06% of the population were urban inhabitants. The five largest ethnic groups of the region were the Anuak (47.47%), the Nuer (24.4%), the Oromo (12.09%), the Amhara (6.12%), and the Tigray (2.79%); all other ethnic groups made up 7.13% of the population. Anuak is spoken as a first language by 47.56%, 24.37% speak Nuer, 12.14% Oromiffa, 6.64% Amharic, and 2.66% speak Tigrinya; the remaining 6.63% spoke all other primary languages reported. The largest group of the inhabitants said they were Protestant, with 36.76% of the population reporting they embraced that belief, while 31.3% professed Ethiopian Orthodox Christianity, 6.82% practiced traditional religions, 4.32% were Catholic, and 2.75% were Muslim.

== Woredas ==
- Gambela
- Itang
