= Timeline of Gambela (city) =

Chronology of Gambela city in Ethiopia

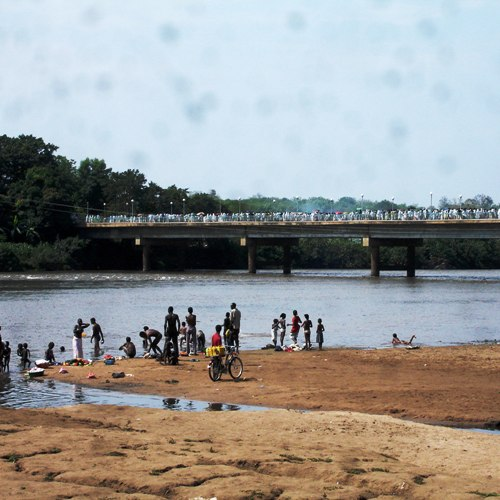
Baro River in Gambela

This is chronology of Gambela city, the capital of Gambela Region of Ethiopia.

- 15 May 1902 – Emperor Menelik II granted Britain use of port along with Baro River.
- 1911–1917 – Over 70% of external trade of Ethiopia came through Djibouti, though trade rate was the fastest in Gambela until Italian conquest.
- 1907 – the port and custom station were founded at Gambela.
- 9 July 1927 – Regent Ras Tafari later Emperor Haile Selassie granted concessions to T Zervos and A. Danalis to construct a road 180 kilometers in length to connect Gambela with the town of Metu and Gore.
- Mid-1930 – According to Richard Pankhurst, boats sailed twice in month during the rainy season, taking seven days downstream and eleven upstream.
- 14 October 1936 – the shipping service suspended and the steamer, together with the British resident, left Gambela.
- 3 February 1941 – the Italian by the 2/6 King's African Rifles took Gambela.
- May 1941 – Lij Tewedros, son of Lij Iyasu, surfaced in Gambela area and proclaimed himself Emperor. His insurrection was prevented by Belgian Congo troops before they left the area in February 1942.
- 19 December 1944 – Anglo-Ethiopian Agreement left Gambela enclave region.
- 15 October 1956 – after several years held as enclave by Sudanese government when they achieved independence, Gambela handed over to Ethiopia.
- 27 May 1991 – Gambela was captured by the Ethiopian People's Revolutionary Democratic Front (EPRDF).
- 13 December 2003 – Gambela massacre took place in which 30 Ethiopian highlander civilians killed Anuak population.
- 12 March 2012 – 2012 Gambella bus attack killed 19 people on board being shot dead.
