= Dimma (woreda) =

District in Gambela Region, Ethiopia

Coordinates: 7°10′N 34°40′E

Dimma is a woreda in Gambela Region, Ethiopia. Part of the Anuak Zone, Dimma is bordered on the southeast by the Southern Nations, Nationalities and Peoples Region (SNNPR), on the southwest by the Akobo River which separates it from South Sudan, on the north by Gog, and on the northeast by the Mezhenger Zone. The major town in Dimma is Dimma.

Originally part of Gog woreda, at some point between the 1994 national census and the 2001 Sample Agricultural Enumeration, Dimma was split from Gog. At first Dimma, along with Gog and Jor woredas, were part of the Administrative Zone 2; however between 2001 and 2007 the Zone was reorganized and Gog became part of the Anuak Zone. The western part of Sheko from SNNPR was also added to Dimma.

On 30 January 2004, a group of Anuak rebels attacked a group of outsiders working the gold fields in Dimma. Reportedly 196 people were killed and 25 wounded, most of whom were traditional miners mainly from the SNNPR. This was considered the largest number of civilian casualties in single incident since the December 2003 killings in Gambela.

== Demographics ==
Based on the 2007 Census conducted by the Central Statistical Agency of Ethiopia (CSA), this woreda has a total population of 8,001, of whom 4,568 are men and 3,433 women; with an area of 7,762.43 square kilometers, Dimma has a population density of 1.03, which is less than the Zone average of 4.83 persons per square kilometer. Reportedly 2,103 or 26.28% are urban inhabitants. A total of 2,435 households were counted in this woreda, which results in an average of 3.3 persons to a household, and 2,203 housing units. The majority of the inhabitants said they were Protestant, with 35.55% of the population reporting they observed this belief, while 33.73% of the population practised Ethiopian Orthodox Christianity, 17.52% were Muslim, and 7.61% practiced traditional religions.
