= Jor (woreda) =

District in Gambela Region, Ethiopia

Coordinates: 7°45′N 33°50′E

Jor is a woreda in Gambela Region, Ethiopia. Part of the Anuak Zone, Jor is bordered on the south by the Akobo River which separates it from South Sudan, on the west and north by the Nuer Zone, on the northeast by Abobo, and on the east by Gog; the Alooworro River defines part of its northern boundary. The administrative center of this County is Ongoogi.

== Overview ==
The terrain of Jor is flat, and the eastern part is swampy; the elevation ranges from 300 to 400 meters above sea level. Important rivers in this woreda include the Gilo. According to the Atlas of the Ethiopian Rural Economy published by the Central Statistical Agency (CSA), around 15% of the woreda is forest. A notable landmark is the Gambela National Park, which occupies the woreda north of the Gilo.

The economy of Jor is predominantly agricultural. There are no agricultural cooperatives, no documented roads, and little other infrastructure.

== History ==
At the start of the Federal Democratic Republic of Ethiopia, Jor was part of the Administrative Zone 2; however between 2001 and 2007 the Zone was reorganized and Jor became part of the Anuak Zone.

On 11 April 2007, it was reported that over 1,000 well-armed members of the Murle crossed from southern Sudan and attacked an Anuak village named Angela in Jor, some 150 kilometers from the capital, Gambela. The attack claimed the lives of 26 people, left 13 people seriously wounded, 200 houses burnt, and large herds of cattle stolen. This raid was preceded by one on a Nuer village, called Bilimkuon, 95 kilometers from the capital; this attack left seven people dead, and rustled over 3,936 head of cattle.

== Demographics ==
Based on the 2007 Census conducted by the CSA, this woreda has a total population of 9,366, an increase of 32.00% over the 1994 census, of whom 4,360 are men and 5,006 women; with an area of 3,342.31 square kilometers, Jor has a population density of 2.80, which is less than the Zone average of 4.83 persons per square kilometer. Reportedly 633 or 6.76% are urban inhabitants. A total of 1,808 households were counted in this woreda, which results in an average of 5.2 persons to a household, and 1,766 housing units. The majority of the inhabitants said they were Protestant, with 75.91% of the population reporting they observed this belief, while 7.93% were Catholic, 7.71% practiced traditional religions, and 4.54% of the population practised Ethiopian Orthodox Christianity, 1.48% were Muslim.

According to the 1994 national census, the woreda's population was reported to be 7,093 in 936 households, of whom 3,271 were men and 3,822 women; no urban inhabitants were recorded. (This total also includes an estimate for four kebeles which were not counted; these were estimated to have 2,866 inhabitants, of whom 1,337 were men and 1,529 women.) The largest ethnic group in Jor was the Anuak (99.69%), and Anuak was spoken as a first language by 99.81% of the inhabitants interviewed. The majority of the inhabitants said they were Protestant, with 56.3% of the population reporting they practiced that belief, while 33.57% practiced traditional beliefs.
