= Gambela conflict =

Armed conflict in Gambela Region, Ethiopia

- Part of the conflicts in the Horn of Africa and Ethiopian civil conflict (2018–present)
- The Gambela Region within Ethiopia
Date	1985 – present
Location	Gambela Region

Belligerents
GPLA; GPLM; OLA	Ethiopia; ENDF

Commanders and leaders
	Omod Mutukuye; Ugetu Ading

Casualties and losses
- At least 138 killed and 113 injured due to unrest and significant property damage reported since May 2023.

The Gambela conflict refers to sporadic conflicts in the Gambela Region of Ethiopia between armed groups of the indigenous Anuak people with civilians of the indigenous Nuer people, and the Ethiopian military. Following resettlement policies implemented by the Derg regime in the 1980s, a number of ethnic conflicts have taken place between the Anuak people indigenous to much of the Gambela region, and other groups which were resettled in the region. Following the collapse of the Derg regime, persistent ethnic tensions in the region have occasionally exploded into open conflict. The South Sudanese Civil War has contributed to the crisis in the Gambela region and there were frequent raids and abductions of children by armed Murle groups from South Sudan.

Gambela region hosted an active anti-government insurgent group known as the Gambela People's Liberation Army (GPLA). In June 2022, the GPLA conducted a joint operation alongside fighters from the Oromo Liberation Army (OLA) and took partial control of the capital city for several hours. The Ethiopian Human Rights Commission released a report documenting evidence that at least 50 civilians were killed by security forces following the attack. However, in April 2023 the leadership of the GPLA announced that the group had "completely withdrawn from armed struggle," resulting in the surrender of hundreds of fighters to the Ethiopian government. Despite this, attacks by various other militant groups, and revenge killings, continue to afflict the region.

== Background ==
The Anuak people are one of the more than eighty ethnic groups in Ethiopia. Their villages are scattered along the rivers of southeastern Sudan and western Ethiopia. They speak a Nilotic language known as Dha Anywaa, which is spoken by several Anuaks in Ethiopia. Currently there are around 100 000 Anuaks in Ethiopia, although exact populations are likely underestimated due to the forced migration of the Anuak. Historically, the Anuak kingdom used to be a federation of villages headed by an independent Nyie. These villages were constantly feuding among themselves for the control of the Ocwak – the royal throne and bead. Traditionally, the Anyuak wear large amounts of beads and other artifacts like the tail of giraffe.

=== Issues ===
The Anuaks have many neighbor ethnic groups including the Ajiebo Murle, Nuer, Dhuok Suri, the Oromo, and Amhara (the highlanders). Their relationship with other ethnic groups is usually hostile and violent, especially with the Nuer who have pushed them to the east by taking over other anuak provinces and forcing anuak civilians to flee. There are many natural resources in western Ethiopia and adding more fuel to the violence is the more than eight languages spoken by other groups around the Anuak land. Anuak activists have claimed that ethnic Anuaks in Ethiopia have suffered from torture, indiscriminate killings, looting, and discrimination from various other minority militias operating in the country, as well as from the Ethiopian government itself. The Ethiopian government has denied that its military was involved in attacks on Anuaks, and instead attributed violence in the region to local ethnic militias. Others have alleged that Anuak militias have committed human rights abuses against other groups, such as killing Nuer civilians in the act of defending their people and their land.

Another ethnic group, the Majang, are an ethnic group indigenous to the Mezhenger Zone within the Gambela Region. The Majang settled in Gambela region, Oromia and in southwest Ethiopia. The majority dwell in Gambela, and few lived outside Ethiopia. Historically, the Majang lived in small, temporary communities, and had limited interaction with the central Ethiopian state. Traditional Majang ways of life and cultural practices went relatively undisturbed until the 20th century, when the incorporation of the Gambela region into the Ethiopian Empire led to increased contact between the Majang and the outside world. Throughout the 20th century, Majang society underwent significant changes, including the introduction of new agricultural and animal husbandry practices, the establishment of permanent settlements, and the erosion of their traditional social and political structures. Some lands occupied by the Majang are especially fertile, and common crops grown by the Majang include coffee, fruits, spices, maize, durra, and root crops. The Majang also traditionally engaged in beekeeping. During the 20th century, and through the early 21st century, indigenous Majang lands have faced deforestation, increased water scarcity, and the destruction of wild habitats. Compounding this trend, various highlander groups have increasingly been migrating to land belonging indigenous Majang farmers throughout the early 21st century. In recent decades, there have been efforts by the Majang people and their advocates to preserve their unique identity, land rights, and traditional practices. This includes campaigns to protect the Majang's ancestral forests, and to gain greater recognition and political representation for the Majang community within the Ethiopian federal system. Some Majang have also taken up armed struggle against the Ethiopian government.

== Militant activities ==
After the EPRDF government came to power in 1991, it ruled the area through local parties, but real power was still in the hands of the local highlanders. And ethnic conflicts occur between the highlanders and the Anuaks, sometimes bringing in the Nuers as well. These ethnic problems began in the 1980s – when the previous Derg government used forced resettlement to bring about 50,000 people from Ethiopia's exhausted central highlands suffering drought to the fertile, but swampy, malaria-infested Gambela region where the Anuak and other tribes reside. The Anuak rebels also attack miners and economic development workers in Gambela. In 2004 the militants killed three government refugee workers and attacked a United Nations vehicle.

In October, 2005, Anuak rebels attacked four police officers and prison wardens. Along with this attack the Anuak militants targeted the police station and prison to free many jailed rebel fighters who were unrightfully imprisoned and detained for many years. They also wounded six other men and murdered the Gambela Regional police commissioner.

=== Nuer conflict ===
The Nuer have lived in South Sudan for centuries, and thousands of them fled to Ethiopia due to conflict in South Sudan. Thousands of Nuer live in the Gambela Region of Ethiopia as refugees. Despite the attempt of the regional government to keep peace, Anuak rebels continue to attack Nuers because Anuak were not happy with the number of Nuer refugees fleeing to Gambela and how Nuer were killing anywaa civilians for no apparent reason and claimed Anuak land. In August 2002, two Nuer men were stabbed several times by a group of Anuak youth in and around Gambela's main market. Also in 2002, a hand grenade thrown onto a passenger Isuzu truck, full of Nuers traveling to Lare in Jikawo woreda, killing two instantly and wounding 18. One of the victims later died in hospital from his wounds. The attack took place at the Mobil fuel station in the middle of Gambela town. The attacker who was also wounded in the process was later held by the army and allegedly confessed that he was part of a bigger group organized to eliminate the Nuers. The plan was originally envisaged to attack the Nuer during the Ethiopian New Year celebration. A hand grenade was also thrown into a dormitory at the Teachers’ training College wounding six ethnic Nuer Sudanese refugees, one of them seriously. During the same day, a group of Anuak coming as far as the Abobo woreda attacked the Nuer settlement at Ochom for the second time, wounding four people, but killing 35 sheep, six cows and unspecified number of goats. Four households were burned down. Among the assailants, unspecified number was killed or wounded. Later in 2002, five Nuer men who went to cut bamboo for roofing on the road to the Anfillo woreda in the Oromia Region were ambushed, killing two and wounding one; the survivors identified their attackers as Anuaks. The perpetrators were not immediately caught.

In June 2006, alleged Anuak militants attacked a bus travelling from Addis Ababa to Gambela and killed fourteen passengers, while around 40 more people were injured and wounded in the attack.

=== 2020s ===
In September 2021, members of the Gambela Liberation Army purportedly carried out multiple attacks on Anuak civilians in the city of Gambela.

In 2023, conflict broke out in traditionally Majang-inhabited areas between the Majang and various highlander groups. Conflicts around this time have broken out within these areas, and along the borders of these lands and those mostly inhabited by other groups.

During the 2020s, the Kwama people in Gambela have been victims of repeated attacks, robbery and forced conscription by the OLA. In August 2024, the OLA attacked Mao-Komo special woreda in the nearby Benishangul-Gumuz Region, which resulted in the displacement of many Kwama people to Pokong Kebele in Abol woreda in Gambela. The Kwama people in Gambela have also been victims of GLA attacks and robbery because they are settled in remote areas close to training camps for the OLA and the GLA. Similarly, the Opo people, another minority ethnic group in Gambela, have been affected by GLA activities due to their proximity to areas where the GLA operates, with many of them displaced from Wankey, their village in Itang special woreda.
