= Wentawo =

Coordinates: 8°20′N 33°27′E

Map of Ethiopia showing Gambela

Wanthoa [Wanthɔa̱r] is one of the woredas in the Gambela Region of Ethiopia. Part of the Nuer Zone, Wanthoa is bordered on the south by Akobo, on the west and north by South Sudan, on the east by Jikaw, and on the southeast by Anuak Zone; the Akobo River to the west and the Baro River on the north define Wanthoa's boundaries with South Sudan. Towns in this woreda include Matar.

The terrain in Wanthoa is predominantly swampy, with few distinguishing high points; elevations range around 410 meters above sea level. Rivers include the Makuey.

Between 2001 and 2007, the northern kebeles were split from Akobo woreda to create Wanthoa.

== Demographics ==
Based on the 2007 Census conducted by the Central Statistical Agency of Ethiopia (CSA), this woreda has a total population of 20,970, of whom 10,991 are men and 9,979 women; with an area of 887.74 square kilometers, Wentawo has a population density of 23.62, which is less than the Zone average of 23.79 persons per square kilometer. While 2,851 or 13.60% are urban inhabitants, a further 59 individuals are pastoralists. A total of 3,996 households were counted in this woreda, which results in an average of 5.2 persons to a household, and 3,846 housing units. The majority of the inhabitants said they were Protestant, with 92.82% of the population reporting they observed this belief, while 3.22% practiced traditional religions, 1.89% were Catholic, and 1.58% of the population practised Ethiopian Orthodox Christianity.
