= Administrative Zone 3 (Gambela) =

Former administrative region of Gambela Region, Ethiopia

Coordinates: 8°10′N 33°10′E

2000 map of the regions and zones of Ethiopia showing Administrative Zone 3 in Gambela

Map of the regions and zones of Ethiopia showing the current Gambela zones

Administrative Zone 3 is a former administrative subdivision of the Ethiopian Region of Gambela. This zone was bordered by Sudan on the south, west and north, by Administrative Zone 1 on the east and Administrative Zone 2 on the southeast; the Pibor defines the border on the south and west, while the Baro defines it for the northern border. Towns in this zone included Tergol and Telut. Most of the area of this zone was added to Nuer Zone and some parts were added to Anuak Zone.

The economy of Akobo was predominantly agricultural. There are no agricultural cooperatives, no documented roads, and little other infrastructure. Both Jikawo and Akobo woredas are flooded during the rainy season, requiring the people to migrate to the highlands with their cattle until the waters recede; thus raising livestock is the primary source of income in this Zone.

== Demographics ==
Based on figures from the Central Statistical Agency in 2005, this zone has an estimated total population of 88,784, of whom 45,529 are men and 43,255 are women; 1,741 or 2% of its population are urban dwellers. With an estimated area of 6,023.29 square kilometers, this zone has an estimated population density of 14.74 people per square kilometer.

The 1994 national census reported a total population for this Zone of 68,224 in 9,688 households, of whom 34,807 were men and 33,417 women; 1,013 or 1.48% of the population were urban inhabitants. (This total also includes an estimate for 9 of the 19 kebeles in Akobo woreda, which were not counted; they were estimated to have 13,903 inhabitants, of whom 6,637 were men and 7,266 women.) The two largest ethnic groups of Zone 3 were the Nuer (98.38%), and the Anuak (1.56%); all other ethnic groups made up 0.06% of the population. Nuer was spoken as a first language by 98.47%, and 1.49% speak Anuak; the remaining 0.04% spoke all other primary languages reported. The majority of the inhabitants said they were Protestant, with 64.73% of the population reporting they embraced that belief, while 15.24% practiced traditional religions, 3.74% professed Ethiopian Orthodox Christianity, and 1.31% were Catholic.

== Woredas ==
- Akobo woreda (Tiergol)
- Jikaw woreda (Kuachthiang, Nipnip)
- Lare woreda (Kuergeng)
- Makuey woreda (Nyinenyang)
- Wanthoa woreda (Matar)

by Kier Deng Jock
