= Administrative Zone 2 (Gambela) =

Former administrative region in Ethiopia

Coordinates: 7°10′N 34°15′E

Map of the regions and zones of Ethiopia showing the current Gambela zones

Administrative Zone 2 was one of the three zones of the Ethiopian Region of Gambela. This zone was bordered by South Sudan and the Southern Nations, Nationalities, and Peoples Region on the south, Administrative Zone 3 on the west, Administrative Zone 1 on the north, and the Godere special woreda on the east. It was added to Anuak Zone. Towns in this zone included Abobo and Fugnido.

Rivers in this Zone include the Alwero and the Gilo; major bodies of water include Lakes Alwero and Tata. A notable landmark is the Gambela National Park, which occupies the land west of the Fugnido - Gambela road and north of the Gilo.

== Demographics ==
Based on figures from the Central Statistical Agency in 2005, this zone has an estimated total population of 48,084, of whom 23,235 are men and 24,849 are women; 4,935 or 10.3% of its population are urban dwellers. With an estimated area of 13,142.51 square kilometers, this zone has an estimated population density of 3.66 people per square kilometer.

The 1994 national census reported a total population for this Zone of 36,199 in 4,075 households, of whom 17,463 were men and 18,736 women; 2,869 or 7.93% of the population were urban inhabitants. (This total also includes an estimate for two kebeles in Gog woreda and four in Jor, which were not counted; these areas were estimated to have 5,562 inhabitants, of whom 2,566 were men and 2,996 women.) The five largest ethnic groups of Zone 2 were the Anuak (72.65%), the Kambaata (9.17%), the Amhara (6.22%), the Oromo (3.35%), and the Mezhenger (3.14%); all other ethnic groups made up 5.47% of the population. Anuak is spoken as a first language by 72.71%, 9.34% speak Kambaata, 6.61% Amharic, 3.12% Majang, and 3.06% speak Oromiffa; the remaining 5.16% spoke all other primary languages reported. The largest group of the inhabitants said they were Protestant, with 38.52% of the population reporting they embraced that belief, while 20.68% professed Ethiopian Orthodox Christianity, 13.95% practiced traditional religions, 6.49% were Muslim, and 5% were Catholic.

== Woredas ==
This list of the woredas, or districts, is compiled from material on the CSA website. However, the Ethiopian Disaster Prevention and Preparedness Agency map of the Gambela Region disagrees with the information from the CSA and the map prepared by UN-OCHA for Gambela: although all have Abobo woreda, where the UN-OCHA map (copyright 2003) shows Gog and Jor the DPPA map (copyright 2006) instead shows Gilo and Dimma woredas. The CSA only provides statistics for Gog and Jor in their latest population estimates.

- Abobo
- Gog
- Jor
