= Lare (woreda) =

Coordinates: 33°50′N 8°15′E

Map of Ethiopia showing Gambela

Lare is one of the Districts of Ethiopia, or woredas, in the Gambela Region of Ethiopia. Part of the Nuer Zone, Lare is bordered on the south and east by the Anuak Zone, on the west by the Baro River which separates it from Jikaw, and on the north by the Jikaw River which separates it from South Sudan. Towns in Lare include Kuergeng.

The terrain in Lare consists of marshes and grasslands; elevations range from 410 to 430 meters above sea level. A notable landmark is Gambela National Park, which occupies part of the area south of the Baro.

At some point between 2001 and 2007, the eastern kebeles of Jikaw were split off to create Lare.

== Demographics ==
Based on the 2007 Census conducted by the Central Statistical Agency of Ethiopia (CSA), this woreda has a total population of 31,406, of whom 16,145 are men and 15,261 women; with an area of 685.17 square kilometers, Lare has a population density of 45.84, which is greater than the Zone average of 23.79 persons per square kilometer. While 6,549 or 20.85% are urban inhabitants, a further 156 or 0.50% are pastoralists. A total of 5,432 households were counted in this woreda, which results in an average of 5.8 persons to a household, and 5,217 housing units. The majority of the inhabitants said they were Protestant, with 86.81% of the population reporting they observed this belief, while 7.48% practiced traditional religions, 2.69% were Catholic, and 1.79% of the population practised Ethiopian Orthodox Christianity.
