= Itang (woreda) =

District in Gambela Region, Ethiopia

Coordinates: 8°15′N 34°10′E

Itang is a woreda in Gambela Region, Ethiopia. Because Itang is not part of any zone in the Gambela Region, it is considered a Special woreda, an administrative subdivision which is similar to an autonomous area. It is bordered on the south and southeast by the Anuak Zone, on the west by the Nuer Zone, on the northwest by South Sudan, and on the north by the Oromia Region; part of the southern boundary is defined by the Alwero River. The major town in Itang is Itang.

== Overview ==
The terrain is mostly flat; the altitude of this woreda ranges from 350 to 480 meters above sea level; rivers include the Baro, which the Alwero is a tributary of. According to the Atlas of the Ethiopian Rural Economy published by the Central Statistical Agency (CSA), around 10% of the woreda is forest. A notable landmark is the Gambela National Park, which embraces the woreda south of the Baro.

The economy of Itang is predominantly agricultural. There are no agricultural cooperatives, no documented roads, and little other infrastructure.

The woreda is one of the highly affected woredas by floods.

== History ==
At the start of the Federal Democratic Republic of Ethiopia, Itang was part of the Administrative Zone 1; however between 2001 and 2007 it was separated from that Zone and became a special woreda.

In 1987, Sudan People's Liberation Army (SPLA) soldiers massacred about 16 civilians (most of them women and children) and militiamen in the village of Akado in Itang, the site of a former American mission. Local Anuak militia and the SPLA clashed in Akado two years later, resulting in the deaths of 10 SPLA men and 14 local people. A 2002 United Nations Emergency Unit for Ethiopia assessment report mentions increasing conflict during the first part of that year between the Anuak and Nuer in this woreda over control of arable land along the rivers where the Anuak normally farm.

== Demographics ==
Based on the 2007 Census conducted by the Central Statistical Agency of Ethiopia (CSA), this woreda has a total population of 35,686, an increase of 190.14% over the 1994 census, of whom 17,955 are men and 17,731 women; with an area of 2,188.34 square kilometers, Itang has a population density of 16.31. While 5,958 or 16.7% are urban inhabitants, a further 278 or 0.78% are pastoralists. A total of 6,578 households were counted in this woreda, which results in an average of 5.4 persons to a household, and 6,248 housing units. The main ethnicities of this Zone are the Nuer (63.96%), Anuak (25.17%), foreigners from Sudan (4.62%), Shita (2.66%), and all other ethnic groups 3.59%. Languages spoken in this Zone include Nuer (68.72%), Anuak (25.75%), and Opuuo (2.66%). The religion with the largest number of believers is Protestant with 81.63% of the population, while other groups with sizable followings are traditional beliefs (7.54%), Orthodox Christian 6.27%, and Roman Catholic 2.62%.

According to the 1994 national census, the woreda's population was reported to be 18,768 in 17,156 households, of whom 9,408 were men and 9,360 women; 2,106 or 11.22% of the population were urban inhabitants. The two largest ethnic groups in Itang were the Nuer (47.74%) and the Anuak (46.68%); all other ethnic groups made up 5.58% of the population. However the local Anuak do not accept these numbers, claiming that Nuers from Sudan crossed to be counted during that census, especially in Itang. Nuer is spoken as a first language by 47.74%, and 46.73% speak Anuak; the remaining 5.53% spoke all other primary languages reported. The majority of the inhabitants said they were Protestant, with 52.77% of the population reporting they practiced that belief, while 17.05% professed Ethiopian Orthodox Christianity, 7.36% practiced traditional religions, and 3.1% were Catholic.
