= Godere (woreda) =

District in Gambela Region, Ethiopia

Coordinates: 7°20′N 35°10′E

Godere is a woreda in Gambela Region, Ethiopia. Part of the Mezhenger Zone, Godere is bordered on the south and east by the Southern Nations, Nationalities and Peoples Region (SNNPR), and on the west by Mengesh. The largest town in Godere is Meti.

== Overview ==
Godere encompasses the headwaters of the Gilo River, thus its terrain is predominantly hilly, unlike the rest of Gambela. According to the Atlas of the Ethiopian Rural Economy published by the Central Statistical Agency (CSA), this woreda has an average elevation of between 500 and 1000 meters with an average slope between 2 and 4%; over 40% of the area is covered with forest.

The economy of Godere is predominantly agricultural. There are no agricultural cooperatives, no documented roads, and little other infrastructure.

== History ==
At the start of the Federal Democratic Republic of Ethiopia, Godere was the only woreda of the Administrative Zone 4 and thus considered a Special woreda; however between 1994 and 2001 Godere was made part of the Administrative Zone 2. Subsequently, but before 2007, a number of kebeles were split off to create Mengesh; both woredas became the Mezhenger Zone.

A 2002 United Nations Emergency Unit for Ethiopia assessment report mentions increasing conflict between the Mezhenger and Sheko in the neighboring Yeki woreda of the SNNPR, which spilled over into Godere.

== Demographics ==
Based on the 2007 census conducted by the CSA, this woreda has a total population of 38,781, of whom 19,928 are men and 18,853 women; with an area of 592.75 square kilometers, Godere has a population density of 65.43, which is greater than the Zone average of 26.28 persons per square kilometer. Reportedly 7,140 or 18.41% are urban inhabitants. A total of 9,752 households were counted in this woreda, which results in an average of 4.0 persons to a household, and 9,494 housing units. The majority of the inhabitants said they practised Ethiopian Orthodox Christianity, with 42.12% of the population reporting they observed this belief, while 34.98 were Protestant, and 20.83% were Muslim.

According to the 1994 national census, the woreda's population was reported to be 32,232 in 9,134 households, of whom 17,443 were men and 14,789 women; 3,173 or 9.84% of the population were urban inhabitants. The five largest ethnic groups of the region were the Amhara (24.48%), Mezhenger (23.63%), Kafficho (20.78%), Oromo (12.57%), the Mocha (9.57%), and Tigray (3.18%); all other ethnic groups made up 5.8% of the population. Amharic was spoken as a first language by 26.94%, 23.62% spoke Majang, 19.47% Kafa, 12.53% Oromiffa, and 9.16% Mocha; the remaining 8.28% spoke all other primary languages reported. The majority of the inhabitants said they professed Ethiopian Orthodox Christianity, with 51.71% of the population reporting they embraced that belief, while 24.49% were Protestant, 15.71% were Muslim, 3.31% practiced traditional religions, and 3.13% were Catholic.
