= Anuak =

Anuak may refer to:

- Anuak people, East Africa
- Anuak language, spoken primarily in the Western part of Ethiopia
- Anuak Zone, Ethiopian region of Gambela
