= Mengesh =

Mengesh is one of the districts of Ethiopia, or woredas, in the Gambela Region of Ethiopia. Part of the Mezhenger Zone, Mengesh is bordered on the south and east by the Southern Nations, Nationalities and Peoples Region (SNNPR), on the west by Anuak Zone, on the north by the Oromia Region, and on the southeast by Godere. It was part of Godere woreda.

== Demographics ==
Based on the 2007 census conducted by the CSA, this woreda has a total population of 20,467, of whom 10,639 are men and 9,828 women. The majority of the inhabitants said they practised Ethiopian Orthodox Christianity, with 54.83% of the population reporting they observed this belief, while 39.09 were Protestant, and 5.19% were Muslim.
