= Itang =

Town in Gambela Region, Ethiopia

Itang Ittang, Etang
- Town
- Location within Ethiopia
- Coordinates: 08°12′N 34°16′E
- Country: Ethiopia
- Region: Gambela
- Special woreda: Itang Special Woreda
- Elevation: 480 m (1,570 ft)

Population (2005)
  - Total: 3,601
- Time zone: UTC+3 (EAT)

Itang (Ethiopic: ኢታንግ), also spelt Etang and Ittang, is a town in the Gambela Region in western Ethiopia. Within Gambela, Itang belongs to Itang woreda which forms a special woreda (district).

== History ==
The town's importance can be traced to Article IV of the treaty signed by Emperor Menelik and the British minister, Harrington, in May 1902, which defined the boundary between Ethiopia and Sudan and designated the Itang area as a British trading enclave. However, Itang was too far from the Ethiopian Plateau, and after the Ethiopian government authorized the transfer on 8 October 1904, the concession was moved upstream to Gambela.

In the 1980s, the Second Sudanese Civil War led to the influx of refugees from Southern Sudan, with the Itang camp becoming the largest refugee camp in the world for some time. The camp was supported by UNHCR and the supplies sold by the camp's refugees were a major resupply source for the Sudan People's Liberation Army.

Itang was partially flooded by the Baro River, on which it is located, in mid-1998 and July–August 1999.

== Description and demographics ==
Itang is also spelt Etang Ethiopic: ኢታንግ and Ittang. It is located on the Baro River (also known as the Openo River or the Upeno River).

Based on figures from the Central Statistical Agency in 2005, this town had an estimated total population of 3,601 of whom 1,929 were males and 1,672 were females. The 1994 national census reported this town had a total population of 2,106 of whom 1,176 were males and 930 were females.

According to the 1994 national census, its total population was 2,106. The ethnic breakdown was 53.7% Anuak, 28.54% Nuer, 6.79% Oromo, 6.41% Amhara, 1.57% Tigray, and 3% all others.

== Notable people ==
Commander William Nyuon Bany, a co-founder of the Sudan People's Liberation Army (SPLA), lived at Itang for some time. His daughter Nyadol Nyuon, Australian lawyer and human rights activist, was born in the Itang refugee camp.
