= Dimma =

Dimma may refer to:

- Dimma (woreda), a woreda in the Gambela Region of Ethiopia
- Book of Dimma, 8th-century Irish pocket Gospel Book
- William Dimma (born 1928), Canadian businessperson
- Etiyé Dimma Poulsen (born 1968), Ethiopian-born Danish/Belgian sculptor
- Dimma (band), Icelandic metal band
