= Gambella University =

Public university in Gambella, Ethiopia

- ጋምቤላ ዩኒቨርሲቲ
- Motto: Building Generations
- Type: Public
- Established: 2014
- President: Diriba Eticha Tujuba
- Location: Gambella, Ethiopia; 8.239°N 34.606°E
- Campus: Urban
- Website: www.gmu.edu.et
- Location in Ethiopia

Gambella University (Ge'ez: ጋምቤላ ዩኒቨርሲቲ, GMU) is a public higher education institution located in Gambella, the capital of the Gambella People's National Regional State (GPNRS) in western Ethiopia. The university was established in 2014 to contribute to education, research, and regional development. It offers undergraduate and postgraduate programs across multiple fields of study.

== History ==
The institution was initially founded as Gambella Agricultural, Technical, Vocational and Educational Training (GATVET) College in 2002 under the Ministry of Agriculture and Rural Development. Over a decade, GATVET graduated more than 1,950 diploma students and 493 certificate students.

In 2012, it became affiliated with Mettu University as the College of Agriculture and Natural Resources. In 2014, it was re-established as an independent public university. The foundation stone for Gambella University was laid by then-Prime Minister Hailemariam Desalegn and the President of GPNRS, Gatluak Tut.

== Academic structure ==
As of 2025, Gambella University operates the following academic units:

=== Colleges ===
- College of Agriculture and Natural Resource
- College of Engineering and Technology
- College of Natural and Computational Sciences
- College of Business and Economics

=== Faculties ===
- Faculty of Social Sciences and Humanities

=== Schools ===
- School of Law
- Postgraduate School

The university offers approximately 31 undergraduate and 10 postgraduate programs across these disciplines.

Undergraduate programs include fields such as Civics and Ethical Education, Gender and Development Studies, Peace and Conflict Studies, Sociology and Social Anthropology, History and Heritage Management, and Law.

Postgraduate programs include degrees such as:

- Master of Arts (MA) in Peace and Security Studies
- Master of Arts (MA) in Project Planning and Management
- Master of Business Administration (MBA)
- Master of Arts (MA) in Teaching English as a Foreign Language (TEFL)
- Master of Science (MSc) in Animal Production
- Master of Science (MSc) in Environmental Science
- Master of Science (MSc) in Mathematics
- Master of Laws (LLM) in Human Rights

== Research and community engagement ==
Gambella University engages in research activities related to agriculture, health, natural resource management, and social development. The institution also implements community service projects, targeting issues such as food security, public health improvement, and environmental conservation.

== International collaborations ==
The university has established academic and research partnerships with national and international institutions, including:

- In January 2024, Gambella University signed a memorandum of understanding (MoU) with the Armauer Hansen Research Institute (AHRI) to collaborate on research in agriculture, health sciences, and technology.
- In February 2024, the university established a partnership with ICCS College of Engineering and Management in Kerala, India.
- In April 2024, an agreement was signed with Hannam University in Daejeon, South Korea, focusing on academic collaboration and faculty development.

== Administration ==
As of October 2023, the president of Gambella University is Diriba Eticha Tujuba.

== See also ==
- List of universities and colleges in Ethiopia
- Education in Ethiopia
