= List of districts in the Gambela Region =

Districts of the Gambela Region of Ethiopia

Gambela(Named after ANUAK chief who lived alone in a hut [Ken Doig in Menelik's journal (philatelic, USA) p323-324]

This is a list of the woredas (districts), in their zones of the Gambela Region of Ethiopia, based from materials on the Central Statistical Agency website.
