= Akwei Wa Cam =

Akwei Wa Cam, also spelled Akwai-wo-Caam, was an anuak noble, and later, king. He was the first and last monarch of the anuak kingdom from 1910 until his death in 1919.

Akwai was born in the late 1800s as a descendant of the Anyuak royal bloodline, he was a fierce rival of his predecessor, Uliimi, Whom exiled akwai to Ethiopia for his rivalry, During his time in Ethiopia, he had access for trading with local Ethiopian/ Gore Merchants, he had encouraged his followers to trade tusks with the Ethiopian dealers in exchange for firearms, Whom later he used to overthrow Uliimi of his royal emblems and execute him Akwai came to power in 1910, abandoning village chief policys and unifying the anuaks as one kingdom, He launched counteroffensives against the Nuer expansion, which driven the Anyuaks out almost completely off south Sudan, his modern weaponry devastated the Nuer, During the counteroffensive akwai has retrieved villages, Killed and captured hundreds,Captured thousands of cattle, Akwai sold the nuer captives to the ethipians to acquire even more firearms, Reginald Wingate the governor of the Soudan, Came aware of akwai's raids and stated "The anuak raids have forced our hand and we must go where we don't wish to".

In 1911, an Anglo egyptian expedition led by F.D Dickson attempted to stop the raids of the anuak, however, The anuaks displayed tactical withdrawal to interpret an image of Cowardry to the British, although f.d Dickson killed on 30 anuak, burned several villages, He withdrew with failure.

The same expedition also revealed to the British that the Anyuaks had acquired firearms, Whom estimated to be around 10,000-25,000 in possession of the anuak. In 1912, F.D. Dickson would give Charles Henry leveson a deadly mistaken, and costly advice by telling him that the anuak were Cowardry and easy, later in March, C.H. Leveson launched an expedition against the anuak, going down the akobo river with 500 men, and 10 officers, however, Akwai had completely outsmarted the British, he exploited his terrain to launch deadly assaults on the British force, Leveson retreated with failure, With 42 dead, 2 officers, J. W lichtenberg and C.E Kenahan were mortalized, along with 5 sudanese/Egyptian officers.

The British planned an invasion of anuakland in 1914, but we're disrupted by the outbreak of World War I in Europe.

Akwai had successfully defended against British offensives, going on without an foreign Attack until 1915, when Majid Abud, An Ethiopian tax agent tried invading adongo twice but akwai had defeated him and forced a withdrawal. Almost mortalizing the prominent Ethiopian agent

From 1915-1919, Akwai had completely terrorized nuer expansionists, Ethiopian and the British were hesitant to launch another offensive on him.

In 1919, Akwai had died undefeated, Successfully repelling against the nuer expansion and invasion of his people, along with colonialism and imperialism.

It was said that during his rule, he modernized the anuaks completely, With building several village complexes, strengthening the army significantly. the anuak were completely able to defend against outside invasions that almost left them to extinction.

It was not until akwai's death, In 1920 that the British finally entered Adongo. establishing colonial out posts, However control was weak and wasn't effective until 1941 after the second italo Ethiopian war.

After a year of power crisis, Akwai's son, Cam war akwei was appointed to be the king of anuaks by the British when was still a child, which devastated them even more into complete anarchy, Bringing an end to the unified anuak kingdom.
