= Gambela massacre =

2003 ethnic cleansing in Gambela Region, Ethiopia

- Gambela (Ethiopia)
- Location: Gambela, Ethiopia
- Date: 13–15 December 2003; New attacks since June 2022
- Target: Anuak people; For 2022 attacks, various groups targeted
- Attack type: Mass shooting; Rape; Arson; Pogrom
- Deaths: 65 (Ethiopian claim); 300+ (EHRC); 424 (Anuak groups)
- Injuries: Unknown
- Perpetrators: ENDF's 43rd Division non-Anauk civilians: In 2022, Oromo Liberation Army; Gambela Liberation Front (GLF); Government forces

The Gambela Massacre was a three-day-long massacre in the city of Gambela, Ethiopia, targeting Anuak people in December 2003, perpetrated by the ENDF (Ethiopian military forces) and "highlander" militias after an ambush of ARRA employees. It occurred during the Gambela conflict. Calls from the international community were made to condemn and stop the various forms of attacks against the Anuak people- i.e. Ethiopia to take immediate action and to comply to the International Convention on the Elimination of All Forms of Racial Discrimination ("ICERD"). The calls included actions against: 1) Racial Discrimination, 2) State obligation to protect and ensure economic development, economic, social, and cultural rights, 3) Freedom of movement, 4)The right to equal treatment in the justice system, 5) Protection Against Violence, and 6) Access to Remedies and Justice for Crimes of Racial Discrimination.

== Background ==
In 2002 Conflict between the Nuer and Anuak communities in Gambela killed over 100 and distanced thousands.

Throughout 2003 ethnic clashes in and around Gambela had left dozens dead. Anuak militias and highlanders militias had routinely battled over the countryside. In the second half of 2003 Anuak militias killed about 20 highlander civilians.

== Ambush ==
On the morning of 13 December 2003, a car carrying employee from the Administration for Refugee and Returnee Affairs looking to build a South Sudanese refugee camp in the city was ambushed by suspected Anuak groups about thirty kilometers outside Gambela. The ambush killed all eight government employees in the car.

== Massacre ==
After the ambush of ARRA personnel, a crowd of so-called "highlanders" (Amhara, Oromia, and Tigryian people) had formed near the regional council building where the bodies had been shown, the crowd then became increasingly angry. Soon highlander civilians and ENDF soldiers armed with machetes, axes, sticks, and iron bars in groups of about 30-50 began to roam through the Anuak neighborhoods of Gambela killing people and setting fire to buildings and homes. The building they could not set fire to had grenades thrown through the windows of the structure. In one incident the crowd descended onto the house of Okwier Oletho an Anuak pastor where people had sought refuge about 12 people were killed there. Anuak civilians fled into the forests surrounding the town and 382 had sought refuge in a catholic church. By the end of the massacre, 440 homes were destroyed and an estimated 300 people had been killed and 70,000 people were displaced. The worst affected neighborhoods of Gambela were Omminingah, Owalingah, Tier Kidi, and Addis Zefer.

== Victims ==
Anuak groups compiled a list of at least 88 of the victims.

== Attacks in 2022 ==
The start of the June 2022 violence in Gambela, the Southern SNNPR region is associated with a demonstration held by ‘non-indigenous’ also known as Degegnoch or high-landers, requesting local officials for protection from the frequent attacks against the group. However, reports show that ENDF (federal army) and regional forces fired toward the demonstrators causing casualties. Another armed clash between the Oromo OLF-Shane, Gambela Liberation Front (GLF), and government forces reportedly caused additional death from involved parties with no clear number on actual death tolls. The Ethiopian Human Rights Commission made calls to the government for protection.
