= Meti (Gambela), Ethiopia =

Meti
- Location within Ethiopia
- Coordinates: 07°14′N 35°19′E
- Country: Ethiopia
- Region: Gambela
- Zone: Mezhenger Zone
- Elevation: 1,266 m (4,154 ft)

Population (2005)
  - Total: 5,441
- Time zone: UTC+3 (EAT)

Meti is a town in south-western Ethiopia, located in Godere woreda of the Gambela Region. This town has a latitude and longitude of 07°14′N 35°19′E, with an elevation of 1266 meters above sea level.

Meti was the base of operations for three foreign traders in the early 1930s: D. Valentis, J. Isaris, and M. Karkalemis.

Based on figures from the Central Statistical Agency in 2005, Meti has an estimated total population of 5,441, of whom 2,750 are men and 2,691 are women. The 1994 national census reported this town had a total population of 3,173, of whom 1,676 are men and 1,497 are women.
