= Diriba Eticha Tujuba =

Ethiopian academic

- Born: Ethiopia
- Occupations: Academic, university administrator
- Known for: President of Gambella University

Diriba Eticha Tujuba is an Ethiopian academic and university administrator who has served as President of Gambella University, a public institution in Gambella, Ethiopia, since October 2023.

== Education ==
Tujuba earned a PhD in Applied Linguistics with a specialization in leadership communication from Andhra University, India, in 2019. He also holds a Master of Arts in English from Adama University (2012) and a Bachelor of Arts in Foreign Language and Literature from Hawassa University (2005). In parallel with his PhD studies, he pursued an MA in Public Administration at Andhra University.

== Career ==
Tujuba has held various academic and administrative roles in Ethiopian higher education. From 2020 to 2022, he served as Director for Institutional Transformation and Good Governance at Adama Science and Technology University (ASTU). He later became CEO of the President’s Office at ASTU, contributing to strategic planning and institutional development.

In 2019, Tujuba worked briefly at the Ethiopian Ministry of Science and Technology as Interim Director for International Relations and Cooperation, supporting national academic partnerships and international initiatives. Earlier in his career, he served as College Dean at Top College in Dire Dawa and Dean of Student Affairs at Sub-Saharan University College in Adama.

== Institutional partnerships ==
During Tujuba's presidency, Gambella University initiated international partnerships. In January 2024, the university signed a memorandum of understanding with the Armauer Hansen Research Institute (AHRI) to collaborate on research related to indigenous medicinal plants and communicable diseases.

Additional collaborations were formed with ICCS College of Engineering and Management in Kerala, India, and Hannam University in South Korea, focusing on faculty development and student exchange programs.
