= Nuer Zone =

Zone in Gambela Region of Ethiopia

Coordinates: 8°10′N 33°34′E

Nuer Zone Gua̱th Ciɛŋkä naath (ኑዌር ዞን)
- Zone
- Interactive map of Nuer Zone
- Country: Ethiopia
- Region: Gambela

Population (2007)
  - Total: 112,606

Map of Zones of Ethiopia

The Nuer Zone Amharic (ኑዌር ዞን) Thok Naath (Gua̱th Ciɛŋkä naath), is a zone in the Gambela Region of Ethiopia. It was created from former Administrative Zone 3. The Nuer zone is located in western Gambella and is the westernmost zone of Ethiopia. The Zone is bordered by South Sudan, on the Northern Baro River, Western Piwbör, and Southwestern Pibor River, on the east by Itang Special Woreda, and on the South-East by Anuak Zone. The administrative town of Nyinenyang (Nyin nyaaŋ) contains five administrative woredas: Kuergeng Town, Kuach Thia̱ng Town (Jekow/Jɔk dhurɛ), Nyinenyang Town,(Wanthɔa̱r), Matar Town, and Tiergol Town (Aköbä)Tiergol Town. Nuer Zone is within the Ethiopian lowlands and is relatively flat at an elevation between 400 and 430 meters above sea level. The zone consists of grasslands, marshes, and swamps with some forests. The economy is predominantly based on livestock. In 2006, there were no agricultural cooperatives, no documented roads, and little other Reference infrastructure. Both Jikawo and Akobo woredas are flooded during the rainy season, requiring the people to migrate to the highlands with their cattle until the waters recede; thus raising livestock is the primary source of income in this Zone.

== Demographics ==
Based on the 2007 Census conducted by the Central Statistical Agency of Ethiopia (CSA), this Zone has a total population of 112,606, of whom 60,543 are men and 52,063 women. 12,266 or 10.89% of the population are urban inhabitants. The three largest ethnic groups of the Nuer Zone were the Nuer (95.56%), the Anuak (2.06%) and the Sidama (1.16%); all other ethnic groups made up 1.22% of the population. Nuer was spoken as a first language by 96.68%, and 2.06% spoke Anuak; the remaining 1.26% spoke all other primary languages reported. The largest group of the inhabitants said they were Protestant, with 88.82% of the population reporting they embraced that belief, while 5.7% practiced traditional religions, 5.3% were Muslim, 3.26% were Catholic, and 1.44% professed Ethiopian Orthodox Christianity.
