= 2012 Gambella bus attack =

Terrorist attack

Coordinates: 8°13′30″N 34°36′09″E

- Gambela (Ethiopia)
- Location: Gambela, Ethiopia
- Date: 12 March 2012 (UTC+3)
- Attack type: Shooting
- Deaths: 19
- Injuries: 8
- Victim: 5 kidnapped

The 2012 Gambella bus attack was a shooting incident on 12 March 2012, 20 kilometers, or 12 miles, from the town of Gambella in Ethiopia in which 19 people were killed and 8 others were wounded. Odom Obang Olum, head of the local government describes the victims as Ethiopian residents who were travelling on a public bus, near the town of Obang.

While no group has claimed responsibility for this attack, Omot Odeng Olol, the regional president, attributes this attack to an anti-peace element they consider to be terrorists. Security forces were subsequently increased in the area after the attack.

== See also ==
- List of terrorist incidents, 2012
