= Mezhenger Zone =

Zone in Gambela Region of Ethiopia

Coordinates: 7°20′N 35°10′E

Gambela Region shown within Ethiopia

The Mezhenger Zone or Majang Zone is a zone in Gambela Region of Ethiopia. It is named for one of the three largest indigenous groups in Gambela, the Majangir. This zone is bordered on the south and east by the Southern Nations, Nationalities and Peoples Region (SNNPR), on the west by the Anuak Zone, and on the north by the Oromia Region. Towns in this Zone include Meti.

== Overview ==
The area of the Mezhenger Zone lies to the east of the escarpment which borders the edge of the lowlands which define the majority of the area of the Gambela Region. The terrain is predominantly hilly, and elevations range 550–1260 meters above sea level. According to the Atlas of the Ethiopian Rural Economy published by the Central Statistical Agency (CSA), over 40% of the Zone is forest.

This Zone covers the extent of the original special woreda of Godere, which was made part of the Administrative Zone 2 between 1994 and 2001. Subsequently, but before 2007, a number of kebeles were split off to create Mengesh and both woredas became the Mezhenger Zone.

== Demographics ==
Based on the 2007 Census conducted by the CSA, this Zone has a total population of 59,248, of whom 30,567 are men and 28,681 women; with an area of 2,254.65 square kilometers, Mezhenger Zone has a population density of 26.28. Reportedly 7,140 or 12.05% are urban inhabitants. A total of 15,661 households were counted in this Zone, which results in an average of 3.8 persons to a household, and 15,242 housing units. The main ethnicities of this Zone are the Amhara (26.96%), Kafficho (25.17%), Majangir (16.86%), Shakacho (11.67%), Oromo (8.84%), and all other ethnic groups 10.5%. Languages spoken in this Zone include Amharic (37.08%), Kafa (22.89%), Sheko (12.78%), and Oromiffa 9.91%; only a negligible number of inhabitants speak Majang. The religion with the largest number of believers is Orthodox Christian with 46.5% of the population, while other groups with sizable followings are Protestant, 36.4%, and Islam 15.42%.
