= Alwero River =

River in Gambela Region, Ethiopia

Alwero River Aluro, Aluoro, Alero
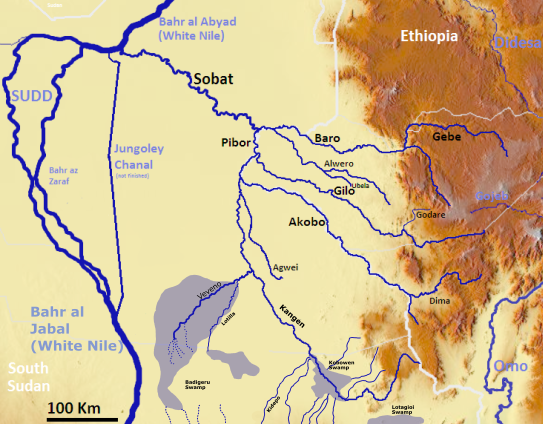
- Map of the Sobat River basin, showing the Alwero

Location
- Country: Ethiopia
- Regions: Gambela, Omoria

Physical characteristics
- Source
  - location: Nono Forest
  - coordinates: 7.714742°N 35.131386°E
  - elevation: 2,363 m (7,753 ft)
- Mouth: Baro River
  - coordinates: 8°26′N 33°24′E
  - elevation: 406 m (1,332 ft)
- Length: 275 km (171 mi)
- Basin size: 8,280 km^{2} (3,200 sq mi)
- Discharge
  - location: Mouth (estimate)
  - average: 8.69 m^{3}/s (307 cu ft/s)
  - minimum: 37 m^{3}/s (1,300 cu ft/s)
  - maximum: 85.2 m^{3}/s (3,010 cu ft/s)

Basin features
- Progression: Baro → Sobat → White Nile → Nile → Mediterranean Sea
- River system: Nile Basin
- Cities: Mattar
- Population: 53,000
- Tributaries
  - left: Ubela
- Waterbodies: Alwero Dam

Alwero River (also spelt Aloru, Aluoro and Alwero) is a river in Abobo woreda of Gambela Region, Ethiopia. It flows through the Gambela National Park and through wetlands into the Openo/Baro River.

As of 2012 Saudi Star planned to divert significant amounts of water from the river through a 30 kilometres (19 mi) cement canal to irrigate rice.

== See also ==
- List of rivers of Ethiopia
