= Majang people =

Majangir
Total population
- 32,822 (2007)

Regions with significant populations
- Ethiopia

Languages
- Majang

Religion
- Christianity, Traditional religion

The Majang people, or Majangir, live in southwestern Ethiopia and speak a Nilo-Saharan language of the Surmic cluster. The 2007 Ethiopian census reported 32,822 Majangir people, though split between two spelling variants of their name, "Mejenger" and "Messengo". They live around cities of Tepi, Mett'i, and scattered southwest of Mizan Teferi and towards Gambela.

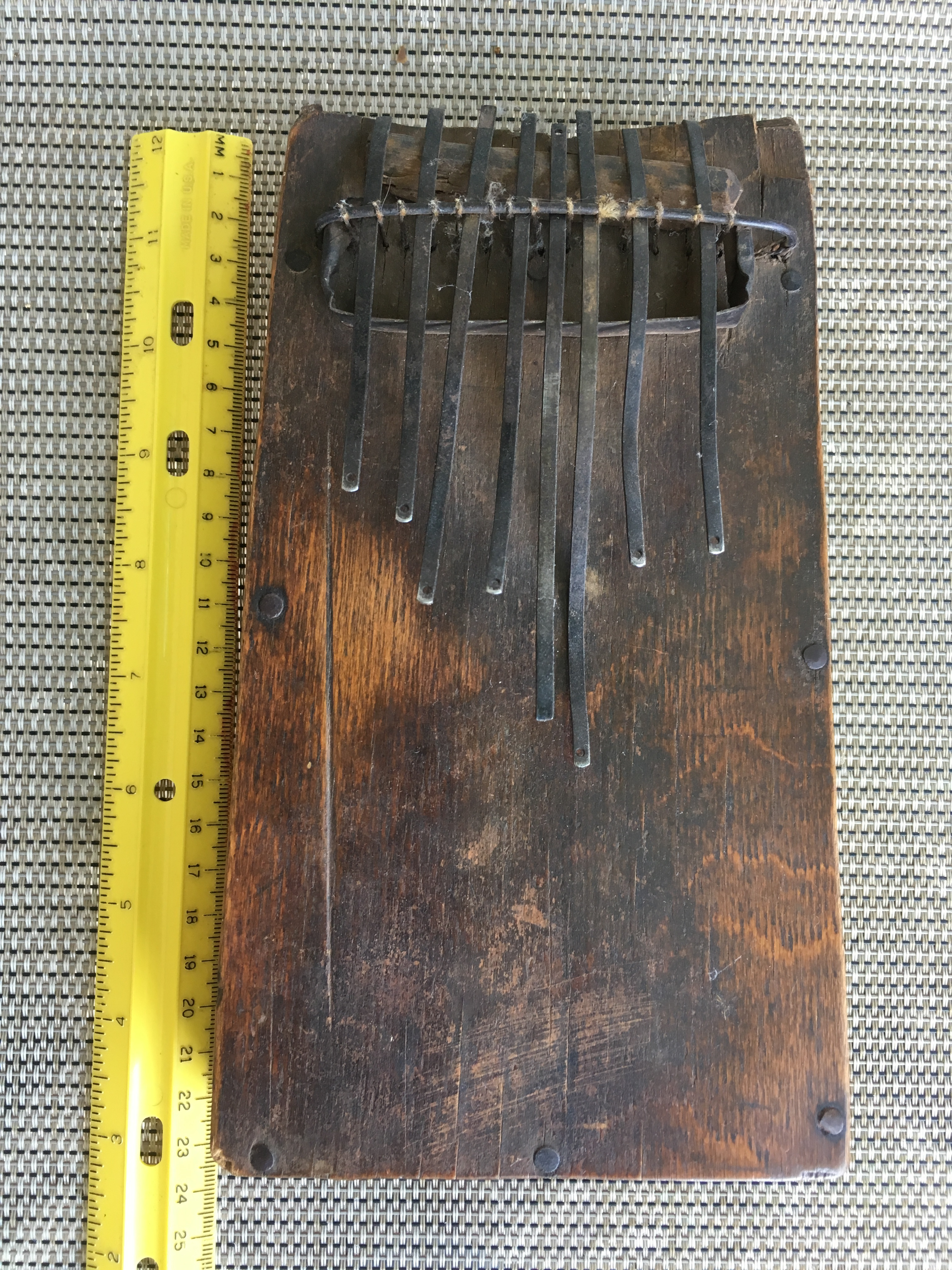
Traditional toom instrument

== Distribution ==
The largest Majangir area is located on the border of the Gambela and Oromia regions, including the Majang Zone, with the Anuak as their neighbors to their west, Shekkacho and Shabo to their east, and Sheko to their south, and reaching the town of Bure in the north. Smaller nearby areas of settlement are found east, just north of the town of Tepi. An area further south, at the border of Ethiopia and South Sudan, falls within the South West Ethiopia Peoples' Region, between the Anuak and the Me'en. A northern area is found in Oromia in the woreda of Anfillo, west of the town of Dembidolo and north of the city of Gambela.

== Culture ==
They traditionally lived in small groups, farming for three to five years, then moving on as the fertility of the soil diminished (Stauder 1971). They were active bee keepers, collecting honey from hives consisting of hollowed logs placed in trees. They did some hunting and snaring of game and trapping of fish. They raised the bulk of their own food by farming, animals providing only a small part of their diet.

Food production has changed since Stauder's time. The single most obvious change is that people are now living in permanent settlements. Livestock was not traditionally raised, but many Majangir have begun small scale livestock raising since about 1980. In addition, they have begun planting fruit and coffee trees, plants that take a number of years to produce a crop.

The Majangir traditionally had a very egalitarian society, with no standing political leaders (Stauder 1971, 1972). The only people in official positions were people in the role of tapaɗ (the final consonant is implosive), who served as ritual leaders. These were from the Meelanir clan, a group has links with similar-named privileged clans in other Surmic groups (Unseth and Abbink 1998). In case of a serious disagreement, one party would simply move away. There was no standard social reconciliation mechanism as is found in highland Ethiopian cultures.

The Majangir have over 70 clans, with clan identity passed down through the male line. A person cannot marry a person from the same clan (exogamy), nor should they marry a person from their mother's clan (Stauder 1971, Unseth 1998a).

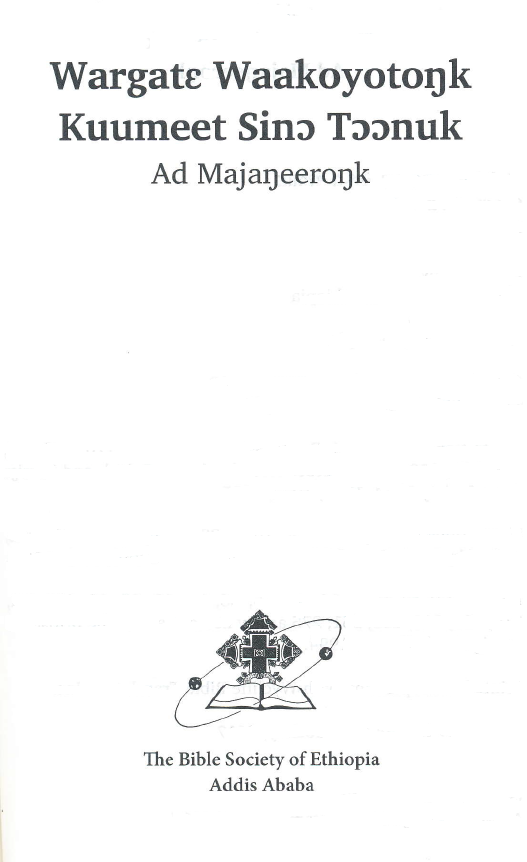
Title page of the New Testament in the Majang language, 2018

The Majangir traditionally made two kinds of alcoholic drink: tááján, made from grain (cf. tella) and ògòòl, made from honey (cf. tej; Teramoto et al., 2005).

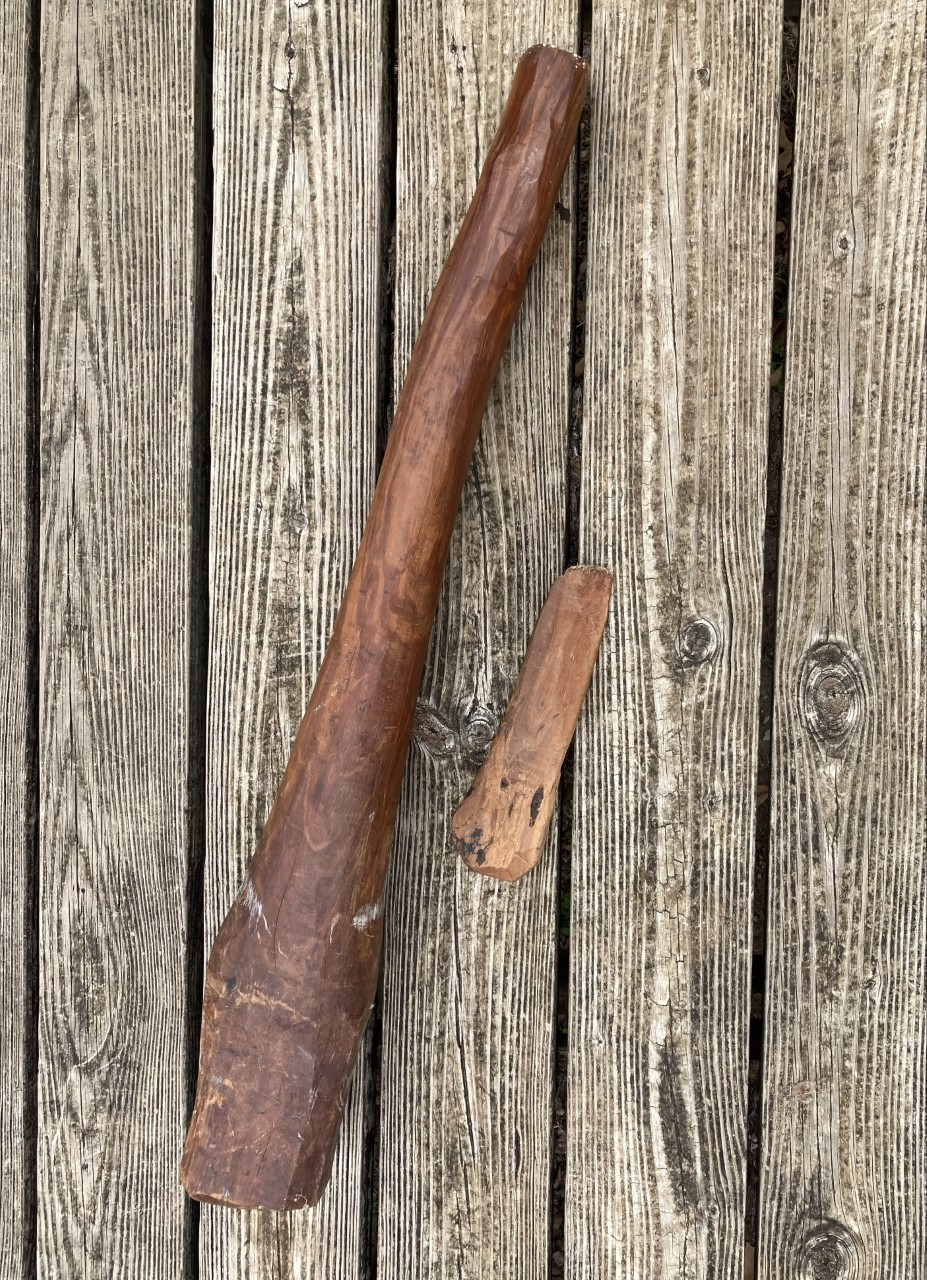
Traditional powaz mallet and wedge made of Baphia abyssinica wood.

The Majangir have traditionally used a number of musical instruments, sometimes to accompany singing and sometimes played without. Their instruments include a five-string lyre, thumb piano, drum, rattles, panflute. In addition, they play a vertically suspended marimba with as few as three wooden bars, but this is seen as a way of passing time, especially when guarding fields, rather than an instrument for music.

Their vocal music includes singing of both harmonies and antiphonal parts. Often, this results in two parts being sung by women and two parts by men.

Changes are happening rapidly to their traditional way of life. Since about 1971, many Majangir have become Christians (Hoekstra 2003 and Sato 2002). Further, since the end of the Ethiopian Civil War in 1991, with its subsequent remapping of Ethiopia by ethnic lines, the Majangir have felt very marginalized politically, their territory now divided among three kalil or administrative Regions (Sato 2000 and 2002). This frustration has led to some armed fighting with the government (Vaughan 2003:268).

Currently, many outsiders are buying or leasing land from the Majang area. "This has led to the pdivinationauperization of the Majang and the looming environmental disaster of the massive deforestation of the Majang forest, part of south-west Ethiopia’s dwindling tropical rain-forest."

They have traditions of divination. Some diviners scatter kernels of corn (maize) on the ground and then interpret the results. They also practice sandal divination, “The Masonga diviner (ngay), usually female, uses an instrument called a nyirukan, made from two pieces of buffalo hide joined by a metal ring”.. These pieces of leather are called [ ʃààmɛ́j ], an Amharic loan word for "sandals/shoes" The diviner tosses these pieces of leather into the air and then interprets the way they lie on the ground.

== Language ==
The Majangir language is part of the Surmic cluster, however it is the most isolated language in that cluster (Harold C. Fleming 1983). A language survey has shown that dialect variation from north to south is minor and does not seriously impede communication

The language has implosive consonants (bilabial and retroflex), but no ejective consonants (Bender 1983). There are seven vowels, and length of duration of the vowel is also distinctive, such as goopan 'punishment' and gopan 'road'. In addition, two tones also distinguish meaning, on both the word level and the grammatical level: táŋ (higher tone) 'cow', tàŋ (lower tone) 'abscess'.

== Bibliography ==
- Abate, Gutema Gizachew. "Land transactions between Majang people and ‘highlanders’ in the Majang forest zone: a case study of land registration in Ethiopia’s Gambella region." Africa 95, no. 1 (2025): 42-61.
- Bender, M. Lionel, 1983. "Majang Phonology and Morphology," in M. Lionel Bender, (ed.), Nilo-Saharan Language Studies, pp. 114–47. East Lansing, MI: Michigan State University, African Studies Center.
- Fleming, Harold, 1983. "Surmic etymologies" in Nilotic Studies: Proceedings of the International Symposium on Languages and History of the Nilotic Peoples, Rainer Vossen and Marianne Bechhaus-Gerst, 524–555. Berlin: Dietrich Reimer.
- Hoekstra, Harvey. 2003. From "knotted strings" to talking Bibles. Pasadena: William Carey Library.
- Joswig, Andreas (2019). The Majang Language (PhD thesis). The Netherlands: LOT (National Research School of Linguistics). ISBN 978-94-6093-321-9.
- Joswig, Andreas. "Syntactic sensitivity and preferred clause structure in Majang." Nilo-Saharan: models and descriptions (2015): 169-176.
- Sato, Ren'ya. 1995. "Seasonal Labor Allocation and Diversification Strategy of Sweden Agricultural System: A Report from the Majangir, Southwest Ethiopia," Human Geography 47: 541–561.
- Sato, Ren'ya, 1997a. "Christianization through Villagization: Experiences of Social Change among the Majangir," Ethiopia in Broader Perspective: Papers of 13th International Ethiopian Studies, vol.2.
- Sato, Ren'ya, 1997b. "Formation of Historical Consciousness among the Majangir : A Preliminary View with an Analysis of a narrative on the Majangir History," Swahili & African Studies.
- Sato, Ren'ya. 2000. "Ethiopian Decentralization and a Peripheral People : A Dispute Over Regional Borders and the Disruption of a Certain Development Project," Africa Report 30 12-15
- Sato, Ren'ya. 2002. "Evangelical Christianity and ethnic consciousness in Majangir." Remapping Ethiopia Socialism and After, edited by Wendy James, Donald L. Donham, Eisei Kurimoto, and Allesandro Triulzi, pp. 185–197. Oxford: James Currey Ltd.
- Sato, Ren'ya. 2003. Settlement dynamics of shifting cultivators, with special references to social factors of settlement abandonment. In H. Ishihara, ed., Studies of Agricultural Space (Noson Kukan no Kenyu) 1, 346–363. Tokyo: Taimedo. [in Japanese]
- Sato, Ren'ya. 2007. Dynamics of subsistence and reproduction among the Majangir. 16th International Conference of Ethiopian Studies. Trondheim, Norway. draft paper
- Stauder, Jack. 1971. The Majangir: Ecology and Society of a Southwest Ethiopian People. London: Cambridge University Press.
- Stauder, Jack. 1972. "Anarchy and Ecology: Political Society among the Majangir". Southwestern Journal of Anthropology 28.2, pp. 153–168.
- Tasew, Bayleyegn. "The Mythically Modelled Human–Environment Tradition of the Maǧaŋgir Society, South-Western Ethiopia." In Oral Traditions in Ethiopian Studies: Edited by Alexander Meckelburg, Sophia Dege-Müller, and Dirk Bustorf, 307–26. Wiesbaden: Harrassowitz Verlag, 2018. http://www.jstor.org/stable/j.ctvcm4fb5.17.
- Teramoto Y., Sato R., and Ueda S. 2005. "Characteristics of fermentation yeast isolated from traditional Ethiopian honey wine, ogol." African Journal of Biotechnology, 4 (2), pp. 160–163.
- Tuno, Nobuko. 2001. Mushroom utilization by the Majangir, an Ethiopian tribe. Mycologist 15(2):78-79.
- Unseth, Peter. 1988. "Majang Nominal Plurals: With Comparative Notes," Studies in African Linguistics 19.1:75-91.
- Unseth, Peter. 1989. "Sketch of Majang Syntax," Topics in Nilo-Saharan Linguistics, M. Lionel Bender, ed., pp. 97–127. (Nilo-Saharan: Linguistic Analyses and Documentation, vol. 3. Series editor Franz Rottland.) Hamburg: Helmut Buske Verlag.
- Unseth, Peter. 1998a. "Notes on Clan, Kinship, and Marriage Patterns Among the Majangir," in Surmic Languages and Cultures, ed. by Gerrit Dimmendaal, pp. 145–178. Köln: Köppe.
- Unseth, Peter. 1998b. "Two Old Causative Affixes in Surmic," Surmic Languages and Cultures, ed. by Gerrit Dimmendaal, pp. 113–126. Köln: Köppe.
- Unseth, Peter. 2007. "Majangir ethnography". Encyclopaedia Aethiopica, edited by Siegbert Uhlig, vol. 3, p. 629. Wiesbaden: Harrassowitz.
- Unseth, Peter and Jon Abbink. 1998. "Cross-ethnic Clan Identities Among Surmic Groups: The Case of the Mela," in Surmic Languages and Cultures, ed. by Gerrit Dimmendaal, pp. 103–112. Köln: Köppe.
- Vaughan, Sarah. 2003. "Ethnicity and Power in Ethiopia." Doctoral dissertation, University of Edinburgh.
