= Gilo River =

River in Ethiopia

Gilo River Mene, Owis, Bako
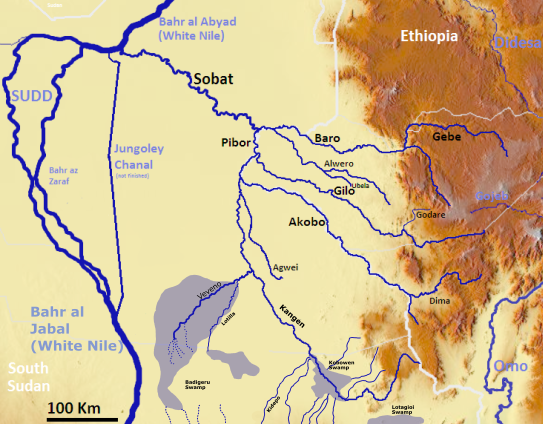
- Map of the Sobat basin, showing the Gilo River

Location
- Country: Ethiopia
- Regions: Gambela, Oromia, SWEPR

Physical characteristics
- Source
  - coordinates: 7°21′06″N 35°42′29″E
  - elevation: 2,251 m (7,385 ft)
- Source confluence
  - coordinates: 7°7′9.5″N 35°17′57.8″E
- Mouth: Pibor River
  - coordinates: 8°8′29.8″N 33°11′31.2″E
  - elevation: 406 m (1,332 ft)
- Length: 444 km (276 mi)
- Basin size: 12,228 km^{2} (4,721 sq mi)
- Discharge
  - location: Mouth
  - average: 69.8 m^{3}/s (2,460 cu ft/s)
  - minimum: 19.8 m^{3}/s (700 cu ft/s)
  - maximum: 162 m^{3}/s (5,700 cu ft/s)

Basin features
- Progression: Pibor → Sobat → White Nile → Nile → Mediterranean Sea
- River system: Nile
- Population: 1,050,000

The Gilo River is a river in the Gambela Region of southwestern Ethiopia. A variety of names also knows it: the Gimira of Dizu call it the "Mene", while the Gemira of Chako call it "Owis", and Amhara and Oromo settlers in the early 20th century knew it by a third name, "Bako". From its source in the Ethiopian Highlands near Mizan Teferi it flows to the west, through Lake Tata to join the Pibor River on Ethiopia's border with Sudan. The combined waters then join the Sobat River and the White Nile.

The Gilo River flows mainly through the Baro Salient, a portion of Ethiopia that juts westward into Sudan. The river valley was subjected to much prospecting for gold before World War II and in the 1950s, but not enough was found to make commercial extraction viable.

Burchard Heinrich Jessen, who was part of W.N. McMillan's expedition that traveled through this part of southwestern Ethiopia in 1904, estimated its length at 200 miles and noted that at flood the width of the Gilo reaches 80 to 100 yards, with a depth of about 20 feet. Jessen further wrote that at the time of his visit:

The river abounds with fish, and as a natural consequence, the crocodiles are very numerous and large. At midday, practically every sandbank is covered with them. It is a remarkable fact that the hippopotami are conspicuous by their absence, only one having been seen and killed many years ago, as these animals are plentiful everywhere in these countries.

— B H. Jessen, "South-Western Abyssinia", Geographical Journal (1905)

== See also ==
- List of Ethiopian rivers
