= Anuak Zone =

Zone in Gambela Region of Ethiopia

Coordinates: 8°N 35°E

Anyuak Zone or Anywaa Zone is a zone in Gambela Region of Ethiopia. It was created from former Administrative Zone 1 and Administrative Zone 2 of Gambela. This zone is bordered on the southwest by South Sudan, on the southeast by the Southern Nations, Nationalities, and Peoples Region, on the east by Majang Zone, on the northeast by the Oromia Region, and on the northwest by South Sudan and Nuer Zone. Towns in this zone include Gambela, Abwobo and Pinyudo.

The terrain is mostly flat; rivers include the Baro, which is the only navigable river in Ethiopia, the Alworo and the Gilo; major bodies of water include Lakes Alworo and Thatha. A notable landmark is the Gambela National Park, which covers a large part of the Zone south of the Baro.

== Demographics ==
Based on the 2007 Census conducted by the Central Statistical Agency of Ethiopia (CSA), this Zone has a total population of 99,556, of whom 50,722 are men and 48,834 women. 52,561 or 52.8% of population are urban inhabitants. A total of 24,490 households were counted in this Zone, which results in an average of 4.07 persons to a household. The largest ethnic groups of the zone were the Anyuak (66.7%), the Oromo (9.14%), the Amhara (9.1%), Kambaata (4.35%), Mezhenger (2.3%), Tigray (2.19%), Welayta (1.52%), Gurage (1.4%), and Hadiya (1.19%); all other ethnic groups made up 3.44% of the population. Anywaa is spoken as a first language by 66.7%, 11.33% Amharic, 8.59% Oromo, 4.47% speak Kambaata, 1.96% speak Tigrinya, 1.45% speak Wolaytta, 1.1% speak Hadiyya, and 1.09% speak Guragie; the remaining 3.31% spoke all other primary languages reported. The largest group of the inhabitants said they were Protestant, with 64.81% of the population reporting they embraced that belief, while 29.16% professed Ethiopian Orthodox Christianity, 5.61% were Catholic, 5.3% were Muslim, and 2.2% practiced traditional religions.

There is 1 refugee camp, housing 29,912 refugees from South Sudan, located in Anywaa Zone.
