= Gambela (city) =

Capital of Gambela Region, Ethiopia

Gambela ጋምቤላ
- Capital city
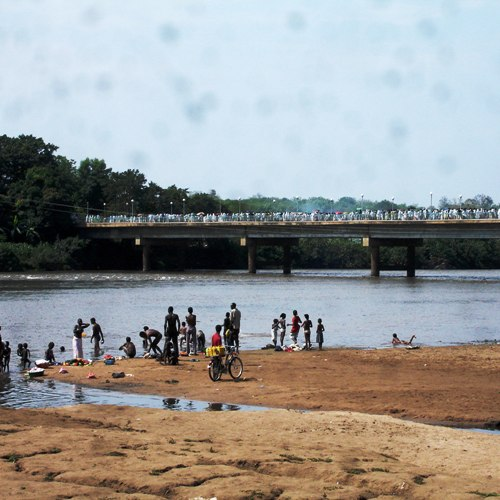
- Baro River in Gambela

- Location within Ethiopia Location within the Horn of Africa Location within Africa
- Coordinates: 8°15′N 34°35′E
- Country: Ethiopia
- Region: (Gambela Region) Gambela
- Zone: Gambella
- Elevation: 526 m (1,726 ft)

Population (2022)
  - Total: 97,643
- Time zone: UTC+3 (EAT)
- Climate: Aw

Gambela (Amharic: ጋምቤላ), also spelled Gambella, is a city and separate woreda in Ethiopia and the capital of the Gambela Region. Located in Anyuak Zone, at the confluence of the Baro River and its tributary the Jajjabe, the city has a latitude and longitude of 8°15′N 34°35′E and an elevation of 526 meters. It is surrounded by Gambella Zuria.

Gambela is important because bridges over both the Openo and the Jajjaba are located in that city. The town also boasts an airport (ICAO code HAGM, IATA GMB) and is near the Gambella National Park.

== History ==
Gambela was founded because of its location on the Baro, a tributary of the Nile, which was seen by both the British and the Ethiopians as an excellent highway for exporting coffee and other goods from the fertile Ethiopian Highlands to Sudan and Egypt.

=== British concession (1902–1956) ===
Emperor Menelik II granted Britain use of a port along the Baro on 15 May 1902, and in 1907 the port and a customs station were founded at Gambela.

A shipping service run by Sudan Railways linked Khartoum with Gambela, a distance of 1,366 kilometers. According to Richard Pankhurst, by the mid-1930s boats sailed twice a month during the rainy season, taking seven days downstream and eleven upstream.

According to Bahru Zewde, British interest in the concession was due in part to the attraction of "tapping the allegedly fabulous commercial potential of Western Ethiopia and drawing the whole region into the economic orbit of the Sudan", but also intended "to be a brilliant British countermove to avert the virtual commercial hegemony in Ethiopia that the Djibouti-Addis Ababa Railway seemed to promise the French." In fact, it benefitted the Abyssinians themselves not to have their economy in the control of a single European power, whether French, British or even Italian, and Menelik was playing a clever game of pitting his colonial neighbours against each other, to avoid any single one gaining a monopoly, whilst opening his country to the benefits of trade and technology, as part of a major modernisation drive. Although over 70% of Ethiopia's external trade passed through the port at Djibouti between 1911 and 1917, the share of goods passing through Gambela had the fastest rate of growth until the Italian conquest.

The British did have to cope with the Ethiopian governors of Sayo and Gore, who showed a keen interest in the money to be made in the cross-border trade. A small detachment of troops from the nominal condominium of the Anglo-Egyptian Sudan was posted to Gambela to maintain order and security within the concession and defend it from outside interests in what was still a largely lawless country, following numerous Egyptian, Islamist, British and Italian interventions, and a consequent breakdown of civil authority, over the previous decades.

The Regent Ras Tafari (the later Emperor Haile Selassie), beginning on 9 July 1927, granted a number of concessions to T. Zervos and A. Danalis to construct a road 180 kilometers in length to connect Gambela with the towns of Metu and Gore.

The British Concession was not directly affected by the Italian invasion of Ethiopia in 1935 but when Italian East Africa was formally established in 1936, the Ethiopian concession was deemed to have lapsed. The shipping service suspended and the steamer, together with the British resident, left Gambela on 14 October. With the river traffic now gone, the Italians provided an alternative link for the town, by building a further road from Gambela, this one to Nekemte, between 1936 and 1940. Gambela was taken from the Italians by the 2/6 King's African Rifles on 3 February 1941. The property of the British buildings were reported to have been respected and left intact during the peacetime and wartime Italian administration. The original Resident returned, but the Concession was no longer distinctive, as the whole country remained under British administration, the Occupied Enemy Territory Administration (OETA), for a number of years, until sufficient Ethiopian administrators had been trained.

Lij Tewodros, a son of Lij Iyasu, surfaced in the Gambela area in May 1941 proclaiming himself Emperor. His insurrection was put down by Belgian Congo troops before they left the area in February 1942.

A new Anglo-Ethiopian treaty was signed on 19 December 1944 which virtually eliminated British privileges, but the Gambela enclave continued. The Ethiopian government gradually increased its control over the enclave: outlawing the Maria Theresa Thaler as legal tender, requiring all merchants to obtain passports in person in Addis Ababa, and in 1951 informing the British resident, Captain Dribble, that he could no longer judge or imprison anyone. When he departed on 30 October 1954, the end of the enclave was in sight. The enclave was still held by the Sudanese when they achieved independence, but they did not agree to hand the enclave back to Ethiopia until 15 October 1956. The word Gambela is originally from Anuak language (Gam-bëëla) which means "to catch a male leopard." Gam means "to catch something" Bëëla means "a Male Leopard"

=== Recent history ===
The port was closed during the Derg era, and as of 2005 it remains closed due to tension between the Sudan People's Liberation Army and the Ethiopian government, though there are hopes to reopen the port.

The Ethiopian People's Revolutionary Democratic Front announced on 27 May 1991 that they had gained control of Gambela.

On 13 December 2003, in an apparent reprisal for a series of ambushes of highlander civilians, 30 Ethiopian soldiers and highlander civilians launched a brutal attack on Gambela's Anuak population. Human Rights Watch has estimated that 424 people were killed. An armed Anuak group (which John Young speculates is the Gambela People's Liberation Movement) attacked a prison in the capital 30 October 2005, freeing inmates, and killing the police commissioner.

In March 2012, a bus was attacked, with 19 people on board being shot dead.

== Demographics ==
Based on the 2007 Census conducted by the Central Statistical Agency of Ethiopia, Gambela has a total population of 39,022, an increase of 113.67% over the 1994 census, of whom 20,790 are men and 18,232 women. A total of 10,152 households were counted in this town, which results in an average of 3.8 persons to a household, and 9,595 housing units. The majority of the inhabitants said they were Protestant, with 57.04% of the population reporting they observed this belief, while 30.39% of the population practised Ethiopian Orthodox Christianity, 9% were Muslim, and 4.08% were Catholic.

According to the 1994 national census, its total population was 18,263 of whom 9852 were males and 8411 were females. The ethnic breakdown was 33.8% Nuer, 26.1% Anuak, 14% Oromo, 7.4% Amhara, 6.5% Tigray, 4.3% Kambaata, and 4.9% all others.

== Economy ==
Gambella's economy is driven by agriculture, livestock farming, fishing, and mineral resources. While subsistence farming is common, commercial farms like Karuturi Global offer jobs and lower food prices. Local farmers, encouraged by government projects, grow maize and sorghum and sell their produce in urban markets. Livestock farming, prevalent in areas like Akobo and Jikawo, faces challenges such as drought, limited grazing land, and cattle rustling from South Sudan, yet it remains vital to the economy. Rich in minerals, Gambella boasts long-established gold mines in Dimma and newly discovered oil fields, promising economic growth. Abundant water resources from rivers like Akobo, Baro, and Gilo, along with numerous lakes, support a thriving fishing industry, providing a crucial source of income for many residents.

== Climate ==
Climate data for Gambela, elevation 480 m (1,570 ft)
Month	Jan	Feb	Mar	Apr	May	Jun	Jul	Aug	Sep	Oct	Nov	Dec	Year
Mean daily maximum °C (°F)	38.3 (100.9)	40.1 (104.2)	40.5 (104.9)	38.7 (101.7)	34.8 (94.6)	33.6 (92.5)	32.5 (90.5)	32.5 (90.5)	33.4 (92.1)	34.5 (94.1)	35.1 (95.2)	36.9 (98.4)	35.9 (96.6)
Mean daily minimum °C (°F)	20.4 (68.7)	22.1 (71.8)	23.9 (75.0)	24.2 (75.6)	22.7 (72.9)	22.0 (71.6)	21.7 (71.1)	21.4 (70.5)	21.5 (70.7)	21.2 (70.2)	21.1 (70.0)	20.5 (68.9)	21.9 (71.4)
Average precipitation mm (inches)	2.8 (0.11)	3.6 (0.14)	24.1 (0.95)	66.6 (2.62)	174.8 (6.88)	151.1 (5.95)	200.0 (7.87)	195.3 (7.69)	177.7 (7.00)	124.5 (4.90)	57.5 (2.26)	11.6 (0.46)	1,189.6 (46.83)
Average relative humidity (%)	46	43	45	51	61	71	79	79	73	68	57	54	61
Source 1: Ethiopian Meteorological Institute
Source 2: FAO (humidity)
