= Wards of Ethiopia =

Smallest administrative unit of Ethiopia

In Ethiopia, a ward or kebele (Amharic: ቀበሌ, romanized: kʼebelē; Oromo: Gandaa; Tigrinya: ታቢያ, romanized: tābiyā, lit. 'neighbourhood') is the smallest administrative unit: a ward, a neighbourhood or a localized and delimited group of people. It is part of a district, which is typically part of a zone, which in turn are grouped into the regions or chartered cities that comprise the Federal Democratic Republic of Ethiopia.

Each ward consists of at least 500 families, the equivalent of 3,500 to 4,000 people. Every town with more than 2,000 population has at least one. A district's representative had jurisdiction over its wards.

== History ==
The ward, also referred to as a peasant association, was created by the Derg in 1975 to promote development and to manage land reform; wards became a key element that the rival Ethiopian People's Revolutionary Party and MEISON fought over. The ruling Derg used them to exert control during the Ethiopian Red Terror. Wards were retained as administrative units by the Transitional Government of Ethiopia upon the conclusion of the Ethiopian Civil War in 1991; ever since, their administrative role has expanded to include service provision. As Human Rights Watch noted, ward officials determine eligibility for food assistance, recommend referrals to secondary health care and schools, and help provide access to state-distributed resources such as seeds, fertilizers, credit, and other essential agricultural inputs."

== Structure and function ==
The lowest level of local government with limited autonomy are the wards. They operate at the neighbourhood level and are the primary contact for most Ethiopians. Their administrative unit consists of an elected council, a cabinet (executive committee), a social court and development and security staff. Wards are accountable to their woreda councils and are typically responsible for basic education, primary health care, agriculture, water, and rural roads. Wards are headed by cadres loyal to the political coalition. Therefore, they can observe the population on behalf of the central government. The system is becoming less and less functional at lower levels in urban communities. OPDO in Oromia introduced a sub-ward system in 2001, but it did not fully become operational until the 2005 elections.

== See also ==
- Subdivisions of Ethiopia
