= Gambela Region =

Regional state in western Ethiopia

Coordinates: 7°37′06″N 34°41′22″E

Gambela Peoples' Region Gambëlla
- Regional state
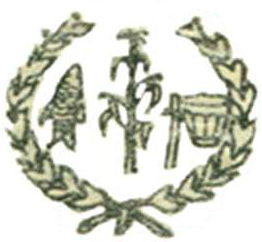
- Flag Seal

- Map of Ethiopia showing Gambela Region
- Country: Ethiopia
- Established: 1992
- Capital: Gambela

Government
  - Chief Administrator: Alemithu Omod (Prosperity Party)

Area
  - Total: 29,782.82 km^{2} (11,499.21 sq mi)
  - Rank: 9th

Population (2025)
  - Total: 496,000
  - Rank: 10th
  - Density: 16.7/km^{2} (43.1/sq mi)
- ISO 3166 code: ET-GA
- HDI (2019): 0.566 medium · 4th of 11

The Gambela Region, (Note: Also spelled Gambella and Gambëlla) officially the Gambela Peoples' Region, (Note: Amharic: ጋምቤላ ሕዝቦች ክልል) is a regional state in western Ethiopia. Previously known as Region 12, its capital and largest city is Gambela. It is bordered by the Oromia Region to the east, the South West Ethiopia Region to the south, and the country of South Sudan to the west.

Gambela is situated between the Openo and Akobo Rivers, with its western part including the Openo River. It covers an area of approximately 29,783 square kilometers with a population of 525,000 inhabitants, making it one of Ethiopia's smallest regions and one of its least populous. Gambela is home to a diverse population which includes several indigenous ethnic groups.

== History ==
This region served as slave-hunting grounds by Christian Abyssinians for centuries, and the Nilosaharan-speaking inhabitants were pejoratively called Shanqella (Šanqəlla, also Shanqila, Shankella) by the highland Ethiopians.

The Gambella region has been a strategic point in the relations between Ethiopia and the Sudan since the end of the 19th century when the border between Ethiopia and the Anglo-Egyptian Sudan was drawn in 1902, the present day Gambella region was confirmed as an Ethiopian territory.

Lij Tewodros, a son of Lij Iyasu, surfaced in the Gambela area in May 1941 proclaiming himself Emperor. His insurrection was put down by Belgian Congo troops before they left the area in February 1942.

== Demographics ==
Based on the 2007 Census conducted by the Central Statistical Agency of Ethiopia (CSA), the Gambela region has total population of 307,096, consisting of 159,787 men and 147,309 women; urban inhabitants number 77,925 or 25.37% of the population. With an estimated area of 29,782.82 square kilometers, this region has an estimated density of 10 people per square kilometer. For the entire region, 66,467 households were counted, which results in an average for the region of 4.6 persons to household, with urban households having on average 3.8 and rural households 4.9 people. Various Nilotic ethnic minority groups mainly inhabit the Gambela region: Anuak (Anywaa), Nuer, Majang and others.

In 1994, the national census reported the region's population to be 181,862 in 35,940 households, of whom 92,902 were men and 88,960 women; 27,424 or 15.08% were urban inhabitants. (This total also includes an estimate for all 19 kebeles of one woreda and six kebeles in two other woredas, which were not counted; these areas were estimated to have 19,465 inhabitants, of whom 9,203 were men and 10,262 women.) The six largest ethnic groups of the region were Anuak (Anywaa), Nuer, Amhara, Oromo, Majang, Komo and other ethnic groups. Languages spoken are Anuak, Nuer, Amharic, Afaan Oromo, Majang; the remaining spoke all other primary languages reported. The projected population for 2017 was 435,999.

Values for reported common indicators of the standard of living for Nuer as of 2005 include the following: 44% of the inhabitants fall into the lowest wealth quintile; adult literacy for men is 57.5% and for women 22.8%; and the regional infant mortality rate is 92 infant deaths per 1,000 live births, which is greater than the nationwide average of 77; at least half of these deaths occurred in the infants’ first month of life.

=== Religion ===
Religion in Nuer Region (2007)
1. Christian/P'ent'ay (90.0%)
2. Ethiopian Orthodox (5.00%)
3. Muslim (3.00%)
4. Traditional faiths (1.00%)
5. Catholic (1.00%)
6. Other (0.00%)

90% of the region's population are Protestants, 5% Orthodox, 3% Muslim, 1% practice traditional religions, and 1% are Catholic.

== Refugee camps ==
There are a number of refugee camps located in Gambela region housing around 268,000 refugees from South Sudan in August 2016:

	Nguenyyie	Pinyudo	Pinyudo	Tierkidi	AKula	Jawi	Leitchuor	Okugo
2016 numbers	–	~62,800	–	~54,750	~49,410	~42,570	~4,480	–
2018 numbers	~83,660	~66,400	~17,300	~71,100	~53,340	~60,060	–	~13,630

From August 2016 to August 2018, the numbers increased from 268,000 to 402,000 refugees, almost equaling the native population of Gambela Region.

== Economy ==
The CSOA reported that for 2025-2026 3,734 tons of coffee were produced in Gambela, based on inspection records from the Ethiopian Coffee and Tea authority. This represents 1.64% of the total production in Ethiopia. The CSA could not provide livestock estimates for Gambela. In a 26 May 2000 report, the FAO observed that at the time trypanosomiasis was a major problem in cattle for this region. There had been an epidemic of this disease in the area during 1970.

Gambela is believed to have major oil resources. In June 2003, the Ethiopian government signed an agreement with Petronas of Malaysia for the joint exploration and development of oil resources in Gambella region. Petronas then awarded a contract for seismic data acquisition to China's Zhongyuan Petroleum Exploration Bureau (ZPEB) in October of that year.

The Water and Mines Resources Development Bureau of Gambela announced January 2007 that it was initiating a program that would drill 13 new manually operated wells, 54 new deep water wells, and develop four springs. This would provide access to drinking water for 26,000 inhabitants, increasing coverage for the state to 42 percent from the existing 27 percent, at a cost of 6 million Birr. Construction of an asphalt road 102 kilometers in length and connecting Gambela City with Jikawo by way of Itang was begun in 2008 with a budget over 446 million Birr.

As of 2015, Indian investors have acquired 6,000 square km of land in the Gambela region, following other investors, for agricultural land from the central government. This has led to conflict with regional government officials and local communities. Not all the land is actually being farmed, as per the agreement, and there are accusations of investors illegally clearing trees in the Gambella National Park in a blog.

== Administrative subdivisions ==
While Gambela is subdivided into administrative zones and woredas as other regions in Ethiopia are, this region has seen the most changes in these subdivisions of any region, to the point they can confuse anyone tracing their development. Originally, Gambela was subdivided into four administrative zones without proper names (1, 2, 3 and 4) and one special woreda (Godere special woreda). By 2001, when the CSA released its Sample Agricultural Enumeration, these four zones had been combined into two, and Godere had been merged into the second administrative zone.

By the 2007 census, Gambela had been redivided into three zones (named for the three largest ethnic groups), and the area around Itang town had been made a special woreda; borders of existing woredas were moved around to create several new ones within the zones. These zones are:

- Anywaa Zone
- Majang Zone
- Nuer Zone
- Itang

. The terrain is mostly flat at elevations between 400 – 550 meters above sea level but with the eastern fringes of Anywaa Zone and in particular the easternmost zone, Majang, being partly in the highlands and rising to an elevation of ~2000 meters near the eastern border.

== Towns ==
There are 13 towns in the Gambela Region.

Town	Population 2007	Zone/Special Woreda
Abobo	4,090	Agnewak
Abol	1,096	Agnewak
Dima	2,103	Agnewak
Etang	5,958	Etang
Gambela	39,022	Gambella tribes
Kowerneng	7,949	Nuer
Metar	7,702	Nuer
Meti	7,140	Mejenger
Nginngang	9'161	Nuer
Pigniwedo	5,617	Agnewak
Shintawa	633	Agnewak
Tergol	3,095	Nuer
Jekawo	6'040	Nuer

== Governors and chairmen of the ruling party ==
Governor and chairman of the ruling party in Gambela region 1991–2018:

- Agwa Alemu (GPLM) 1991 – 1992
- Okello Oman (GPLM) 1992 – 1997
- Okello Gnigelo (GPDF) August 1997 – 2003
- Okello Akway 2003 – 2004
- Keat Tuach Bithow (acting) January 2004 – 2005
- Omod Obong (GPDM) 29 September 2005 – April 2013
- Gatluak Tut Khot (GPDM) April 2013 – October 2018
- Omod Ojulu Obub (Prosperity Party) October 2018 – present

(This list is based on information from Worldstatesmen.org.)

- Alemithu Omod (GPDM) 15 August 2024 – present

== See also ==
- Gambela conflict
