= Baro River =

River in southwestern Ethiopia

Baro River Openo
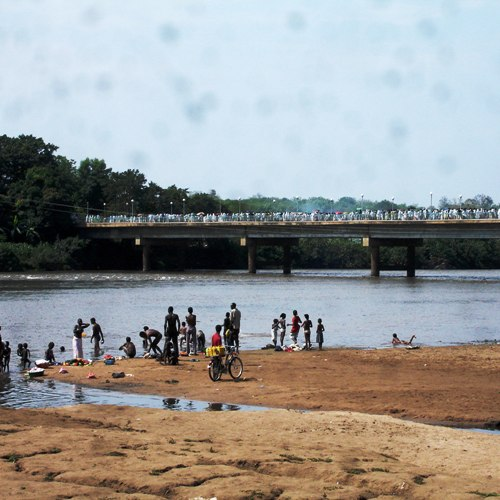
- Akobo Bridge in Gambela

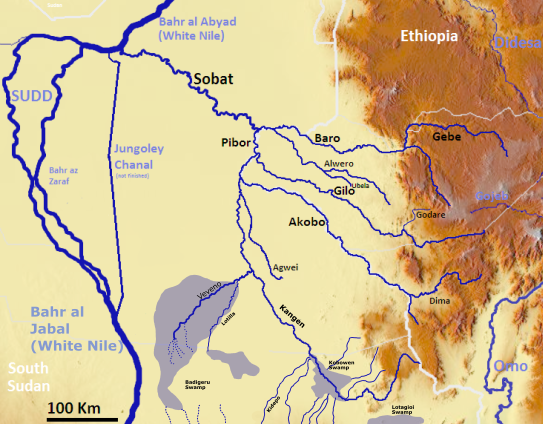
- Sobat River basin showing the Baro River
- Native name: ባሮ ወንዝ (Amharic)

Location
- Countries: Ethiopia; South Sudan

Physical characteristics
- Source: Birbir River
  - location: Dibdib, Ethiopia
  - coordinates: 7°42′04″N 35°52′44″E
  - elevation: 2,367 m (7,766 ft)
- 2nd source: Gebba River
  - location: Acchiscio, Ethiopia
  - coordinates: 7°47′13″N 35°50′38″E
  - elevation: 2,267 m (7,438 ft)
- Source confluence
  - location: Seriti, Ethiopia
  - coordinates: 8°14′28″N 34°57′39″E
  - elevation: 557 m (1,827 ft)
- Mouth: Sobat River
  - location: Jikmir, South Sudan
  - coordinates: 8°26′05″N 33°13′13″E
  - elevation: 404 m (1,325 ft)
- Length: 306 km (190 mi), 560 km (350 mi) (including tributaries)
- Basin size: 41,400 km^{2} (16,000 sq mi)
- Discharge
  - location: Mouth
  - average: 241 m^{3}/s (8,500 cu ft/s)
  - minimum: 77.98 m^{3}/s (2,754 cu ft/s)
  - maximum: 634.41 m^{3}/s (22,404 cu ft/s)

Basin features
- Progression: Sobat River → White Nile → Nile → Mediterranean Sea
- River system: Nile Basin
- Population: 3,260,000
- Tributaries
  - left: Birbir, Alwero
  - right: Gebba, Jikawo

The Baro River (Amharic: ባሮ ወንዝ) or Baro/Openo Wenz, known to the Anuak as Openo River, is a river in southwestern Ethiopia, which defines part of Ethiopian border with South Sudan. From its source in the Ethiopian Highlands it flows west for 306 kilometres (190 mi) to join the Pibor River. The Baro-Pibor confluence marks the beginning of the Sobat River, a tributary of the White Nile.

The Baro and its tributaries drain a watershed 41,400 km^{2} (16,000 sq mi) in size. The river's mean annual discharge at its mouth is 241 m³/s (8,510 ft³/s).

== Course ==
The Baro/Openo river is created by the confluence of the Birbir and Gebba Rivers, east of Metu in the Illubabor Zone of the Oromia Region. It then flows west through the Gambela Region to join with the Pibor River, both of them creating the Sobat. Other notable tributaries of the Baro/Openo include the Alwero and Jikawo Rivers. The Baro meets the Pibor river to the west of Jikawo. During the rainy season the river floods to form a huge inundated area to the east and south of Jikawo, previously penetrating as far as Abobo and Gog to the east and south-east. Baro is the wettest lowland river and the most navigable. The Khor Machar is a distributary of the Baro which feeds the Machar Marshes.

== Natural history ==
Of the Sobat River's tributaries, the Baro/Openo River is by far the largest, contributing 83% of the total water flowing into the Sobat. During the rainy season, between June and October, the Baro River alone contributes about 10% of the Nile's water at Aswan, Egypt. In contrast, these rivers have very low flow during the dry season.

== History ==
The boundary between Sudan and Ethiopia was defined for the region near the Baro/Openo River in 1899 by Major H.H. Austin and Major Charles W. Gwynn of the British Royal Engineers. They had no knowledge of the land, its inhabitants, or their languages, and were short on supplies. Rather than defining a line based on ethnic groups and traditional territories, essentially along the escarpment that separates the highlands and the plains, they simply proposed drawing the line down the middle of the Akobo River and parts of the Pibor and Baro rivers. This boundary was consummated in the Anglo-Ethiopian Treaty of 1902, resulting in an area in Ethiopian Gambela Region called the Baro/Openo Salient. This area is more closely connected to South Sudan than Ethiopia, both in terms of natural features and people. The Baro Salient was used as a sanctuary by Sudanese insurgents during the country's long civil wars. It was difficult for Sudan to exert authority over a region that is part of Ethiopia, and Ethiopia was reluctant to police this remote region and become involved in the politics of Sudan's internal conflicts.

Vittorio Bottego, who explored the area in the later 1890s, proposed naming the river after Admiral Simone Antonio Saint-Bon.

The only navigable river in Ethiopia, the Baro's most important city is Gambela, which served as a port from 1907 until the 1990s when civil war in Ethiopia and Sudan forced shipping on the river to be halted.

The Italian L. Usoni unsuccessfully prospected for gold in the Baro river valley, and published his findings in 1952.

The second-longest bridge in Ethiopia crosses the Baro, connecting two parts of the Gambela Region. This bridge is 305 meters long.

== See also ==
- List of rivers of Ethiopia
- List of rivers of South Sudan
