= Anuak language =

Luo language spoken by Anuak people in western Ethiopia and South Sudan

Anuak
- Dha Anywaa
- Native to: Ethiopia, South Sudan
- Region: Gambela, Greater Upper Nile
- Ethnicity: Anuak
- Native speakers: 220,000 (2007–2017)
- Language family: Nilo-Saharan?: Eastern Sudanic; Southern Eastern; Nilotic; Western; Luo; Northern; Anuak
- Writing system: Ge'ez, Latin

Language codes
- ISO 639-3: anu
- Glottolog: anua1242

Anuak or Anywaa is a Luo language which belongs to the western Nilotic branch of the Nilotic language family. It is spoken primarily in the western part of Ethiopia and also in South Sudan by the Anuak people. Other names for this language include: Anyuak, Anywa, Yambo, Jambo, Yembo, Bar, Burjin, Miroy, Moojanga, Nuro. Anuak, Päri, and Jur-Luwo comprise a dialect cluster. The most thorough description of the Anuak language is Reh (1996) Anywa Language: Description and Internal Reconstructions, which also includes glossed texts.

== Phonology ==
Anuak is notable for lacking phonemic fricatives.

=== Consonants ===
		Labial	Dental	Alveolar	Palatal	Velar
Nasal		m	n̪	n	ɲ	ŋ
Plosive/ affricate	fortis	p	t̪	t	c	k
Plosive/ affricate	lenis	b	d̪	d	ɟ	ɡ
Approximant		w		l	j	
Trill				r		

=== Vowels ===
	Front	Back	
	Front	Unrounded	Rounded
Close	i iː		u uː
Near-Close	ɪ ɪː		ʊ ʊː
Close-mid	e eː		o oː
Open-mid	ɛ ɛː	ʌ ʌː	ɔ ɔː
Open	a aː		

=== Diphthongs ===
	Front	Back
Close	ie	uo
Near-Close	ɪɛ	ʊɔ

=== Tones ===
Description	IPA
Rising	˩˥
High	˦
Mid	˧
Low	˨
