= Catholic Church in Ethiopia =

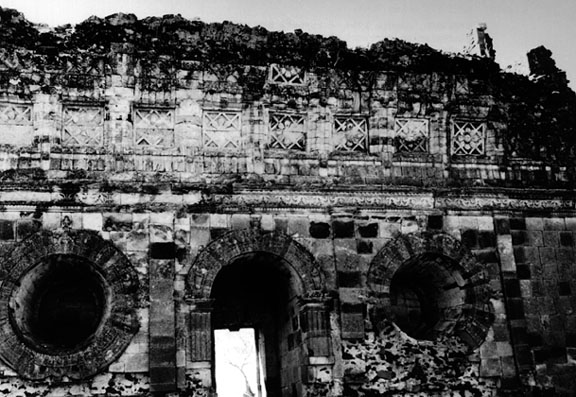
Seventeenth-century Portuguese Catholic church in Gorgora.

The Catholic Church in Ethiopia is part of the worldwide Catholic Church, under the spiritual leadership of the pope in Rome.

The Eastern Rite Ethiopian Catholic Church, the primary Catholic rite in the country, bases its liturgy and teaching on that of the Ethiopian Orthodox Tewahedo Church, modified to be in accordance with the Catholic dogma. While separated by their understanding of the primacy of the Bishop of Rome and their Christology, the Ethiopian Catholic and Orthodox Churches have basically the same sacraments and liturgy. As of 2017, there were 70,832 members of the Ethiopian Catholic Church. There are also a small number of Latin-Rite Catholics in the country, primarily Italian Ethiopians.

== History ==
Saint Frumentius (Abune Salama Kesatie Berhan), the first Bishop of Ethiopia, was consecrated by Saint Athanasius, Patriarch of Alexandria around 341. Following the Council of Chalcedon in 451, the Coptic Church of Alexandria was no longer in communion with the Roman Catholic and Eastern Orthodox churches.

Between the 13th and 18th centuries, the Roman Catholic Church sent various missions to Ethiopia. Most of these were directed less at the conversion of non-Christians, but at securing the adhesion to the Holy See of the existing Church. They eventually failed due to the attachment of most Ethiopians to the Ethiopian Orthodox Tewahedo Church, which was strongly linked to national identity and whose Miaphysite theology was incompatible with that of Rome

The Portuguese voyages of discovery at the end of the fifteenth century opened the way for direct contacts between the Church in Rome and the Church in Ethiopia. In the mid-16th century, Ethiopian rulers allowed Jesuits to proselytize in the country. However, the conversion of rulers Za Dengel and Susenyos to Catholicism in the early 17th century led to uprisings. Due to the behaviour of the Portuguese Jesuit Afonso Mendes, whom Pope Urban VIII appointed as Patriarch of Ethiopia in 1622, Emperor Fasilides expelled the Patriarch and the European missionaries under penalty of death, who included Jerónimo Lobo, from the country in 1636; these contacts, which had seemed destined for success under the previous Emperor led, instead, to the complete closure of Ethiopia to further contact with Rome.

From 1839 Msgr. Justin de Jacobis, and subsequently Cardinal Guglielmo Massaia, resumed Catholic missionary activities. The Catholic communities currently found in Ethiopia are mostly the fruit of the vigorous work of the above-mentioned missionaries, de Jacobis, and Cardinal Massaja.

== See also ==
- Christianity in Ethiopia
- Religion in Ethiopia
- Archdiocese of Addis Abeba
- List of saints from Africa
