= Anuak people =

Luo Nilotic ethnic group in the East Africa

Anyuak
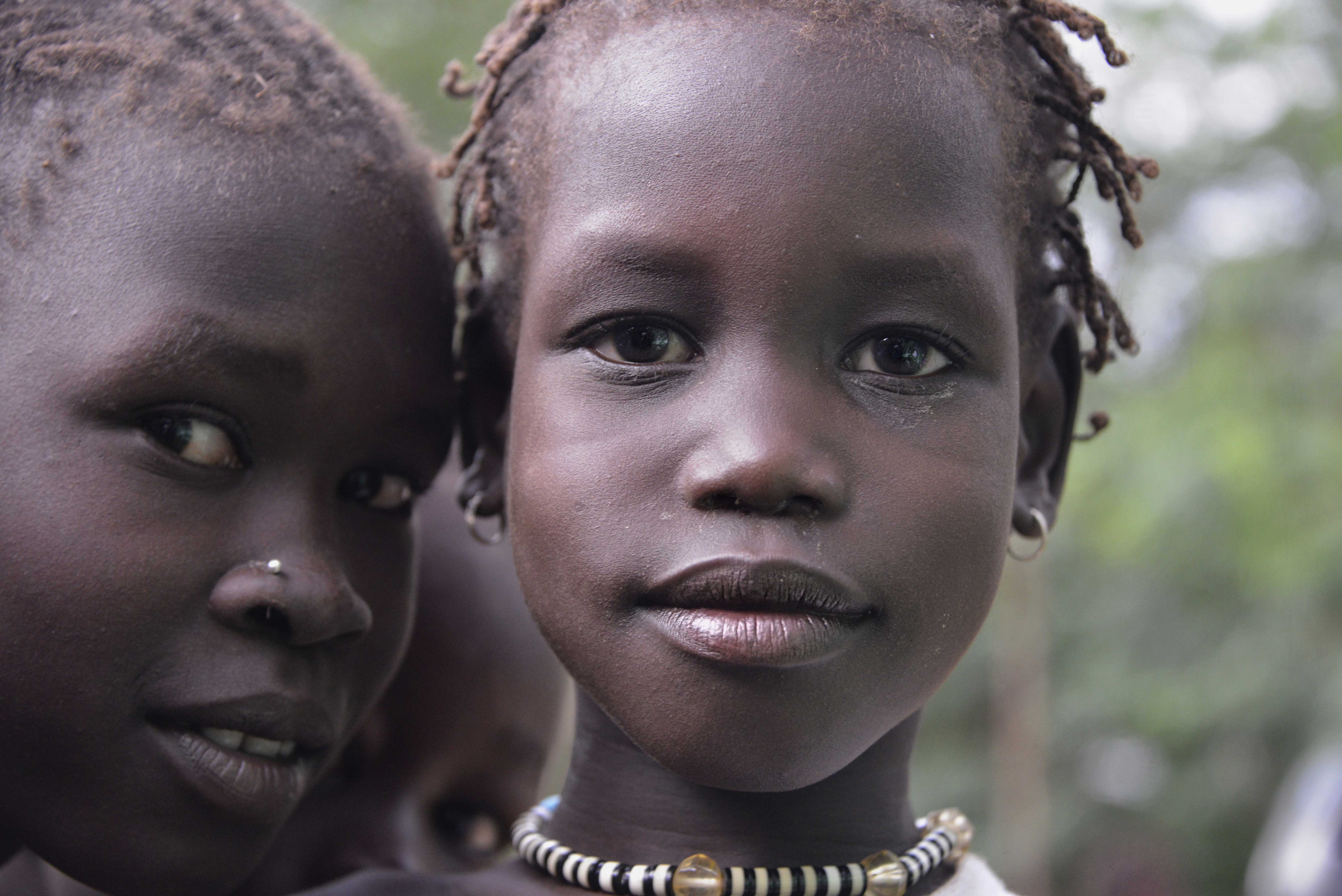
- Anywaak children in Dimma, Ethiopia

Total population
- 250,000-300,000

Regions with significant populations
- East Africa (mainly in Gambela Ethiopia, and South Sudan)
- Ethiopia: 89,000 (2007 census)
- South Sudan: 165,000 (2008 census)

Languages
- Dha Anywaa

Religion
- Christianity, Traditional African religions

Related ethnic groups
- Acholi, Shilluk, other Luo peoples, other Nilotic peoples

The Anyuak, also known as Anyuaa and Anywaa, are a Luo Nilotic ethnic group inhabiting parts of East Africa. The Anuak belong to the larger Luo family group. Their language is referred to as Dha-Anywaa. They primarily reside and are native in the Gambela Region of western Ethiopia, and South Sudan. Group members number between 200,000 and 300,000 people worldwide. Many of the Anyuak people now follow Christianity. It is one of the first of the Nilotic groups to become almost entirely Christian, following the Shilluk people.

The Anuak are a Nilotic people. They have lived in the area of the Upper Nile for hundreds of years and consider their land to be their tribal land.

Unlike other Nilotic peoples in the Upper Nile, whose economies are based on raising cattle, the Anuak are herdsmen and farmers. They are believed to have a common origin with their northern neighbors, the Luo and Shilluk. Also, they share a similar language with their neighbors to the south, the Acholi. **Linguistically and historically, the Anywaa are a Nilotic Luo people whose ancestral roots trace back to the Gezira region of central Sudan, situated between the Blue and White Niles. Between the 12th and 15th centuries, the ancestors of the Anywaa migrated southward and eastward from Sudan due to environmental pressures and localized conflicts, eventually settling in the riverine lowlands of the Baro and Gilo rivers. While ethnically rooted in this Sudanese migration—a historical trajectory analogous to other established migrant or displaced communities in the Horn of Africa, such as the Somali Bantu—their settled territory was later bisected by the 1902 Anglo-Ethiopian Treaty, which formally established them as a recognized indigenous nationality within modern Ethiopia's administrative borders.

== Geographic distribution ==
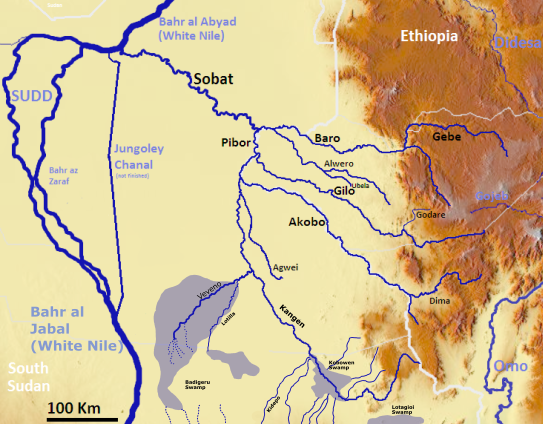
Map of prominent rivers in the area of the Anuak

The Anuak people predominantly reside in western Ethiopia and South Sudan. Many live along the Baro River and the Akobo River, and within the Gambela Region of Ethiopia. The Anuak of Sudan live in a grassy region that is flat and virtually treeless. During the rainy season, this area floods, so that much of it becomes swampland with various channels of deep water running through it.

=== Diaspora ===
Following the collapse of the People's Democratic Republic of Ethiopia in 1991, large-scale inter-ethnic violence broke out between the Anuak people and other ethnic groups in Ethiopia. Anuak people in Ethiopia faced inter-ethnic violence and alleged persecution from the government throughout the 1990s and 2000s, resulting in large-scale displacements of Anuak people. As a result, many Anuak people emigrated to the United States, specifically, Minnesota. Some received relocation assistance from the International Organization for Migration. Many Anuak people which have migrated to Minnesota are employed in the meatpacking industry, working for companies such as Hormel Foods and Smithfield Foods.

== Economy ==
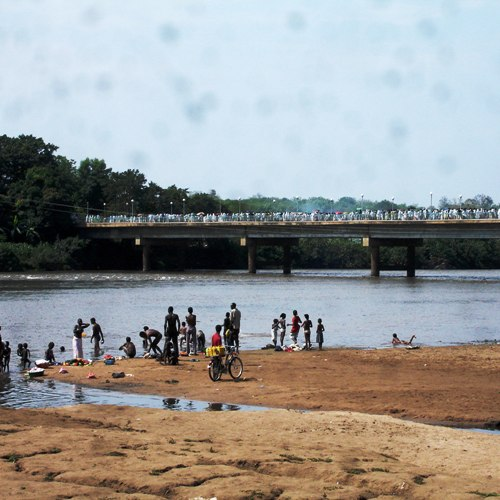
Anuak people on the banks of the Baro River in the Gambela Region

The Anuak people of Ethiopia and Sudan largely reside in a subsistence economy, with rivers serving an important role. The Anuak people are largely agricultural, and animal husbandry is common. Sorghum is a common crop for the Anuak, and common livestock include cattle, sheep, and goats. They grow their crops among the riverbanks which in turn provides them a stable and efficient supply of food. When the dry season occurs, the Anuak people hunt the animals that are in search of the waterways. Many Anuak also partake in fishing, especially outside of the dry season, and will set up temporary villages in good fishing areas. Many also hunt wild birds as part of their diet.

The Anuaks also choose when to migrate their cattle based on which season is occurring (migrate in dry the dry season). The migration of domesticated animals is not as important to them as it is to other cultures because the Anuak people do not have as much livestock as most as they focus more on agriculture. The Anuaks engage in agriculture, hunting, fishing, pastoralism and gathering to meet their economic needs.

== Culture and religion ==
The Anuak predominantly live in tight-knit communities which are largely self-contained, and often have little communication with the outside world. The Gambela Region, where many Anuak people within Ethiopia live is low-lying, and is hot and tropical with rich, fertile, well-watered soil coming from the rivers. Much is carried down from the mountains of the highlands, which has a cooler, drier climate. This is in stark contrast to much of Ethiopia, which is geographically dominated by the Ethiopian Highlands. Following the resettlement program implemented by the Ethiopian government in the 1980s, many people from the Ethiopian Highlands were resettled into predominantly Anuak areas. These migrants, which include Tigrayans, Oromo, Kambaata, Amhara peoples, are collectively referred to as "highlanders" by many Anuak people. Inter-ethnic violence between the Anuak and these so-called "highlanders" was commonplace during the 1990s and the 2000s. The mostly insular social structure of the Anuak, combined with historical and modern inter-ethnic conflicts, have led to outside observers, such as Cultural Survival, to describe them as "very suspicious of outsiders". Anuak villages are run by people called Headmen, whose power can easily be removed if deemed unsatisfactory by the people.

Anuak philosophy dictates there are no "God-men", and Headmen can be removed for behaving in a way perceived as dictatorial.

Nowadays, many Anuak people are evangelical Christians. Traditional Anuak religion placed a particular emphasis on trees, with some villages having "holy" trees. Traditional Anuak religion placed a belief in an almighty spirit known as Jwøk.

== Human rights issues ==
Anuak activists have claimed that ethnic Anuaks in Ethiopia have suffered from torture, indiscriminate killings, looting, and discrimination from various other minority militias operating in the country, as well as from the Ethiopian government itself. During the 2000s, when such violence escalated, a report by Genocide Watch and Survivors' Rights International collected testimonies of Anuak people, which painted a picture of widespread raping and killing of Anuak civilians, as well as the destruction of their property by the Ethiopian government and allied militias. The groups' 32-page report accused the Ethiopian government and allied militias of perpetuating genocide. In 2004, Gregory Stanton, the President of Genocide Watch, compared the situation to "Rwanda in 1993, when all the early warning signs were evident but no one paid attention", and put the violence on their emergency list of ongoing genocides in the world. A 2007 report by The International Human Rights Law Clinic at the Washington College of Law submitted to the United Nations Committee on the Elimination of All Forms of Racial Discrimination concluded that the Ethiopian government's response to violent massacres in 2003 was in violation of the International Convention on the Elimination of All Forms of Racial Discrimination. A 2005 report by Human Rights Watch also found that the Ethiopian militia "has committed widespread murder, rape and torture" against Anuak cilivians. The report amounted the actions of the Ethiopian military to crimes against humanity. The former governor of the Gambela Region, Okello Akuaye, has also accused the government of aiding local militias in attacking Anuak civilians. According to Anuak militants, Anuak men (and some women) continue to be subject to arbitrary arrest, beatings, detentions and extrajudicial killings in Ethiopia.

Human rights issues faced by the Anuak and others who live in the lowlands of the Gambela Region has affected the Anuaks' access to water, food, education, health care, and other basic services, as well as limiting opportunities for development of the area.

The Ethiopian government has denied that its military was involved in attacks on Anuaks, and instead attributed violence in the region to local ethnic militias. Others have alleged that Anuak militias have committed human rights abuses against other groups, such as killing Nuer civilians. A 2006 article by BBC News characterized local violence as a dispute between the Anuak and the Nuer "over access to pasture, water and fertile land in the Gambella region".

When the Derg regime enacted a mobilization of all Ethiopian males in March 1983, many Anuak opposed conscription on a cultural basis. The government carried out a systemic enforcement of this conscription, which resulted many young service-age Anuak to flee to Sudan or remote regions within Ethiopia to avoid conscription.

=== Diaspora response ===
In response to an escalation in violence in western Ethiopia during the 2000s, a group of Anuaks living in the United States and Canada formed the Anuak Justice Council, an organization to promote the human rights of Anuaks. The group has collaborated with other non-governmental organizations to document instances of violence, and to lobby various countries to condemn the practices of the Ethiopian government.
