= Foro subregion =

Coordinates: 15.2488°N 39.6303°E

Foro
- Subregion
- Interactive map of Foro
- Country: Eritrea
- Region: Northern Red Sea
- Capital: Foro
- Time zone: UTC+3 (GMT +3)

Foro subregion is a subregion in the Northern Red Sea region (Zoba Foro) of Eritrea. Its capital lies at Foro.

== Overview ==
The town is situated near the coast. A confluence of the Haddas, Aligide and Comaile River's runs through the district. During the 1960s, there was significant agricultural development on the district's alluvial plains.

== Bibliography ==
- Subregions of Eritrea
