= Battle of Ansaba =

1963 battle of the Eritrean War of Independence

- Part of Eritrean War of Independence
- Battle of Ansaba (Eritrea)
Date	Autumn 1963
Location	Jengeren
Result	ELF victory

Belligerents
Eritrean Liberation Front	Ethiopian Empire

Commanders and leaders
Mohammed Idris Haj (DOW)	Unknown

Casualties and losses
Unknown	23 guns captured

The Battle of Ansaba took place in autumn of 1963, and was part of the Eritrean War of Independence. It was fought in Jengeren, North of Keren, In Anseba Region.

In the battle, the Eritrean Liberation Front successfully ambushed an enemy convoy heading from Keren to Halhal. In the battle, the ELF captured 23 guns, including a Bren light machine gun, as well as ammunitions. The ambush was led by Mohammed Idris Haj, who died of wounds he had received in the confrontation.
