= Eritrean Highlands =

Mountainous region in central Eritrea

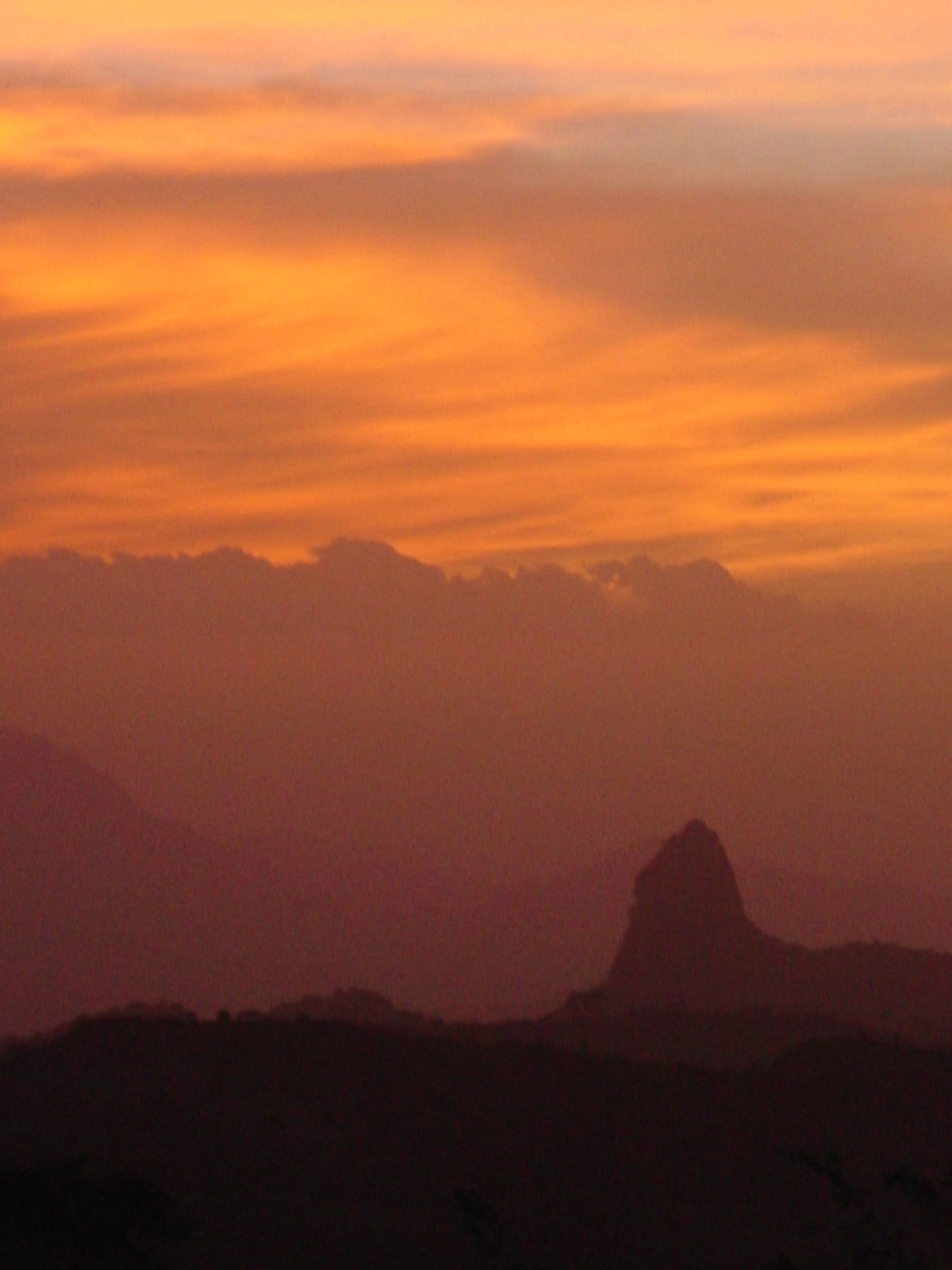
Sunset on the road between Keren and Agordat in the highland Anseba Region of Eritrea

The Eritrean Highlands are a mountainous region in central Eritrea. Bordered to the south by the Mareb River. It is a northern continuation of the Ethiopian Highlands mainly inhabited by Tigrinya speaking people. The region has seen tremendous deforestation since the colonial period, which began in the late 19th century. The Highlands are at particular risk of deforestation and associated soil erosion. Furthermore, the region, lying south of the Sahel are at particular risk of desertification and frequent drought. The Highlands experience, as most tropical regions, two seasons; the rainy season (kremti) is from June–September while the dry season (haggai) is from September to June. The average temperature for Asmara, which is 2,340 m (7,677 ft) above sea level, is approximately 16 °C (61 °F), but other places range from about 10 to 25 °C (50 to 77 °F).

== Geography ==
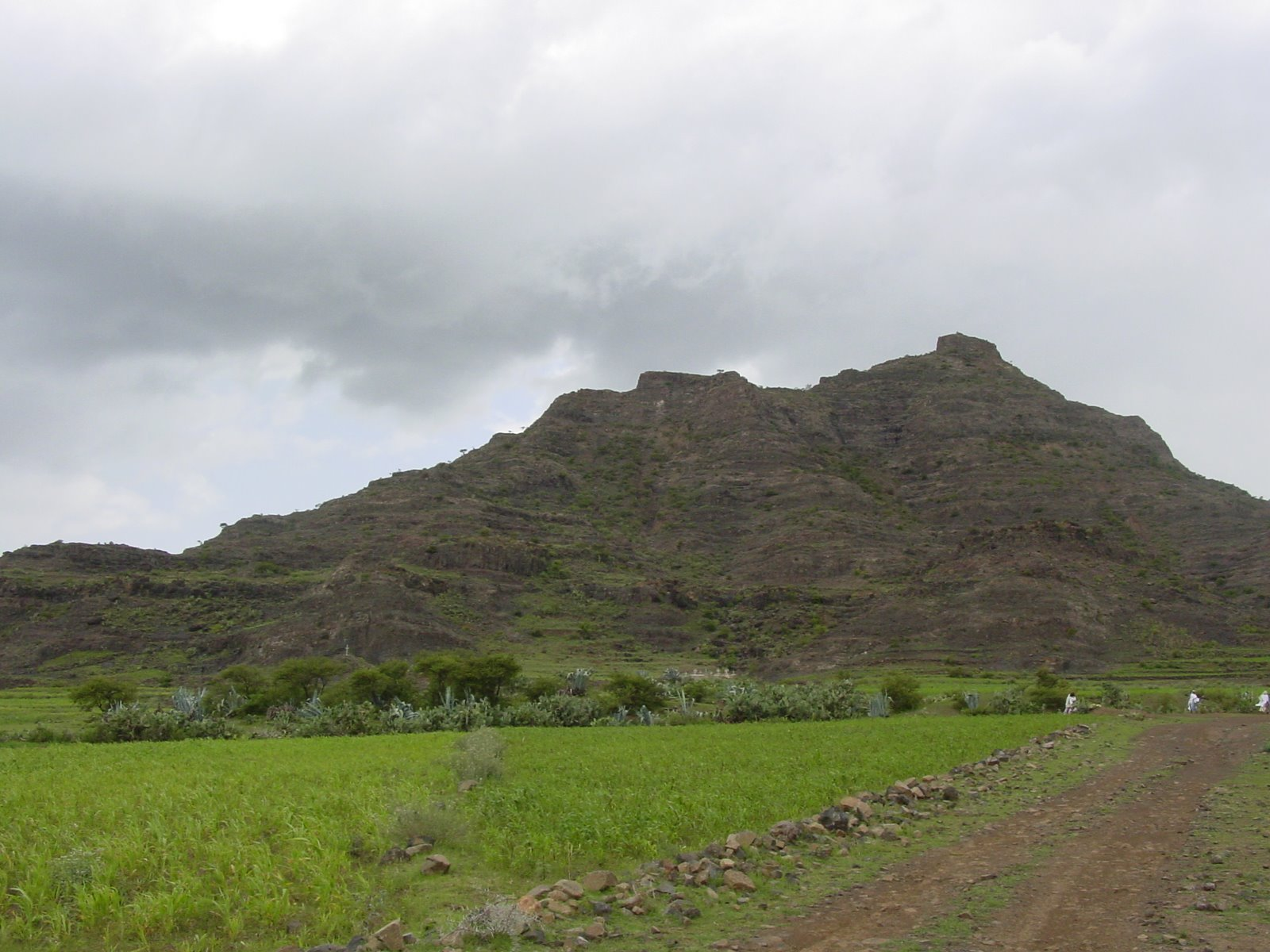
Teff field at the base of a small hill in the Eritrean Highlands.

The Eritrean Highlands are drained by four major rivers towards Sudan, and by several smaller rivers into the Red Sea coast of Eritrea. Flowing towards Sudan and the Nile are the Gash and Setit rivers, while towards Sudan without reaching the Nile are the Barka and Anseba rivers. The eastern escarpment of Eritrea is drained by numerous small streams.

The highest point in Eritrea is located in the Eritrean Highlands at Emba Soira, 3,018 m (9,902 ft) above sea level.

Many believe that forest cover in the Eritrean Highlands was as high as 30% but has since declined to 1%; however, others including Louise Latt have suggested that there has never been such a dramatic decline in forest cover.

The eastern edge of the Highlands falls off dramatically towards the Red Sea which causes two climatic systems to overlap. This region is oft noted for its perennial forest cover. This is also the region that Eritrea's Merara coffee is grown.

The soil conditions in the Eritrean Highlands is also quite complex. The predominant soils are chromic, eutric, and calsic cambisols of strong red colour. Other soils found in the highlands are lithosols, xerosols and fluvisols.

== See also ==
- Environmental issues in Eritrea
- Geography of Eritrea
