= List of rivers of Eritrea =

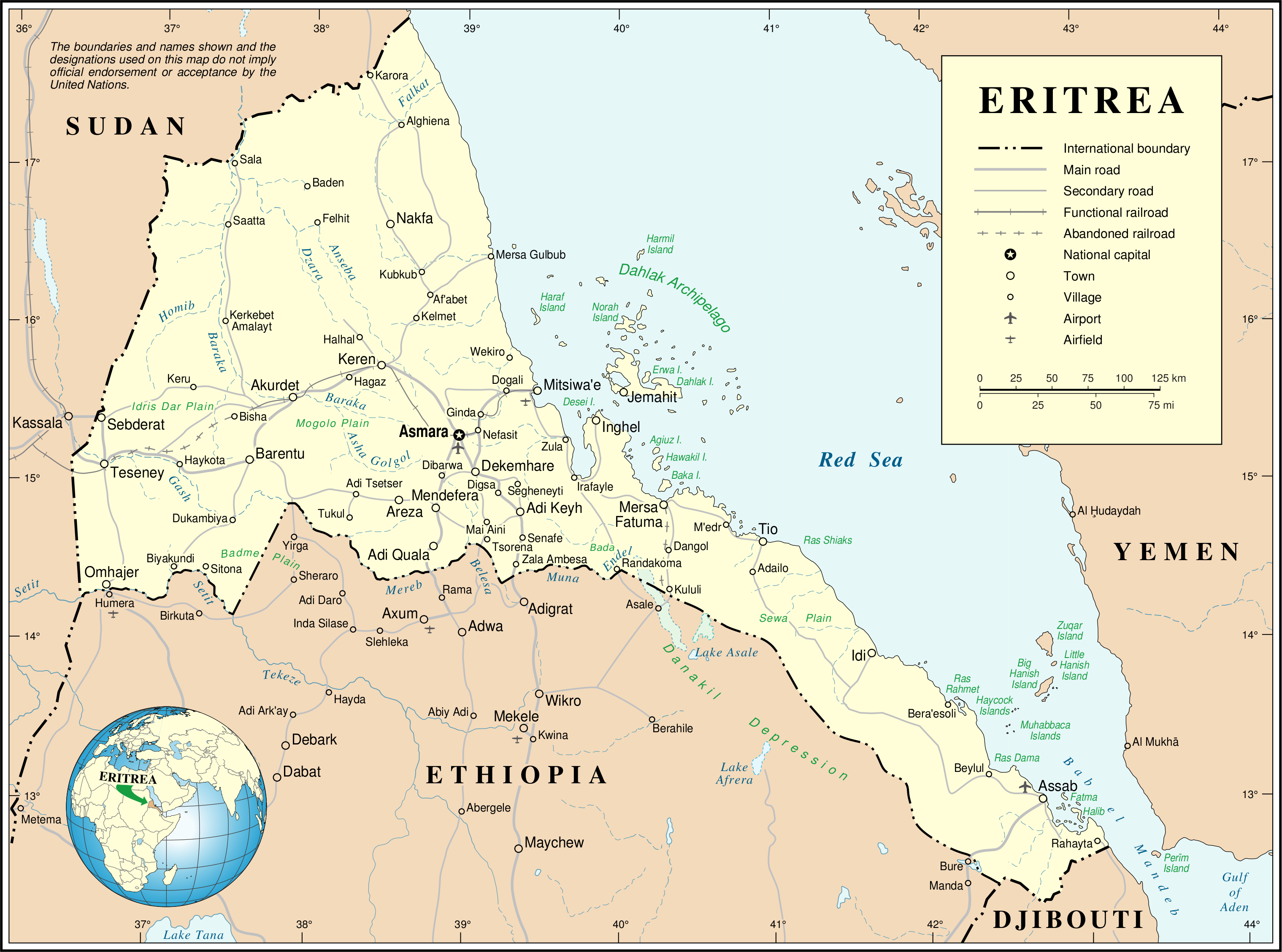
Map of Eritrea showing the main rivers.

This is a list of streams and rivers in Eritrea, arranged geographically by drainage basin. This is a list of rivers in Eritrea, organized by drainage basin. Generally, rivers in Eritrea drain into 3 different basins: those that drain into Sudan, towards the Red Sea and towards the Afar Depression. There is an alphabetic list at the end of this article.

== Flowing into the Mediterranean ==
- Nile (Egypt, Sudan)
  - Atbarah River (Sudan)
    - Mareb River (or Gash River) (only reaches the Atbarah in times of flood)
      - Obel River
    - Tekezé River

== Rivers Flowing into the Red Sea ==
- Barka River
  - Anseba River
    - Zara River
    - Koka River
    - Fah River
  - Mogoraib River
  - Langeb River
- Damas River
- Gonfale River
- Wokiro River
  - Wadi Laba River
- Haddas River
  - Aligide River
    - Barosio River
    - Guwa River
  - Comaile River
  - Saato River

== Alphabetic list ==
- Aligide River - Anseba River
- Barka River - Barosio River
- Comaile River
- Damas River
- Fah River - Falkat River
- Gonfale River - Guwa River
- Haddas River
- Koka River
- Lebka River - Lalake River - Langeb River
- Mareb River - Mogoraib River
- Obel River
- Regali River
- Saato River
- Tekezé River
- Wadi Laba River - Wokiro River
- Zara River

== See also ==
- List of rivers of Africa
