= Damas River =

Baker River may refer to one of the following rivers:

- Damas River (Chile), a river traversing the city Osorno in southern Chile

- Pichi Damas River, a river in Osorno Province in southern Chile

- Damas River (Eritrea), one of the principal watercourses of Eritrea
