= Damas =

Damas may refer to:

== Geography ==
- Damas-aux-Bois, a village in northeastern France
- Damas-et-Bettegney, a village in northeastern France
- Damas, Egypt, a village in Dakahlia Governorate, Egypt
- Damas River (Chile), a river in southern Chile
- Damas River (Eritrea), a seasonal river of Eritrea
- Pichi Damas River, a river of Chile
- Isla Damas, an island of Costa Rica
- Damascus, the capital city of Syria

== Surname ==
- Arturo Rivera y Damas (1923–1994), fifth Archbishop of San Salvador
- Claude Damas Ozimo (born 1939), Gabonese politician
- François-Étienne de Damas (1764–1828), French general
- Georges Aleka Damas (1902–1982), composer of "La Concorde", the national anthem of Gabon
- Germán Carrera Damas (born 1930), a Venezuelan historian
- Ivo Damas (born 1977), Portuguese football player
- Joseph-François-Louis-Charles de Damas (1758–1829), French general
- Juan Velasco Damas (born 1977), Spanish footballer
- Léon Damas (1912–1978), French poet and politician
- Miguel Gómez Damas (1785–1849), Spanish general during the First Carlist War
- Vítor Damas (1947–2003), Portuguese goalkeeper
- Carlos Damas (1973), Portuguese violinist

== Family ==
- House of Damas, one of France's oldest noble families since the 9th century

== Other ==
- Damas (skipper), a genus of skippers in the family Hesperiidae.
- Daewoo Damas, a small van made by Daewoo

== See also ==
- Damas de Blanco ("Ladies in White"), a Cuban human rights organization
- Damas y Caballeros!, a live album by Los Straitjackets
- Damas Towers, former name of the Angsana Hotel & Suites complex
