= Adi Ali Bakit, Anseba =

Ad Ali Bakhit عد علي بخيت
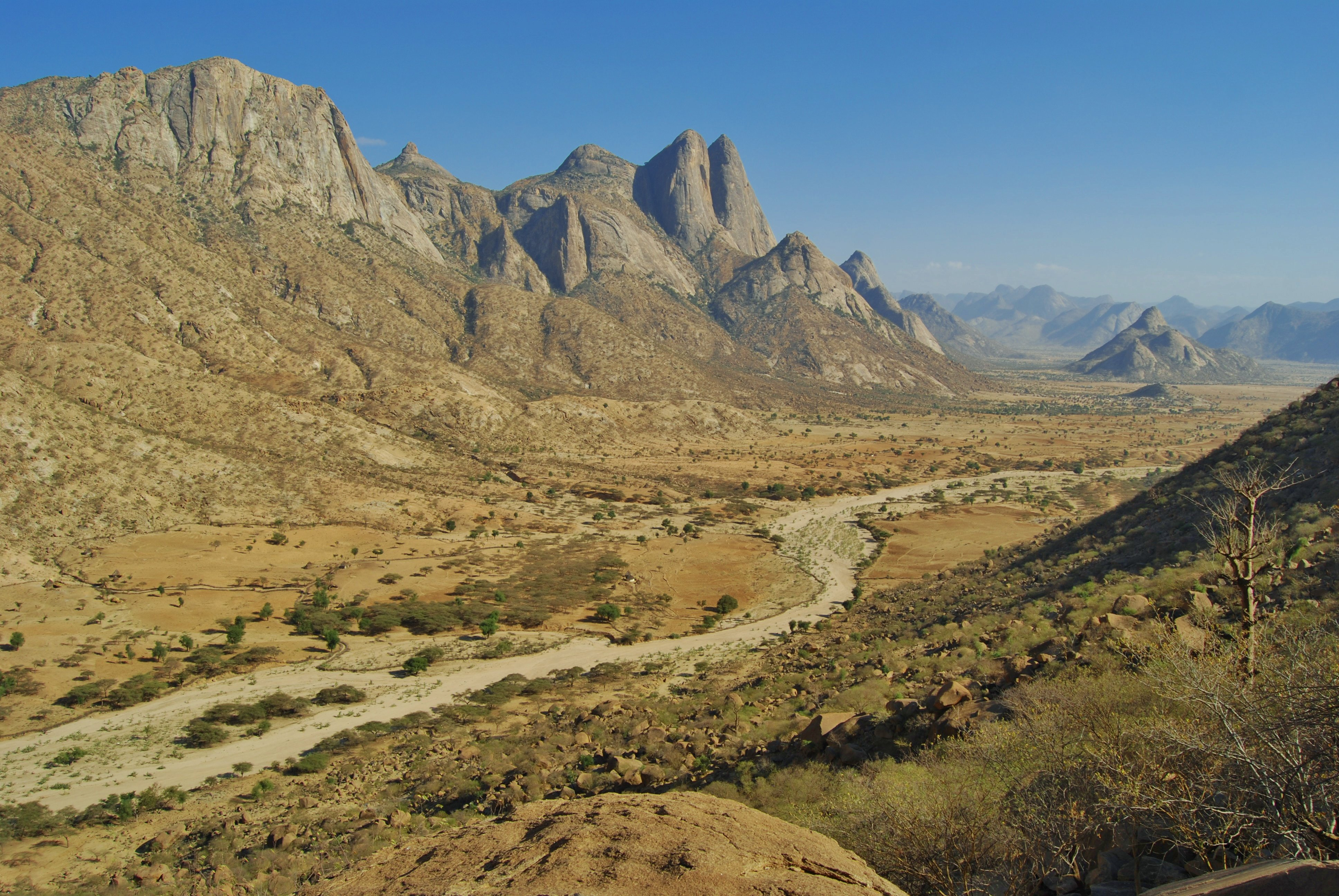
- Landscape around Ad Ali Bakhit village

- Location in Eritrea
- Coordinates: 15°37′N 38°22′E
- Country: Eritrea
- Region: Anseba
- District: Hagaz District

Ad Ali Bakhit (Arabic: عد علي بخيت) is a village in central Eritrea located approximately 25 km south-west of Keren, the second largest city in the country. It is located in Hagaz District in the Anseba region.
