= FAHS =

Fahs or FAHS may refer to:

== People ==
- Sophia Lyon Fahs (1876–1978), American editor, author, teacher, and religious activist
- Edgar Fahs Smith (1854 – 1928), American scientist

== Places ==
- Air Force Base Hoedspruit, an airbase of the South African Air Force
- El Fahs, in Tunisia
- Fahs-Anjra, a prefecture in Morocco

== Schools ==
- Fairview Alternative High School, Roseville, Minnesota, United States
- Fleetwood Area High School, Fleetwood, Pennsylvania, United States
- Frankfurt American High School, Frankfurt, Germany
- Franklin Academy High School, part of Franklin Academy, Wake Forest, North Carolina
- Feilding High School, Feilding, New Zealand

== See also ==
- FAH (disambiguation)
