= Adi Ali Bakit =

Adi Ali Bakit may refer to two villages in Eritrea:

- Adi Ali Bakit, Anseba in Hagaz District of Anseba
- Adi Ali Bakit, Gash-Barka in Dghe District of Gash-Barka
