= Obel River =

River in Eritrea

Obel River Ubel River
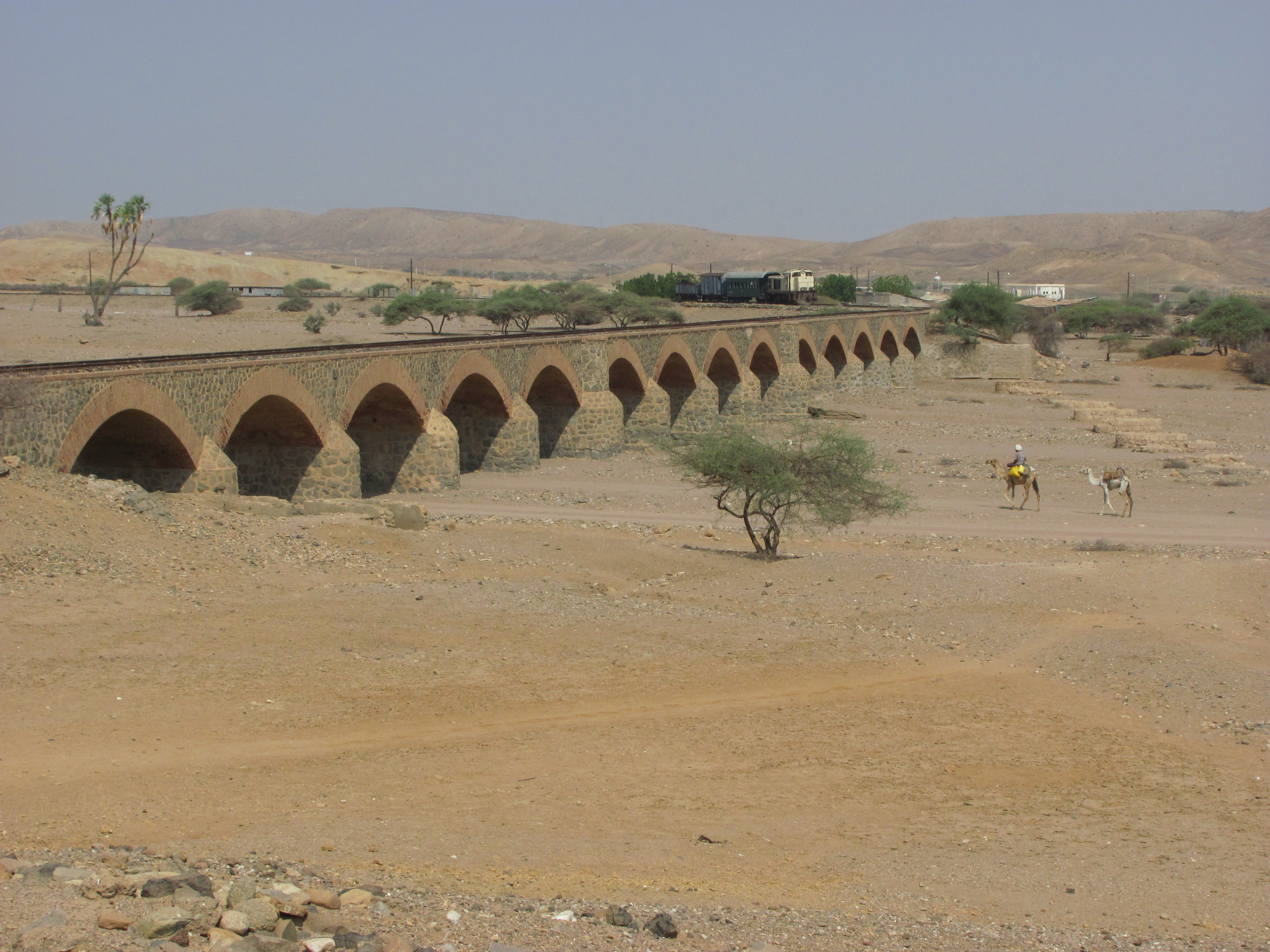
- Viaduct over the Obel River

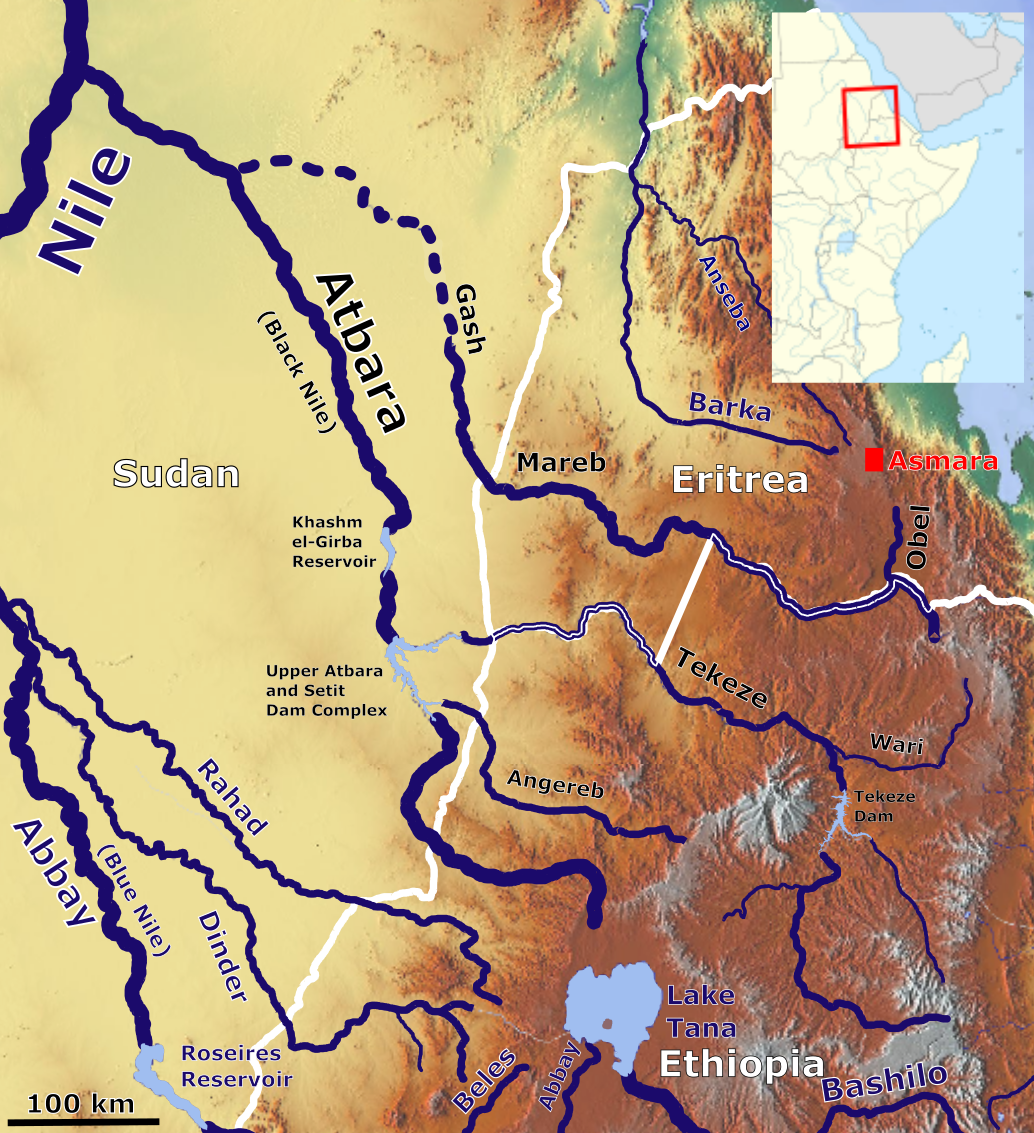
- Map of the Atbarah River Basin

Physical characteristics
- Mouth: Mereb River
  - coordinates: 14°40′13″N 38°15′57″E
  - elevation: 1,038 m (3,406 ft)
- Basin size: 2,750 km^{2} (1,060 sq mi)

Basin features
- Progression: Mareb → Atbarah → Nile → Mediterranean Sea

The Obel River (or Ubel River) is a right tributary of the Mareb (Gash) river. The latter watercourse forms part of the border between Eritrea and Ethiopia, with its headwaters in the Eritrean Highlands.

According to Ministry of Information of Eritrea, there are big farms around Obel River's banks where fruits and vegetables are grown.

== See also ==
- List of rivers of Eritrea
