= Damasias =

Damasias (Δαμασίας) may refer to:

- Damasias of Amphipolis, Olympic winner in 320 BC
- Damasias, son of Penthilus (son of Orestes)
- Damasias, Archon of Athens 639–638 BC and 582–581 BC

== See also ==
- Damas (disambiguation)
