= Kerkebet =

Kerkebet كركبت
- Town
- Location in Eritrea
- Coordinates: 16°18′N 37°24′E
- Country: Eritrea
- Region: Anseba
- Subregion: Kerkebet
- Time zone: UTC+3 (EAT)

Kerkebet (Arabic: كركبت,Tigrinya: ከርከበት), alternatively Carcabat, is a town in Eritrea. It is located in the Anseba region and is the capital of the Kerkebet subregion.

Wildlife such as the Grévy's zebra, Spotted hyena, ostrich, and a variety of antelopes are found here.
