= Sela, Eritrea =

Sela سلع
- Town
- Location in Eritrea.
- Coordinates: 16°53′N 37°36′E
- Country: Eritrea
- Region: Anseba
- Subregion: Sela
- Time zone: UTC+3 (EAT)

Sela (Sel'a, Arabic: سلع) is a town in the north-western Anseba region of Eritrea. It is the capital of the Sela subregion.
