= Wadi Laba River =

River in Eritrea

Location
- Country: Eritrea

Physical characteristics
- Source
  - coordinates: 15°43′1″N 38°49′1″E
- Mouth
  - coordinates: 15°47′52.1″N 39°3′50.8″E

The Wadi Laba River is a seasonal spate river in Eritrea that typically produces turbulent flow events of only a few hours duration, and only five to ten times during the short summer season. It empties north of Massawa into the Red Sea. Prior to its end, the river merges with the Wokiro River.

== See also ==
- List of rivers of Eritrea
