= Wokiro River =

River in Eritrea

Physical characteristics
- Mouth
  - location: Red Sea
  - coordinates: 15°53′40.2″N 39°19′4.9″E

The Wokiro River is a seasonal watercourse in Eritrea. It ends north of Massawa, at the Red Sea. Prior to its terminus, the Wokiro merges with the Wadi Laba River.

== See also ==
- List of rivers of Eritrea
