= Hagaz =

Hagaz حقاز ሓጋዝ
- Town
- Location in Eritrea
- Coordinates: 15°42′8″N 38°16′34″E
- Country: Eritrea
- Region: Anseba
- District: Hagaz
- Time zone: UTC+3 (EAT)

Hagaz (Hagaz, Tigre: ሓጋዝ Arabic: حقاز) is a town in central Eritrea. Located in the Anseba region, it is the capital of Hagaz District. The Hagaz Agricultural and Technical School is situated here.
