= Foro =

Foro فورو
- Town
- Location in Eritrea
- Coordinates: 15°15′33″N 39°37′16″E
- Country: Eritrea
- Region: Northern Red Sea
- District: Foro

Foro (Arabic: فورو, Tigrinya: ፎሮ) is a town in the Northern Red Sea region (Zoba Semienawi Keyih Bahri) of Eritrea.

== Overview ==
A small city located near the coast, Foro was built at the confluence of the Haddas, Aligide and Comaile rivers. In the 1960s, there was significant agricultural development on its alluvial plains.

The Aksumite ruins of Adulis are situated about 6 kilometres (3.7 mi) to the east.

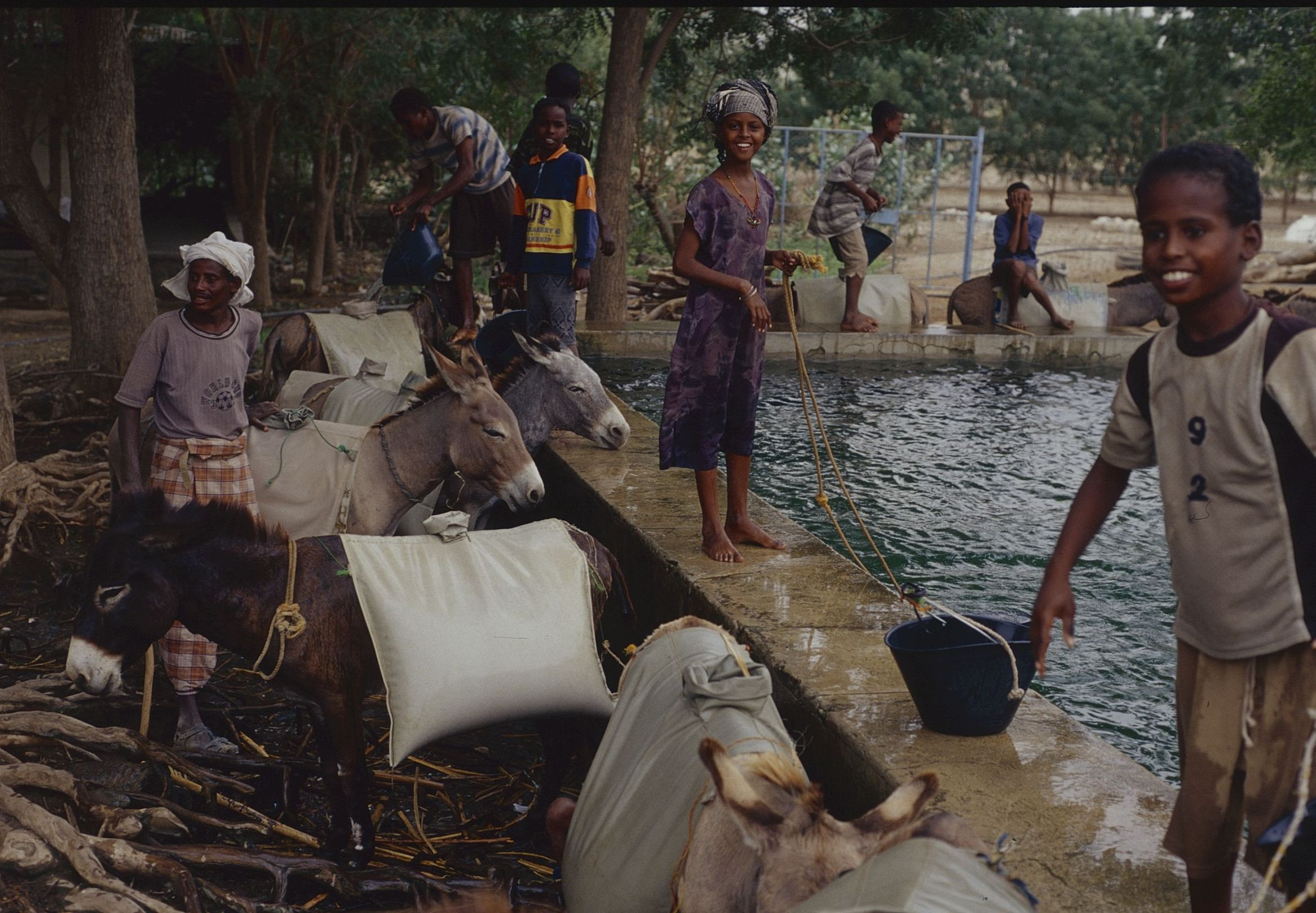
Foro Water Reservoir
