= Sela subregion =

Coordinates: 16°52′48″N 37°26′24″E

Sela
- Subregion
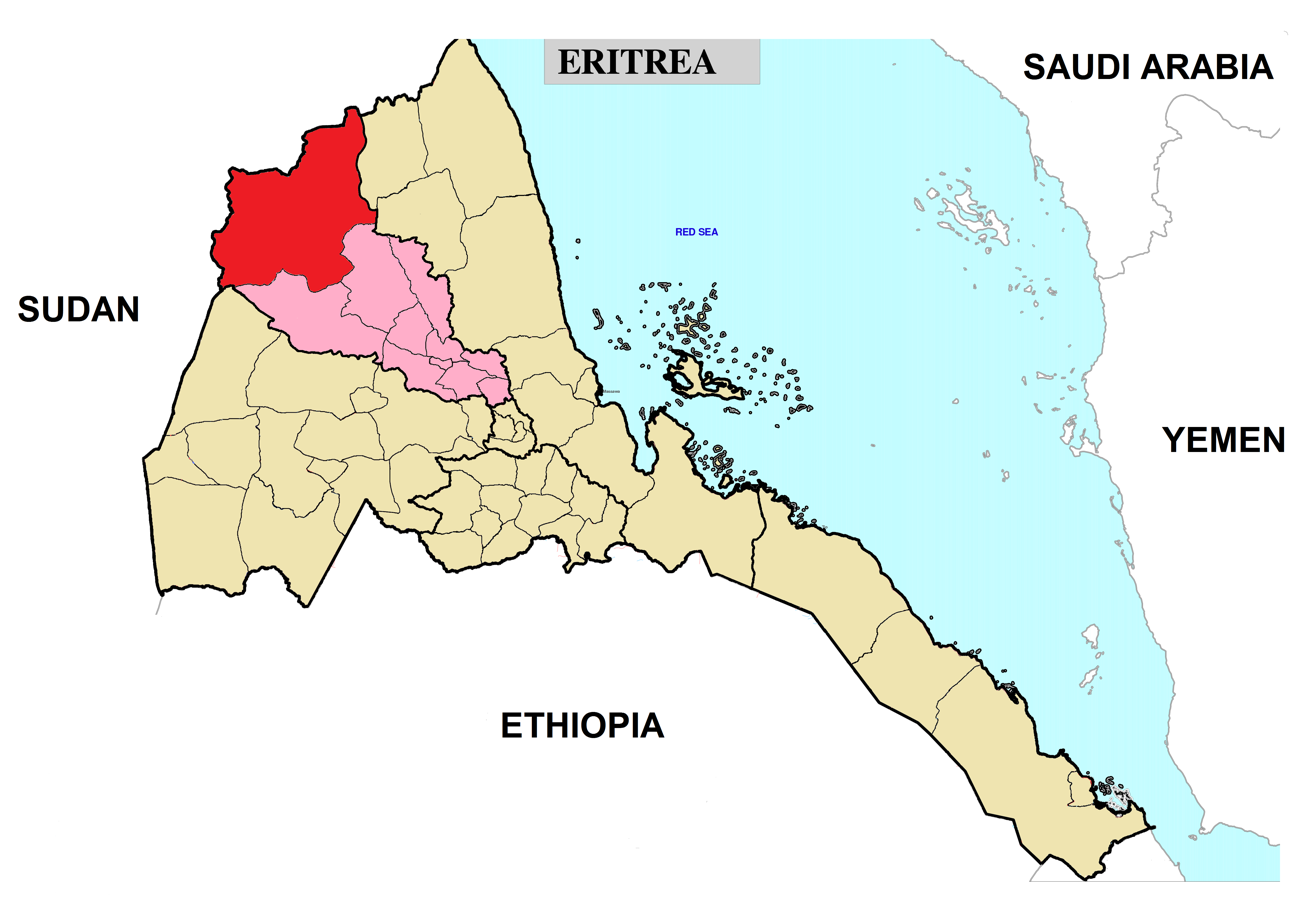
- Country: Eritrea
- Region: Anseba
- Capital: Sela
- Time zone: UTC+3 (GMT +3)

Sela subregion is a subregion in the northwestern Anseba region (Zoba Anseba) of Eritrea. Its capital lies at Sela.
