= Halhal subregion =

Coordinates: 15.993°N 38.229°E

Halhal
- Subregion
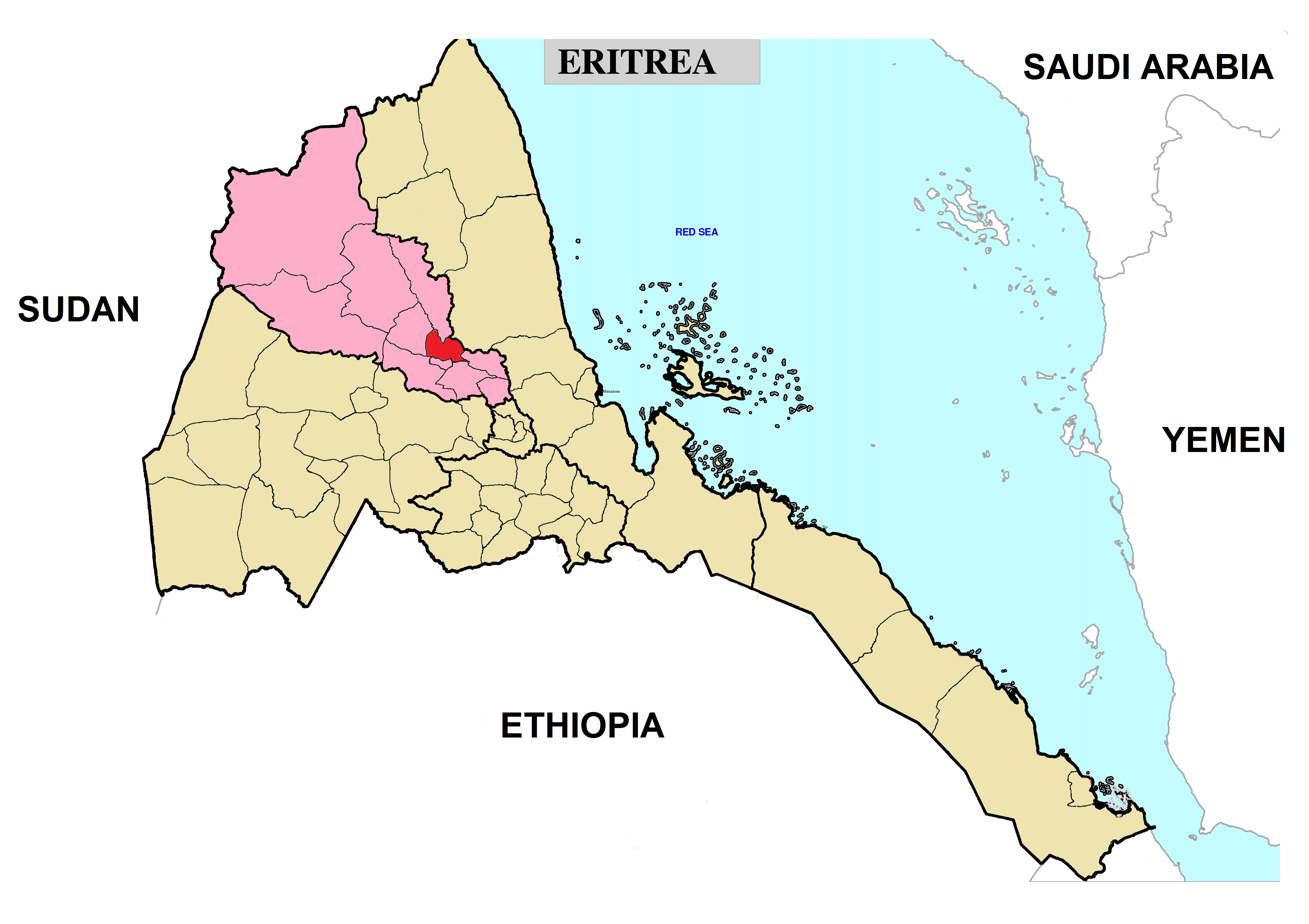
- Country: Eritrea
- Region: Anseba
- Capital: Halhal
- Time zone: UTC+3 (GMT +3)

Halhal subregion is a subregion in the northwestern Anseba region (Zoba Anseba) of Eritrea. Situated 12 km north of Keren (Cheren), its capital lies at Halhal.

== Towns and villages ==
- Bashari
- Bet Homeir
- Gam
- Karotsahar
- Kemeil
- Kerbobared
- Kosh
- Makalaci Awatil
- Mashalit
- Soter
- Wazintat
- Zamado
- Metkelabe
- Mai Awalid
