= FAH =

FAH, Fah or Fäh may refer to:

- Fah River, in Eritrea
- Baissa Fali language, spoken in Nigeria
- Faafu Atoll Hospital, in Maldives
- Federation of American Hospitals
- First Affiliated Hospital of Xinjiang Medical University, in China
- Folding@home
- Foreign Affairs Handbook, part of the Foreign Affairs Manual published by the U.S. Department of State
- Fumarylacetoacetate hydrolase

== Aeronautics ==
- ASL Airlines Hungary, a Hungarian airline
- Farah Airport, in Afghanistan
- Honduran Air Force (Spanish: Fuerza Aérea Hondureña)

== People ==
- Linda Fäh (born 1987), Swiss model and a pageant titleholder
- Claudio Fäh (born 1975), Swiss motion picture director
- Simon Faeh (born 1982), Swiss sprint canoer
- Foil Arms and Hog, comedy trio from the Republic of Ireland
