= Asmat =

Asmat may mean:

- Asmat people, ethnic group in New Guinea
- Asmat languages, of New Guinea
- Asmat Regency, Indonesia
- Asmat subregion, in northwestern Eritrea
