= Mereb River =

River flowing out of central Eritrea

Mereb River Gash or al-Qash
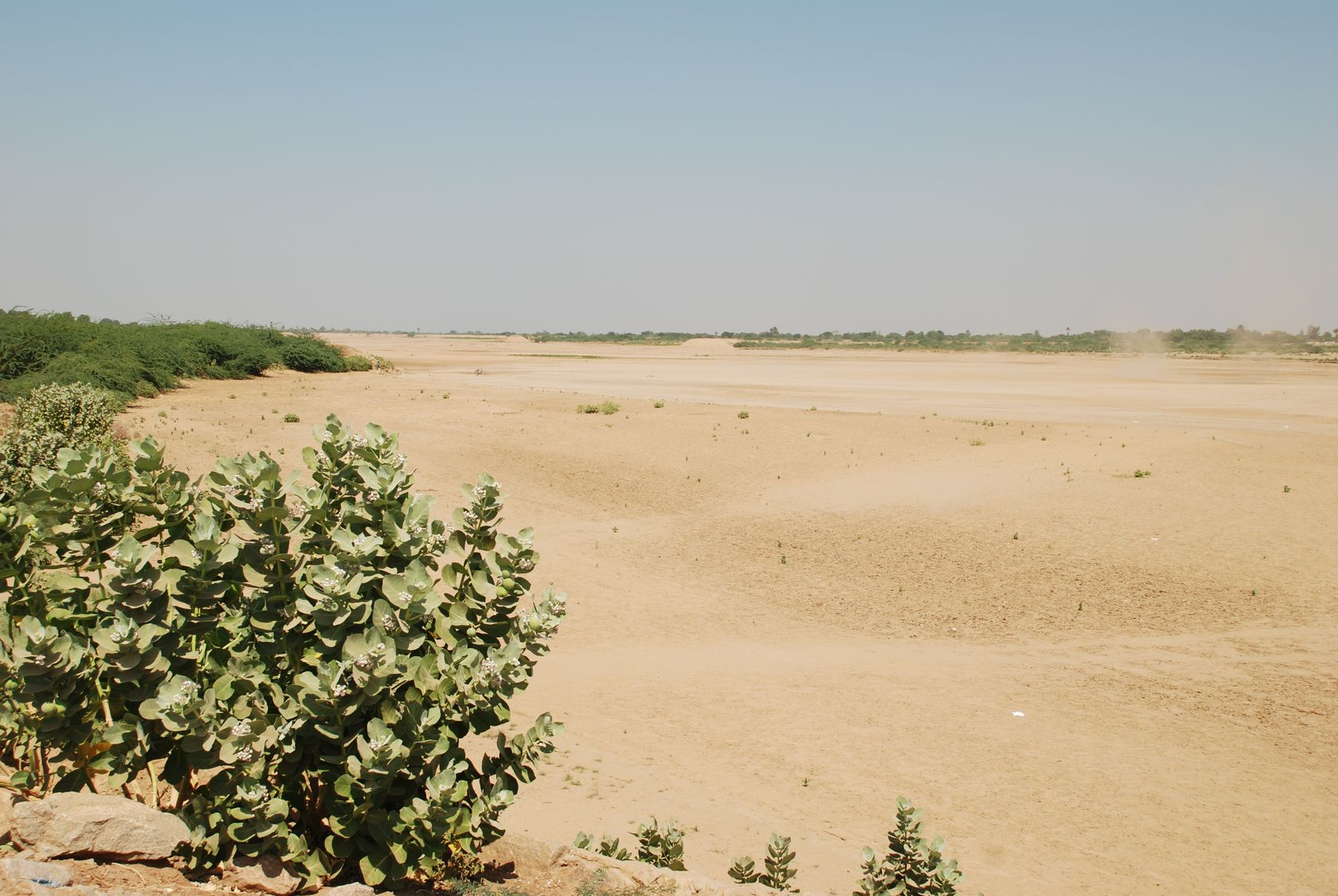
- The Mereb's dry riverbed at Kassala

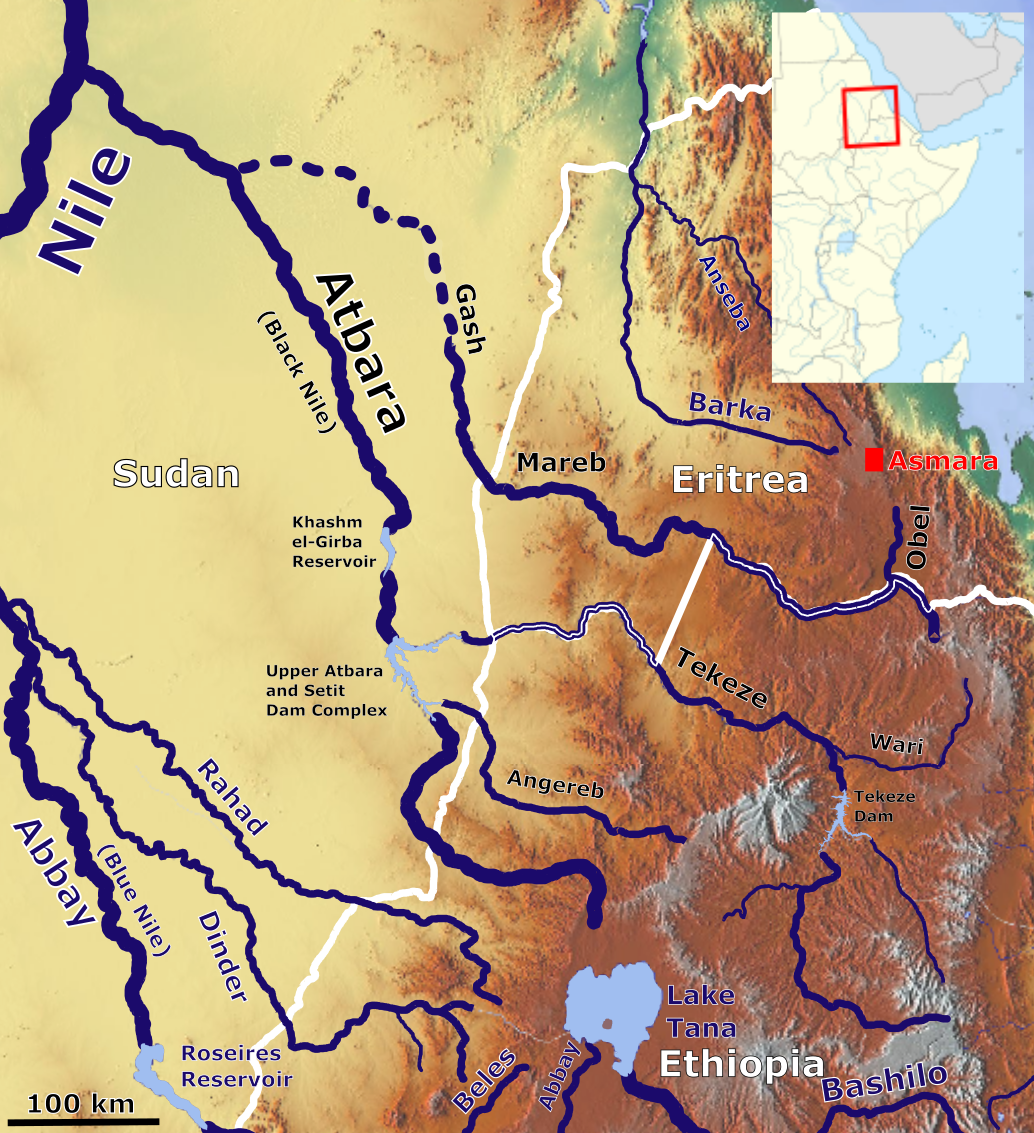
- The Mereb River in the Atbara basin

Location
- Countries: Eritrea; Ethiopia; Sudan

Physical characteristics
- Source
  - location: 15 kilometres (9.3 mi) south-west Asmara
- Mouth
  - location: Dissipates in the sands of the eastern Sudanese plains
- Length: 440 km (270 mi)
- Basin size: 31,000 km^{2} (12,000 sq mi)
- Discharge
  - average: 21.6 m^{3}/s (760 cu ft/s)

Basin features
- Tributaries
  - left: Sarana River, Balasa River, 'Engweya River, Gala River
  - right: Obel River

The Mereb River (Italian: fiume Mareb), also known as the Gash River (Arabic: القاش), is a river flowing out of central Eritrea. Its chief importance is defining part of the boundary between Eritrea and Ethiopia, between the point where the Mai Ambassa enters the river at 14°53.6′N 37°54.8′E to the confluence of the Balasa with the Mereb at 14°38′N 39°1.3′E.

== Course ==
According to the Statistical Abstract of Ethiopia for 1967/68, the Mereb River is 440 kilometres (270 mi) long. The Ethiopian Ministry of Water Resources reports its Ethiopian catchment area as 5,700 square kilometres (2,200 sq mi), with an annual runoff of 0.26 billion cubic meters. Other sources talking about a catchment of 21,000 square kilometres (8,100 sq mi) to 44,000 square kilometres (17,000 sq mi) over all, and a discharge of 21.6 cubic metres per second (760 cu ft/s) in average over the year, and 870 cubic metres per second (31,000 cu ft/s) in peaks. Its headwaters rise south-west of Asmara in central Eritrea. It flows south, bordering Ethiopia, then west through western Eritrea to reach the Sudanese plains near Kassala. Unlike the Setit or Takazze rivers, which flow out of Ethiopia and also forms a natural border with Eritrea, the waters of the Mereb do not usually reach the Nile but dissipate in the sands of the eastern Sudanese plains, forming an inland delta.

The Mereb is dry for much of the year, but like the Takazze is subject to sudden floods during the rainy season; only the left bank of the upper course of the Mereb is in Ethiopian territory. Its main tributaries are the Obel River on the right bank (in Eritrea) and the Sarana, Balasa, Mai Shawesh, and 'Engweya Rivers on the left (in Ethiopia).

== History ==
The Mereb was important historically as the boundary between two separately governed regions in the area: the land of the Bahr negash (Tigrinya "kingdom of the sea", also known as Medri Bahri or "land of/by the sea") to the north of the river, and the Tigray to the south. The territories under the Bahr negash extended as far north as the Red Sea coast, and as far south (and west) as Shire and the capital was at Debarwa in modern Eritrea, about 20 miles (30 km) south of Asmara.

== Wildlife ==
The river's Eritrean floodplain was the location of a 2001 sighting of a sizable elephant herd, the first such sighting in Eritrea since 1955.

== See also ==
- List of rivers of Eritrea
- List of rivers of Ethiopia
- List of rivers of Sudan
