= Kerkebet subregion =

Coordinates: 16°06′N 37°25′E

Kerkebet
- Subregion
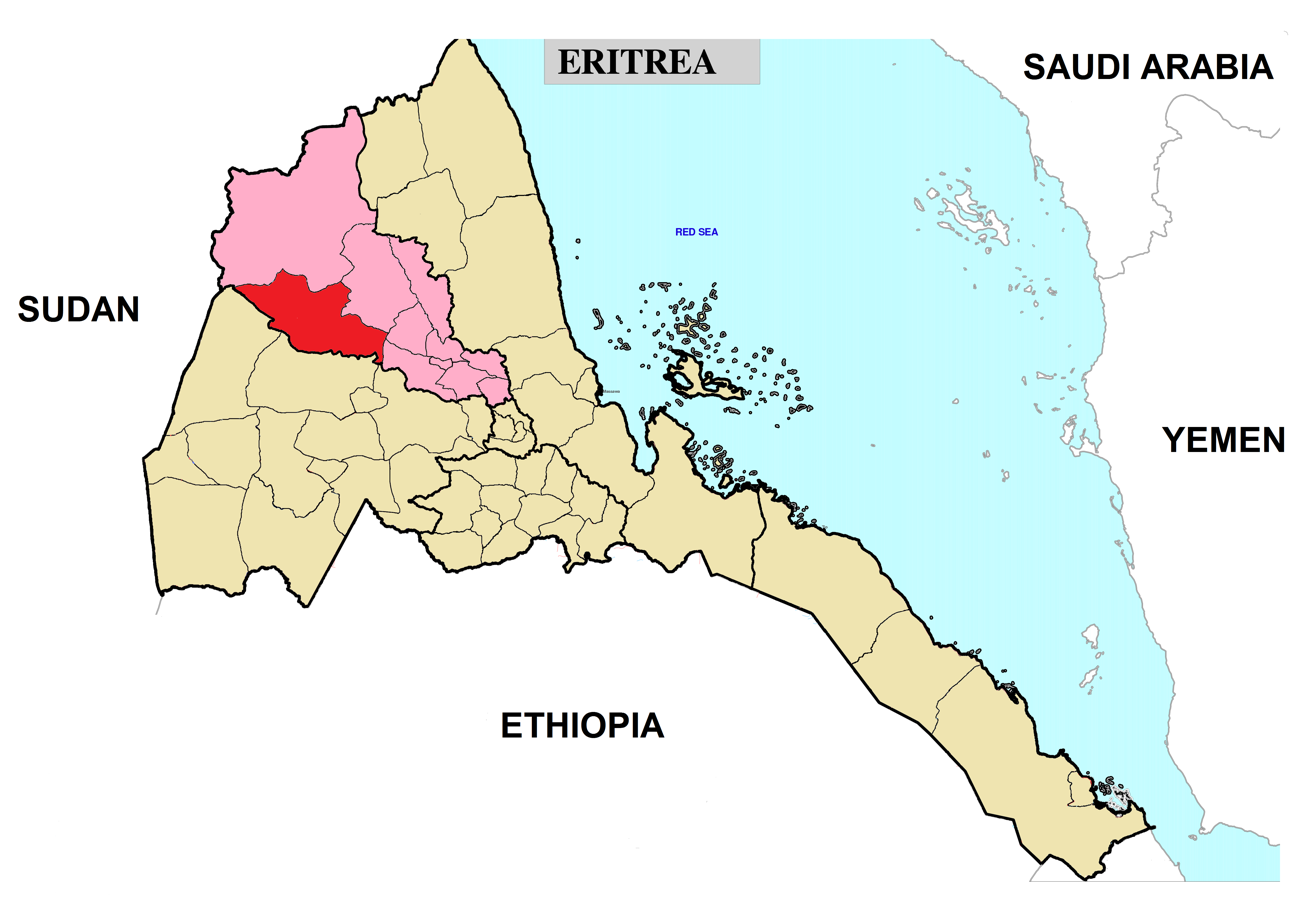
- Country: Eritrea
- Region: Anseba
- Capital: Kerkebet
- Time zone: UTC+3 (GMT +3)

Kerkebet subregion (Tigrinya: ንኡስ ዞባ ከርከበት) or Carcabat district is a subregion in the northwestern Anseba region (Zoba Anseba) of Eritrea. Its capital lies at Kerkebet (Carcabat).
