= Fah River =

River in Eritrea

Coordinates: 16°59′28″N 38°11′10″E

Location
- Country: Eritrea

Physical characteristics
- Mouth: Anseba River

Basin features
- Progression: Anseba River → Barka River → Red Sea
- River system: Barka River Basin

The Fah River is a river in Eritrea that flows into Anseba River, part of the Barka River basin. It runs beside the settlement of Fah, which was a major base for the Eritrean People's Liberation Front during the Eritrean War of Independence.
