= Halhal, Eritrea =

Halhal حلحل
- Town
- Location in Eritrea
- Coordinates: 15°56′21″N 38°16′55″E
- Country: Eritrea
- Region: Anseba
- Subregion: Halhal
- Time zone: UTC+3 (EAT)

Halhal (Arabic: حلحل), also spelled Hal-Hal, is a town in the Anseba region (Zoba Anseba) of Eritrea. It is the capital of the Halhal subregion, and is sometimes known as Fisho (from Italian officiale) to distinguish it from the subregion as a whole. It is chiefly populated by the Bet tawqe subtribe of the bilen people .

The town and surrounding area saw intense fighting during the Eritrean War of Independence. In 1968, the Ethiopian Army commando post there was attacked by Omer Ezaz of the Eritrean Liberation Front (ELF); Ezaz and about 70 of his soldiers were killed. The town was later taken by the ELF, and was controlled by the ELF from 1970 to 1981, when as a result of the Second Eritrean Civil War, control passed to the Eritrean People's Liberation Front. From 1983 to Eritrean independence in 1991, the town was controlled by the Ethiopian Army, except for a brief period of EPLF control in the spring of 1988 following the Battle of Afabet.

== Works cited ==
- Statoids.com, retrieved December 9, 2010
- Dan Connell; Tom Killion (2000). Historical Dictionary of Eritrea (2nd ed.). ISBN 0810875055.
