= Aligide River =

River in Eritrea

Aligide River Alighede River

Location
- Country: Eritrea

Physical characteristics
- Source
  - coordinates: 15°9′56.308″N 39°10′26.803″E
- Mouth: Red Sea
  - coordinates: 15°14′25″N 39°43′6″E

The Aligide River is a watercourse in Eritrea. It has its source a short distance outside of the national capital, Asmara. The river flows down the Eastern Escarpment of Eritrea until the small town of Foro near the Red Sea coast. At this point, the Aligide merges with two other rivers, the Comaile River and the Haddas River. The combined river continues from there until it empties into the Red Sea in a delta on the Gulf of Zula.

In its upper reaches, the Aligide has carved steep valleys, but in its lower reaches, it flows through wider valleys and eventually the smoother coastal plain on its way to the sea.

== See also ==
- List of rivers of Eritrea
