= Keren, Eritrea =

Capital of Anseba Region, Eritrea

Keren كرن (Arabic) ከረን (Tigre)
- City
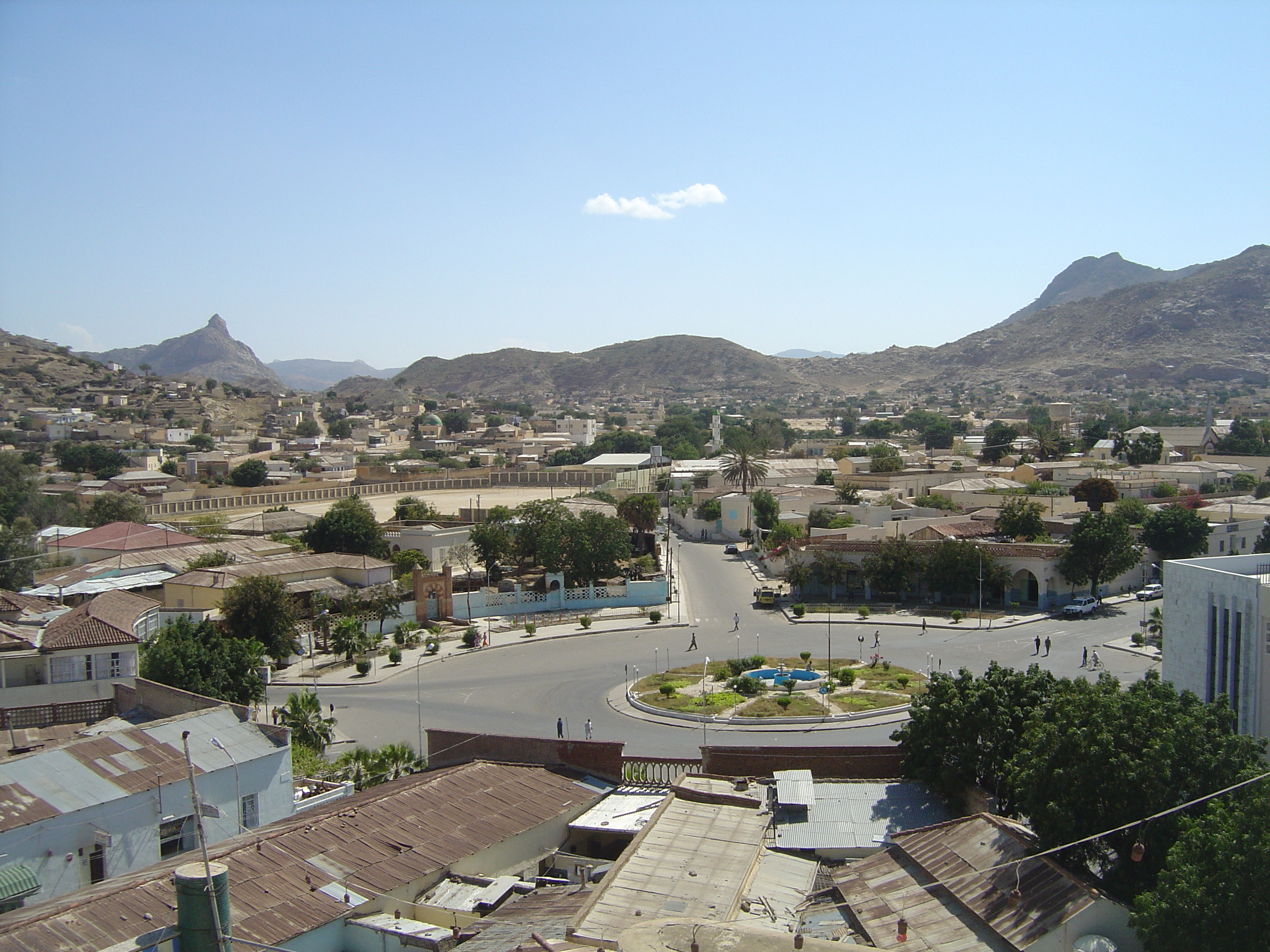

- Location in Eritrea
- Coordinates: 15°46′40″N 38°27′29″E
- Country: Eritrea
- Region: Anseba
- District: Keren
- Elevation: 1,590 m (5,220 ft)

Population (2016)
  - City: 120,000
  - Metro: 146,483

Keren (Tigrinya and Tigre: ከረን, Arabic: كرن, Italian: Cheren), historically known as Sanhit, is the second-largest city in Eritrea. It is situated around 91 kilometres (57 mi) northwest of Asmara at an elevation of 1,590 metres (5,220 ft) above sea-level. The city sprawls on a wide basin surrounded by granitic mountains on all sides. It serves as the capital of the Anseba Region, and is home to a number of ethnic groups including the Bilen people and Tigre people.

== History ==
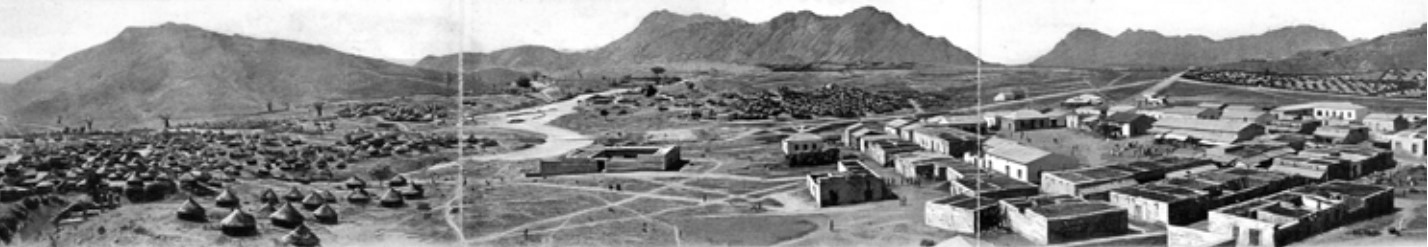
Panoramic view of Italian colonial Keren, showing the indigenous settlement on the left and the European one to the right.

=== 19th century ===
Keren was originally a trading settlement on the Ethiopian frontier, laying on an arid highland plain between the Ansaba and Barka rivers. The settlement owned its importance to its position on the trade route between Massawa and Sudan. The market was largely dominated by traders from Arkiko, whose grain was transported for purchase on the camels of the local Hedareb tribe. Goods sold at Keren also included cotton cloth from Sennar and Egypt, as well as ivory, skins, ostrich feathers and maize from Tigre and Amhara. Much of these goods were purchased by traders travelling up from Massawa. In the middle of the 19th century, Keren was estimated to be a settlement of 350 huts and around 2,000 inhabitants.

Two Lazarist missionaries, Giuseppe Sapeto and Giovanni Stella, undertook a missionary tour of the locality in 1851. Four years later Stella built himself a stone house and established an Italian agricultural colony in the area after obtaining a land concession from the local ruler, Dejazmach Haylu of Hamasien. Stella died in 1869 after which the colony soon disintegrated due to the Italian government refusing to give any support. Missionary activity was curtailed by Emperor Yohannes IV in 1871, who arrested the missionaries and had the hands and feet of the converts amputated.

In the following year, Keren and Bogos were taken over by the Egyptian governor Werner Munzinger, who established a fort at a hill called Sanhit. The introduction of Egyptian rule was followed by renewed missionary activity by the Lazarists, who set up a school in 1874 and built a small number of wooden houses and churches in 1875 with financial assistance from the Egyptian government.

During the Egyptian-Ethiopian War, the Egyptians feared that Yohannes would march against Sanhit, and accordingly reinforced its garrison. In October 1876, the Ethiopians burnt down houses and villages only two hours away from the settlement. Egyptian patrols encountered Ethiopian forces a mere hour away from the fort, but the Ethiopians never attacked the fort and later withdrew from the area. In February 1885, Egyptian troops withdrew from Keren and Sanhit, allowing Yohannes to seize the occasion and occupy it. Ethiopian control of Keren was short-lived, for in December 1889 the Italians rushed up from Massawa and took the opportunity to seize the town. Keren thus became a part of Italian Eritrea which was formally proclaimed in 1890.

=== 20th century ===
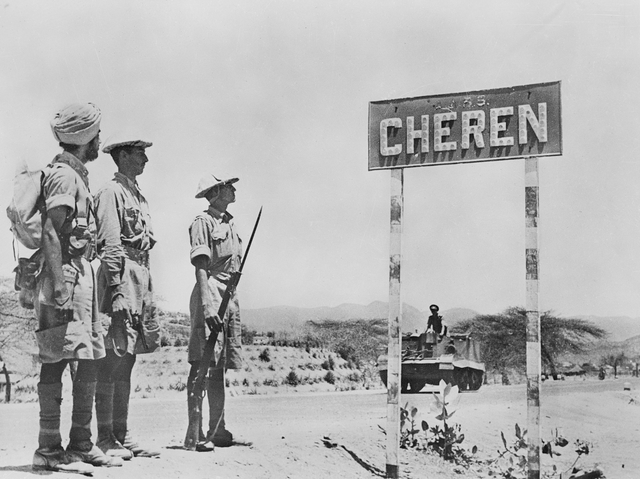
Indian troops stand next to a Cheren (Keren) signpost, May 1941

The coming of Italians from the coastal area was followed by the emigration of thousands of Arabs, Jews, Greeks and Armenians to the region. Majority of those migrants were engaged in trade activities especially the Greeks, and as a result a Greek church was built in Keren. Between 1906 and 1916, the Italians constructed the Administration building, by Feyorcardo Vitorio. This building was built at the times known as to be the town's modernization period. Jacobo Givonti, an Italian businessman constructed the present Commercial Bank in 1916. Cinema Impero and the residential complexes in the area were constructed in the same year, 1916. Later with the rise of fascism in Italy, Caza Del Fache and Caza Del Majori were constructed in 1920 to be the recreation and residential buildings, respectively for the Italian settlers in the town.

In 1911, the railroad was constructed to connect Asmara and Massawa which later continued to reach the town of Keren, and in 1918 a train station was constructed in Keren. In 1920, the train station started to render service to the inhabitants of the area which resulted to the expansion of the agricultural activities by the local inhabitants in the area. The establishment of the railroad and train station also made vital contribution to the town's growth. In 1938, Keren had approximately 9,700 inhabitants. The town had a telegraph office, a cinema, hotels, a Catholic seminary, schools, and administrative buildings. Colonial settlers received large areas around Keren as agricultural concessions for the cultivation of sisal, tobacco, coffee, fruits, and vegetables—such as at Maryam De'arit in Keren and at nearby Elabered.

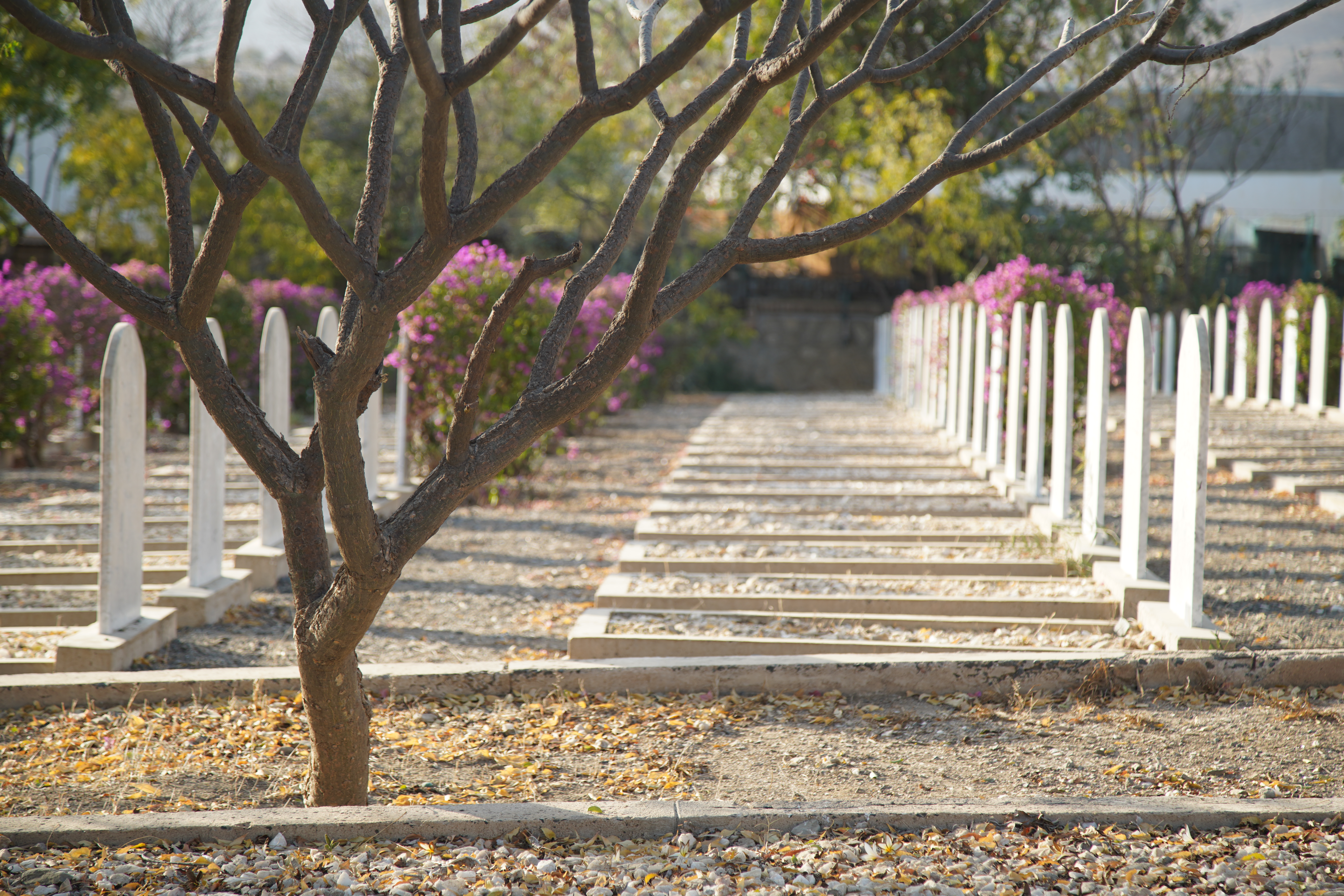
Italian War Cemetery in Keren

During World War II, Keren was the site of a key battle between Italian and British troops in February – March 1941. There is a place called Tenkuluhas which named after the fighting between the Italians and British in the area, and has its name from the Bilen language meaning the place where the soldiers of the gigantic forces wipe out. A cemetery for dead Italians and Eritreans killed at the battle was then established by the British.

During the post-war period and the Ethiopian–Eritrean Federation, Keren became the center of the Muslim League, a major factor in Eritrean politics at the time, was established in December 1946 by Ibrahim Sultan Ali. During the Eritrean War of Independence, Keren was abandoned by the Derg after a five day battle in July 1977 and then became the unofficial capital of the Eritrean People's Liberation Front (EPLF). Following the Derg's major offensive in 1978, Keren was in turn abandoned by the EPLF in November 1978, and a large part of the population fled. It subsequently became a garrison town and, in 1988, the headquarters of the Ethiopian army in the north, remaining so until 1991.

In 1995, Keren became the capital of the new zoba Anseba , comprising most of the highlands surrounding the Anseba River. The main neighbourhoods of the city of Keren are La'li Keren ("Upper Keren"), Gezabanda ("House of the banda"), Shuq ("Market"), Dearit ("Fig tree"), Ad Habab ("Place of the Habab"), Geza-Wereqat ("House of the Paper"), Hilat Geberti ("Quarter of the Jeberti"), Hilat Sudan ("Sudanese Quarter"), and Hilat Tekwarir ("Quarter of the West Africans").

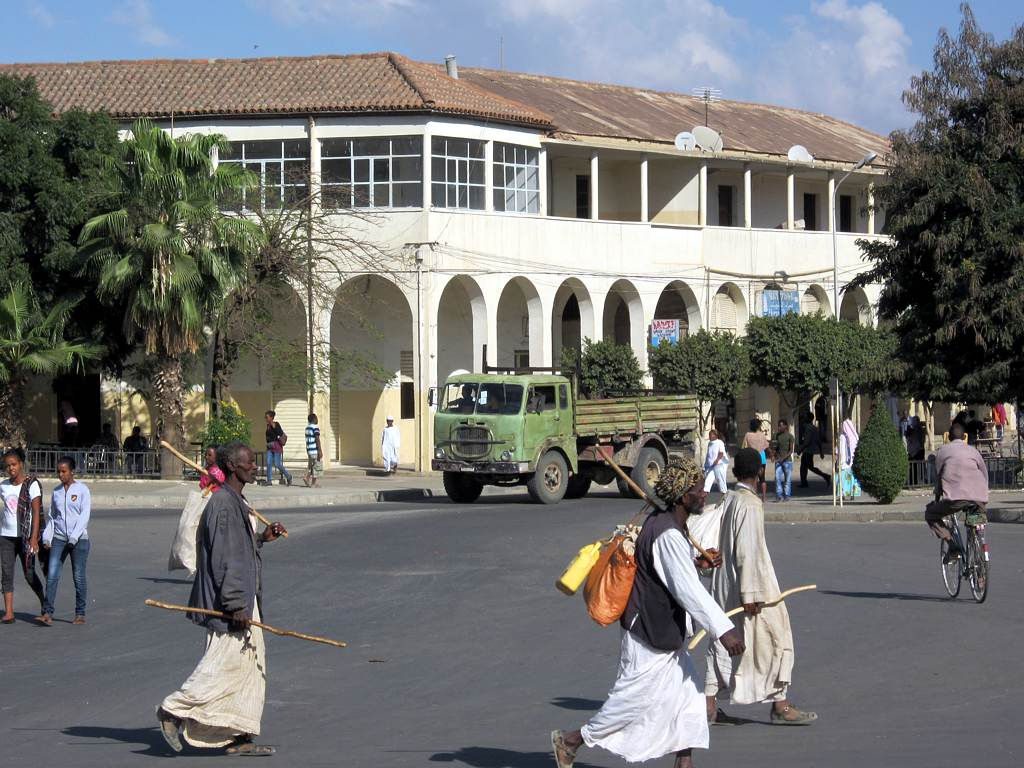
City scenery in Keren

== Demographics ==
As of 2016, Keren has a population of around 120,000 inhabitants. Residents belong to various, mainly Afroasiatic-speaking ethnic groups, of which the Tigrinya people, Bilen people and Tigre people.

== Climate ==
Keren has a hot semi-arid climate (Köppen BSh), with two main seasons. There is a short monsoonal wet season from June to September and a length dry season covering the rest of the year. Compared to most hot semi-arid climates in northern Africa like those of Niamey or N'Djamena, Keren's climate is much less extreme due to the city's higher altitude. Nonetheless, in the period between March and mid-June immediately before the wet season begins, afternoon temperatures still average over 33.1 °C (91.6 °F) for around four months. Following the wet season, temperatures remain very warm to hot during the day, but the mornings become comfortably cool.

Climate data for Keren (1991–2021)
Month	Jan	Feb	Mar	Apr	May	Jun	Jul	Aug	Sep	Oct	Nov	Dec	Year
Mean daily maximum °C (°F)	25.5 (77.9)	27.4 (81.3)	29.2 (84.6)	30.5 (86.9)	31.5 (88.7)	29.8 (85.6)	25.8 (78.4)	24.3 (75.7)	27.1 (80.8)	27.8 (82.0)	26.6 (79.9)	25.4 (77.7)	27.6 (81.6)
Mean daily minimum °C (°F)	13.1 (55.6)	13.6 (56.5)	14.7 (58.5)	16.3 (61.3)	17.5 (63.5)	18.6 (65.5)	17.2 (63.0)	16.9 (62.4)	16.3 (61.3)	14.0 (57.2)	14.1 (57.4)	13.4 (56.1)	15.5 (59.9)
Average rainfall mm (inches)	1 (0.0)	1 (0.0)	6 (0.2)	13 (0.5)	21 (0.8)	44 (1.7)	94 (3.7)	199 (7.8)	123 (4.8)	7 (0.3)	4 (0.2)	1 (0.0)	514 (20)
Average precipitation days	0	0	0	1	4	8	16	21	12	1	1	0	64
Average relative humidity (%)	59	56	50	46	39	44	71	83	64	55	60	62	57
Mean monthly sunshine hours	296.7	346.4	335.4	363.3	376.5	357.9	274.1	219.3	313.3	332.2	316.6	290.3	3,822
Source: Climate-Data

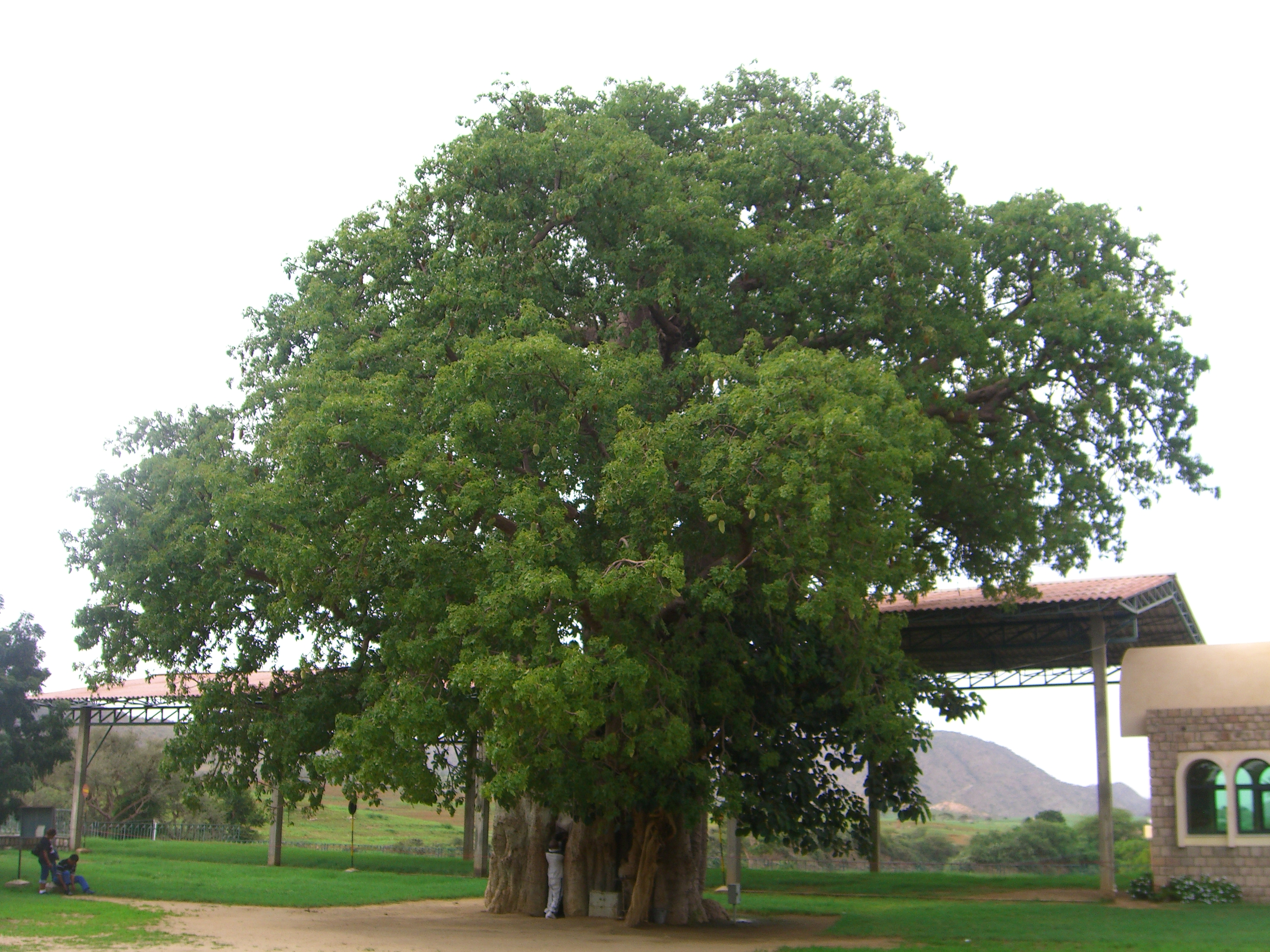
Madonna of the Baobab In 1941 Italian soldiers took refuge in the tree from British planes. The tree was hit but the Italians and the shrine survived. It is a popular tourist attraction.

== Attractions ==
Attractions in the city include the nineteenth century Tigu fort, the St Maryam Deari chapel, lying in a baobab tree, the 1920s former railway station, the old mosque, Sayed Bakri Mausoleum, British Army and Italian Army cemeteries and local markets. The nearby sixth century Debre Sina monastery is also known for its cave dwellings.

== Districts ==
The town's outlying subregions include:

- Elabered
- Geleb subregion
- Hagaz (Hagat)
- Halhal
- Melabso
