= Keren subregion =

Coordinates: 15°47′N 38°27′E

Keren
- Subregion
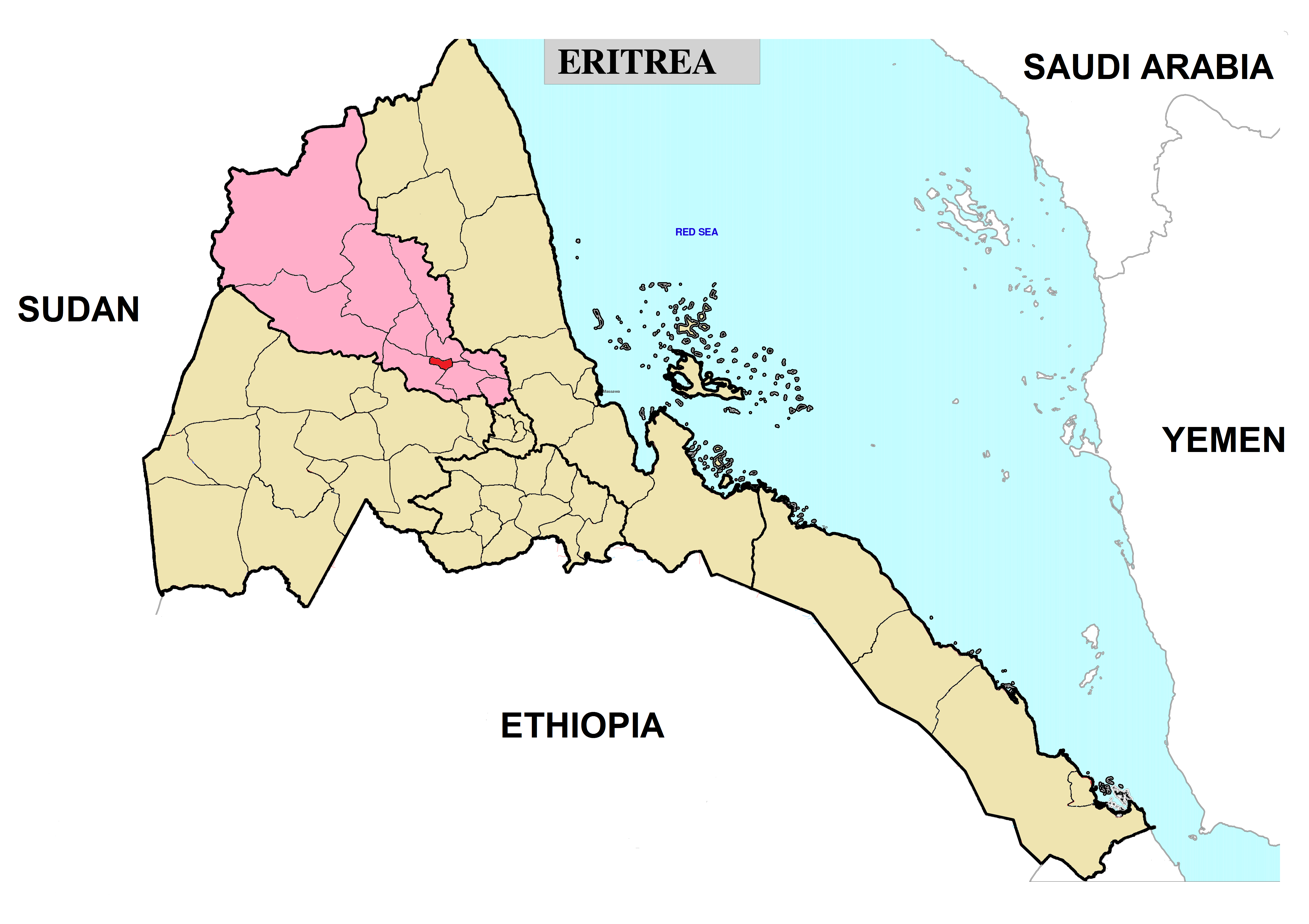
- Country: Eritrea
- Region: Anseba
- Capital: Keren
- Time zone: UTC+3 (GMT +3)

Keren subregion (Cheren subregion) is a subregion in the northwestern Anseba region (Zoba Anseba) of Eritrea. Its capital lies at Keren (Cheren).
