= Haddas River =

Haddas River Hadas River

Location
- Country: Eritrea

Physical characteristics
- Source
  - coordinates: 14°52′57.950″N 39°24′49.208″E
- Mouth: Aligide River
  - coordinates: 15°15′1.541″N 39°35′28.180″E
- Length: 80 km (50 mi)

Basin features
- Progression: Aligide River→Red Sea

The Haddas River (alt. Hadas River) is a seasonal river in Eritrea. Outside of the small town of Foro in the central part of the nation, the watercourse merges with the Comaile and Aligide rivers. The combined river flows south of Massawa, emptying into the Red Sea. Silt carried down in the river has led to the burial of the ancient town of Adulis.

== See also ==
- List of rivers of Eritrea
