= Franklin Academy (North Carolina) =

Public Charter school in North Carolina

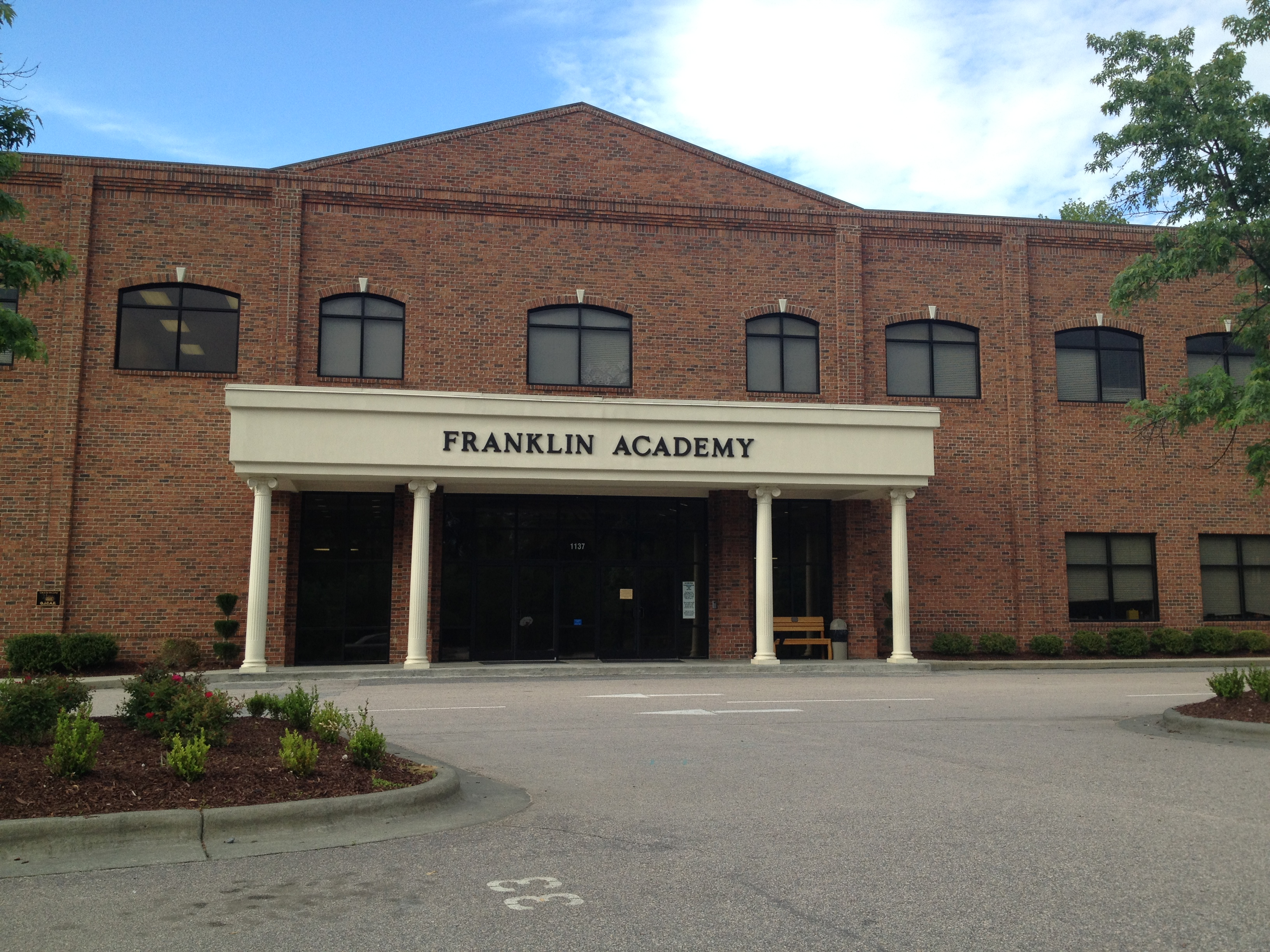

Location
- 648 Flaherty Avenue; Wake Forest, North Carolina 27587; United States; 35°59′09″N 78°29′36″W

Information
- Other name: FA
- Type: Public charter school
- Established: 1998 (28 years ago)
- School district: Franklin Academy
- CEEB code: 344111
- NCES School ID: 370006902415
- Head Administrator: Denise Kent
- Teaching staff: 118.48 (on an FTE basis)
- Grades: K–12
- Enrollment: 1,652 (2023–2024)
- Student to teacher ratio: 13.94
- Colors: K–8: Gold and navy blue 9–12: Red and navy blue
- Mascot: K–8: Falcon; 9–12: Patriot
- Website: franklinacademy.org

Franklin Academy (FA) is a K–12 public charter school in Wake Forest, North Carolina, United States. It was established in 1998.
