= Comaile River =

River in Eritrea

Comaile River Komalie

Location
- Country: Eritrea

Physical characteristics
- Source
  - coordinates: 14°46′13.15″N 39°25′50.84″E
- Mouth: Red Sea
  - coordinates: 15°11′48.844″N 39°42′19.303″E

The Comaile River (also spelled Komalie) has its source between the towns of Adi Keyh and Senafe. It flows down the Eastern Escarpment of Eritrea until the small town of Foro near the Red Sea coast. At this point it merges with two other rivers, the Aligide River and the Haddas River. From this point it continues until it empties into the Red Sea.

== See also ==
- List of rivers of Eritrea
