= Damas, Egypt =

Village in Dakahlia Governorate, Egypt

Damas دماص
- Location in Egypt
- Coordinates: 30.807247°N 31.327329°E
- Country: Egypt
- Governorate: Dakahlia Governorate
- Time zone: UTC+2 (EET)
  - Summer (DST): UTC+3 (EEST)

Damas (Arabic: دماص) is a village in Dakahlia Governorate, Egypt.

== See also ==
- List of cities and towns in Egypt
