= Hagaz subregion =

Coordinates: 15.709233°N 38.268471°E

Hagaz hagat
- Subregion
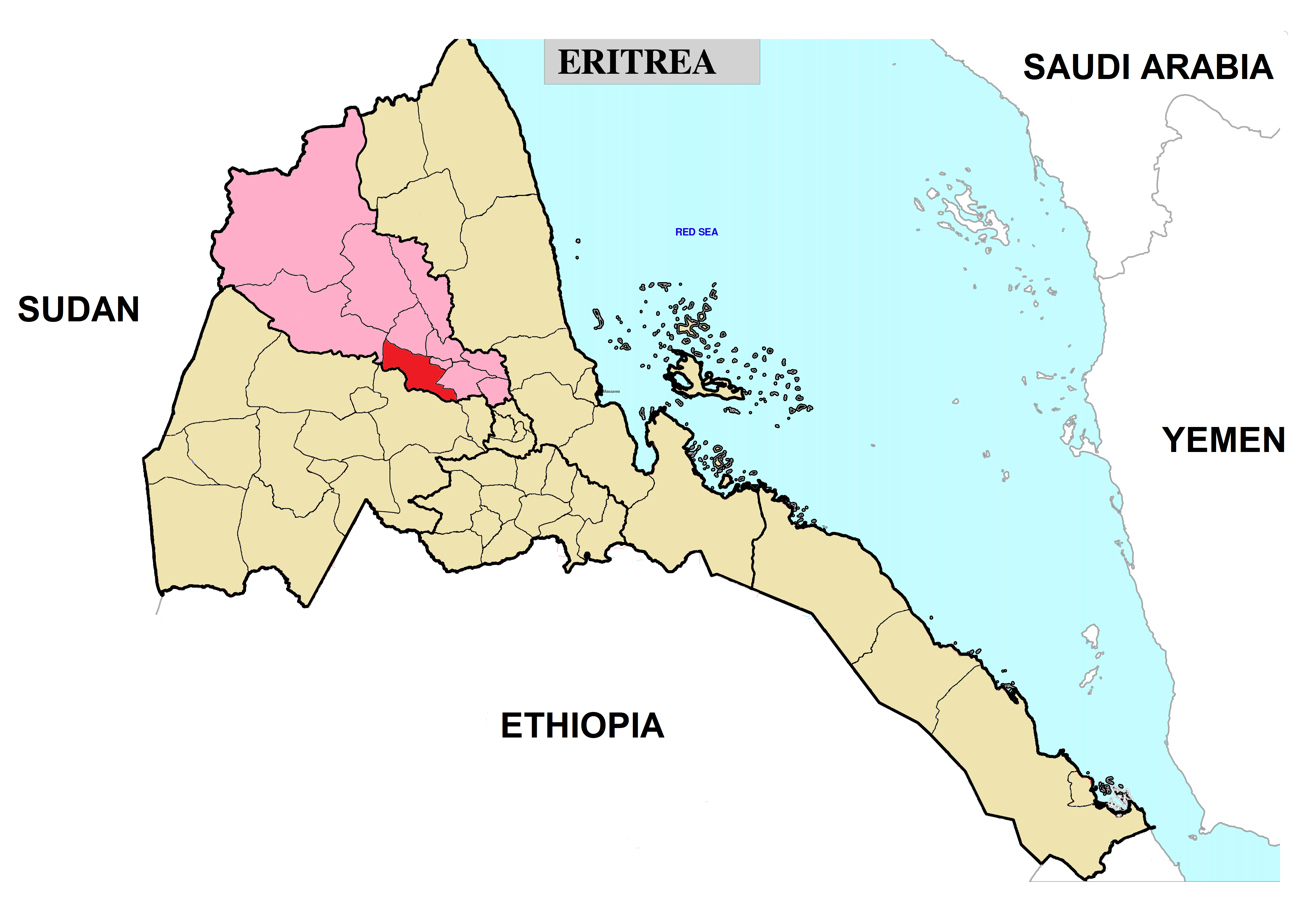
- Country: Eritrea
- Region: Anseba
- Capital: Hagaz
- Time zone: UTC+3 (GMT +3)

Hagaz subregion is a subregion in the northwestern Anseba region (Zoba Anseba) of Eritrea. Its capital lies at Hagaz (Hagat).
