= Barka River =

River in Eritrea

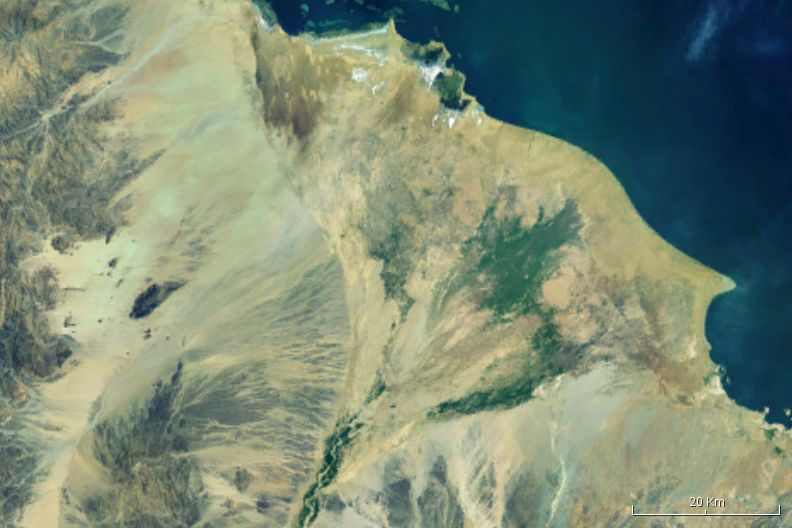
- The Tokar delta with the Barka (bottom)

Location
- Countries: Eritrea; Sudan

Physical characteristics
- Source
  - location: Eritrean Highlands
- Mouth
  - location: Red Sea at the Tokar Delta
  - coordinates: 18.601°N 37.864°E
- Length: 640 km (400 mi)
- Basin size: 66,200 km^{2} (25,600 sq mi)
- Discharge
  - average: 0.8 km^{3}/a (0.19 cu mi/a) (at mouth)

Basin features
- Tributaries
  - right: Anseba Shet'

The Barka River (Arabic: nahr Baraka; Italian: fiume Barca) is a tributary river that flows from the Eritrean Highlands to the plains of Sudan. With a length of over 640 kilometres or 400 miles, it rises just outside Asmara and flows in a northwestern direction through Agordat. The river merges with the Anseba River near the border with Sudan.

In Sudan, the Barka flows seasonally to a delta on the Red Sea, near the town of Tokar.

== See also ==
- List of rivers of Eritrea
- List of rivers of Sudan
