= Tekezé River =

River in Ethiopia

Tekezé River Setit River
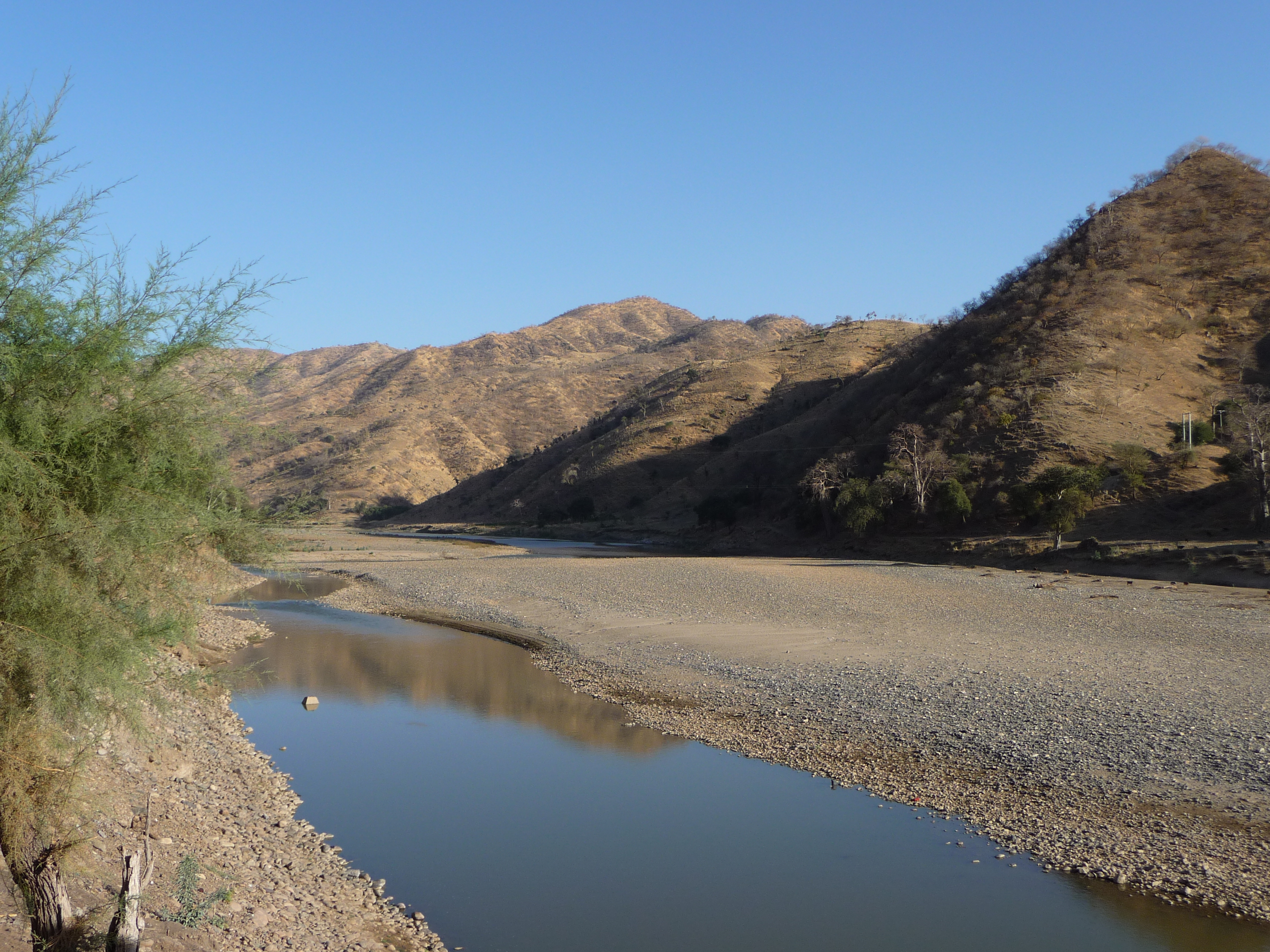

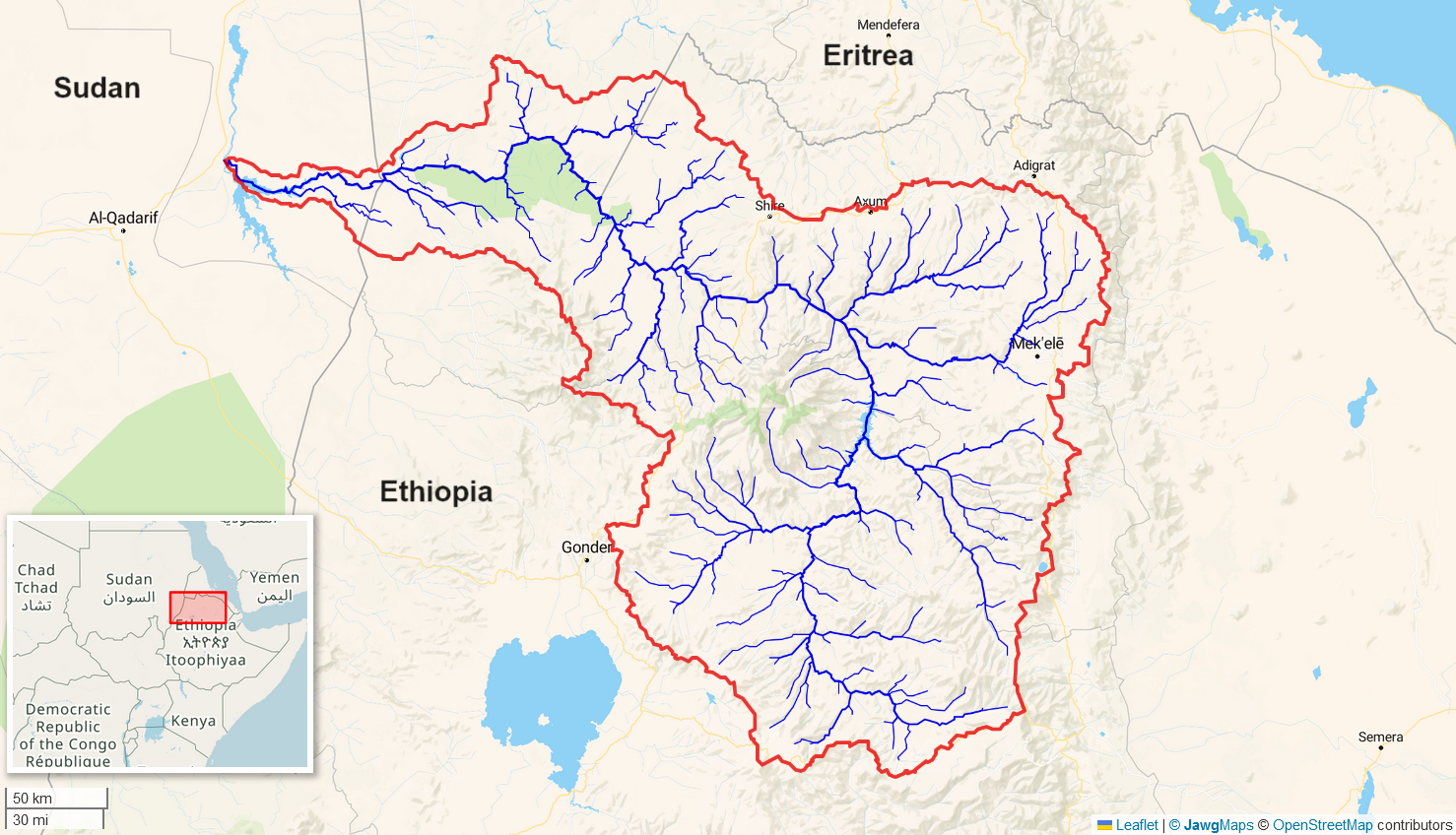
- Tekezé-Senit River Watershed (Interactive map)

Location
- Countries: Eritrea; Ethiopia; Sudan

Physical characteristics
- Source: Ethiopian Highlands
  - location: Birkumit, Ethiopia
  - coordinates: 12°05′13″N 39°20′17″E
  - elevation: 3,110 m (10,200 ft)
- Mouth: Atbarah River
  - location: near Wad Muzammil, Eritrea / Ethiopia / Sudan border
  - coordinates: 14.257°N 36.560°E
  - elevation: 540 m (1,770 ft)
- Length: 608 km (378 mi)
- Basin size: 64,210 km^{2} (24,790 mi^{2})

Basin features
- Progression: Atbarah River → Nile → Mediterranean Sea
- River system: Nile

The Tekezé River (Amharic: ተከዜ; Tigrinya: ተከዘ, originally meaning "river" in Ge’ez; Arabic: تكازي, also spelled Takkaze; Italian: fiume Tacazzè), is a major river in Ethiopia. For part of its course it forms a section of the westernmost border of Ethiopia and Eritrea. The river is also known as the Setit (Arabic: سيتيت) as it joins the Nile tributary Atbarah River just over the border in Sudan. According to materials published by the Ethiopian Central Statistical Agency, the Tekezé River is 608 kilometers (378 mi) long. The canyon which it has created is the deepest in Africa and one of the deepest in the world, at some points having a depth of over 2000 meters (6,562 feet).

== Course ==
The Tekezé River rises in the central Ethiopian Highlands near Mount Qachen within Lasta, from where it flows west, north, then west again, forming the westernmost border of Ethiopia and Eritrea from the confluence of the Tomsa with the Tekezé at 14°11′N 37°31.7′E to the tripoint between the two countries and Sudan at 14°15′27″N 36°33′37″E. After entering northeastern Sudan at the tripoint it joins the Atbarah River, which is a tributary of the Nile. The Tekezé is perhaps the true upper course of the Atbarah, as the former follows the longer course prior to the confluence of the two rivers.

The names of its main tributaries in Ethiopia from its source are: on the right bank Tahali, Meri, Tellare, Sullo, Arekwa, Gheoa, Wari, Firafira, Tocoro, and Gumalo Rivers; on the left bank Nili, Balagas, Saha, Bembea, Ataba, Zarima, and Kwalema Rivers.

== History ==
The earliest known mention of the Tekezé is in an inscription from Aksum of king Ezana of Axum, where he boasts of a victory in a battle on its lower banks, near "the ford of Kemalke". The Tekezé served as an early link between Ethiopia and Egypt; for example, the Kebra Nagast, which received its current form in the 13th century, states that king Menelik I returned to Ethiopia by following this river from Egypt (ch. 53). Augustus B. Wylde records a related tradition that near the source of the Tekezé, at the location of Eyela Kudus Michael church, is the true resting-place of the Ark of the Covenant.

Between February and March 1936, during the Second Italo-Abyssinian War, thousands of Ethiopian troops were killed when the Italian Royal Air Force (Regia Aeronautica) attacked them with bombs and mustard gas as they retreated across the Tekezé. In a successful Ethiopian counter-offensive, the Italians were forced to fall back from the Tekezé to Axum after the battle at Dembeguina Pass.

On 1 July 2021, the bridge crossing the Tekezé river was destroyed during the Tigray War. The International Rescue Committee was concerned that the humanitarian aid efforts in the region would be "even more severely hampered than before."

== Tekezé dam ==
The Ethiopian government announced in July 2002 that they had formed a partnership with the China National Water Resources and Hydropower Engineering Corporation to construct a hydroelectric dam on the Tekezé, which would generate 300 megawatts of electricity. The project would cost US$224 million and take five years to complete. Oweys Ibrahim, the project coordinator, announced on 12 December 2007 that construction was 82% complete, and included a 105-kilometer power line to Mekele.

The Tekeze Hydro Electric project constructed the highest double curve arch dam in Africa, topping the previous highest, in Lesotho. The contractors behind the project were CWGS and it was completed in 2009. The resulting reservoir is 105 km^{2} large and it has a capacity of 9.3 billion m³ of water.

== Gallery ==
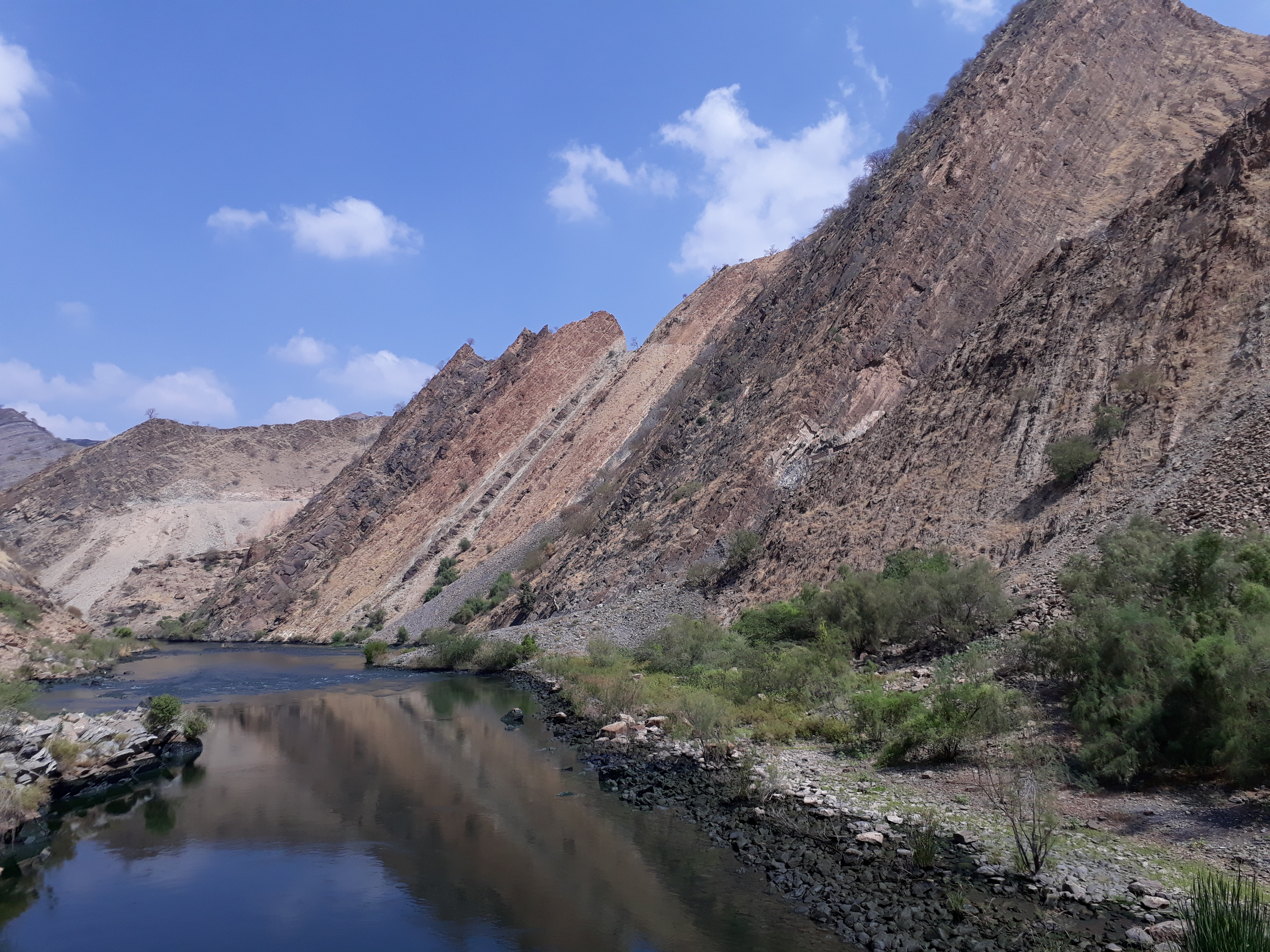
Tekezé gorge, a few km downstream from the reservoir

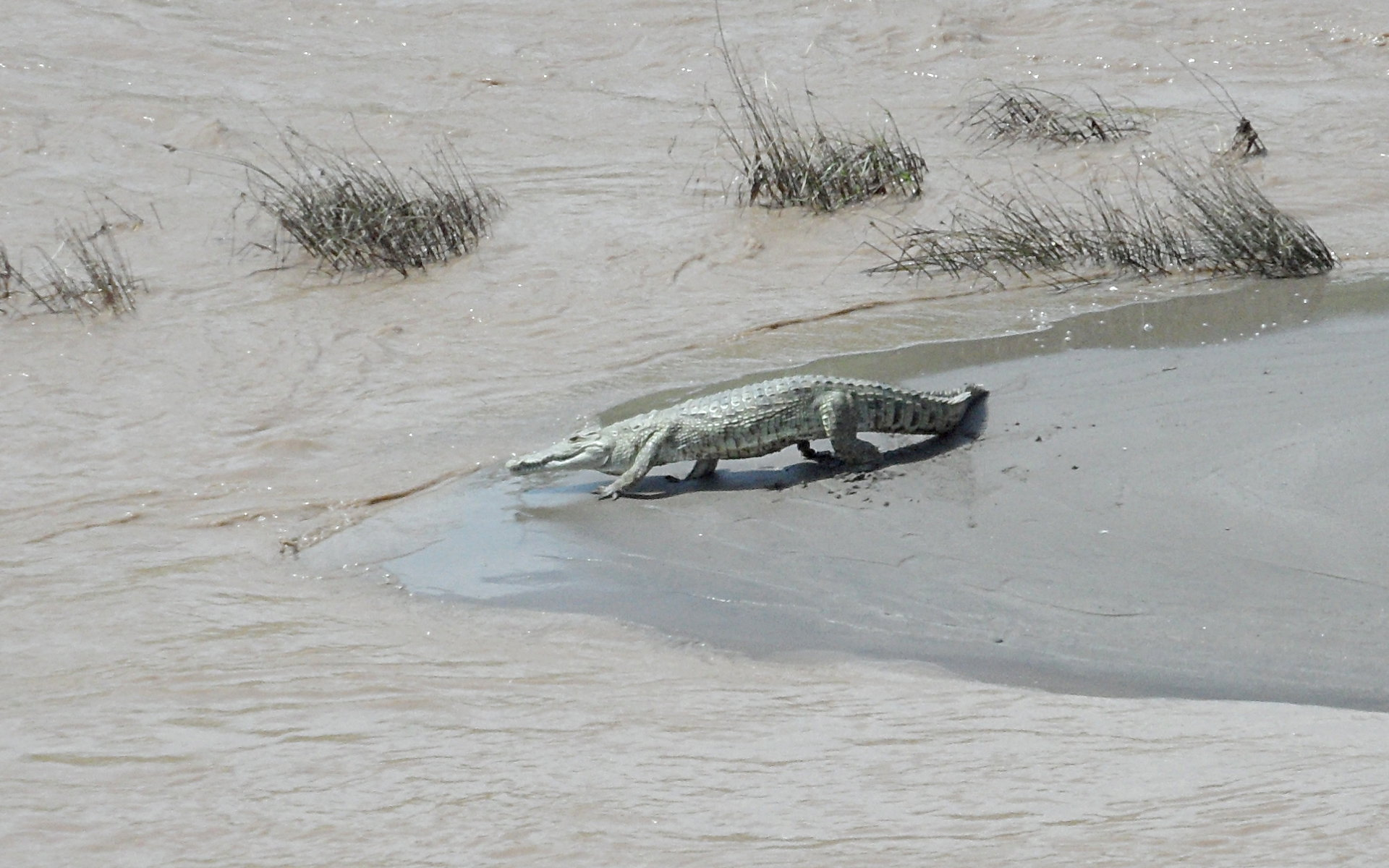
A crocodile along the Tekezé River

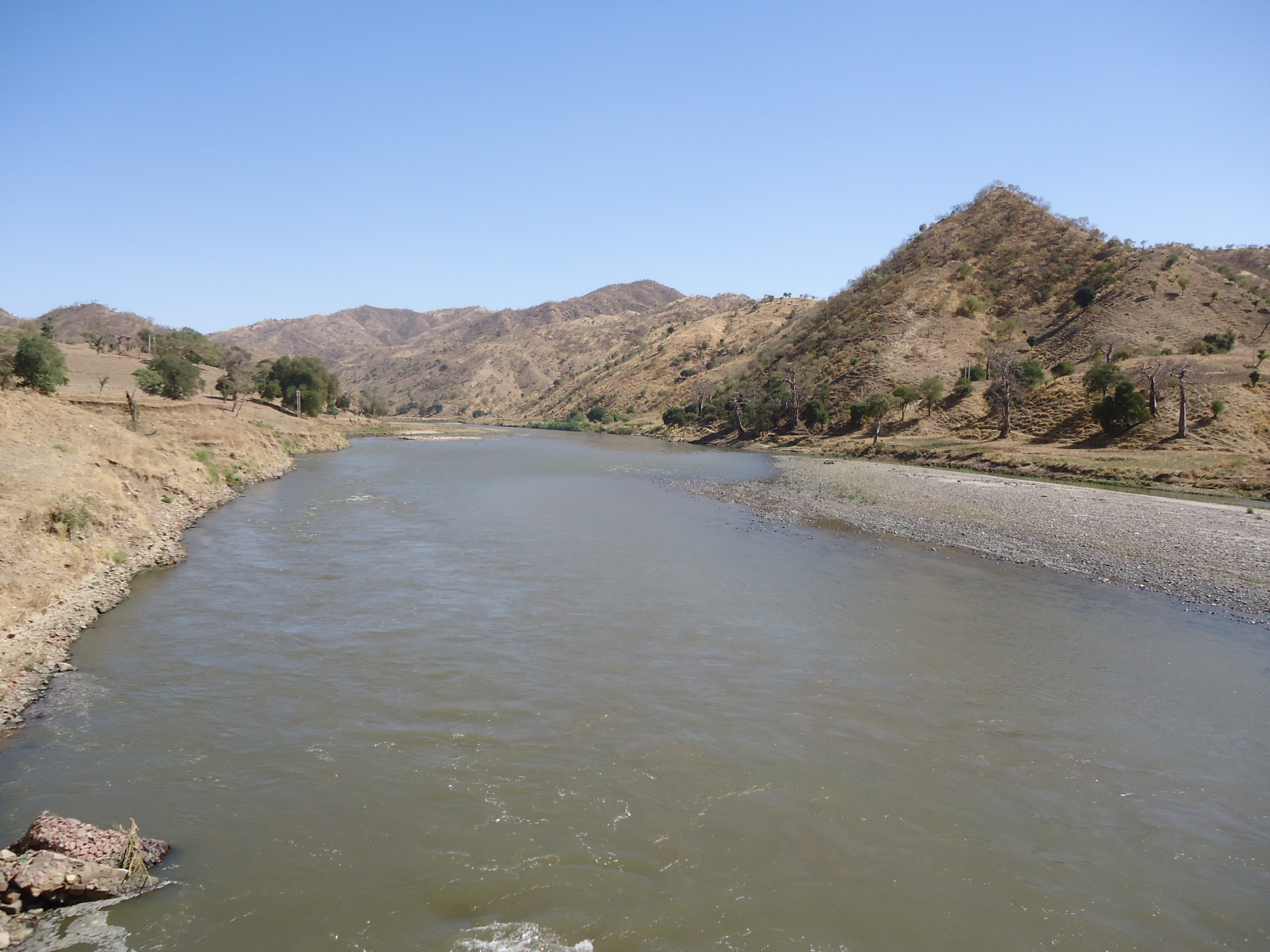
A crossing at the Tekezé

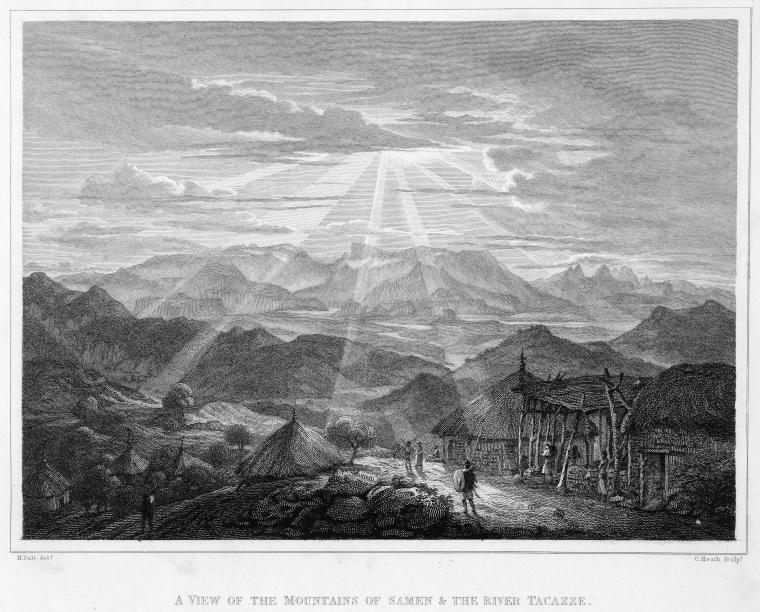
"A view of the mountains of Samen & the River Tacazze", by Henry Salt and Charles Heath (1814)

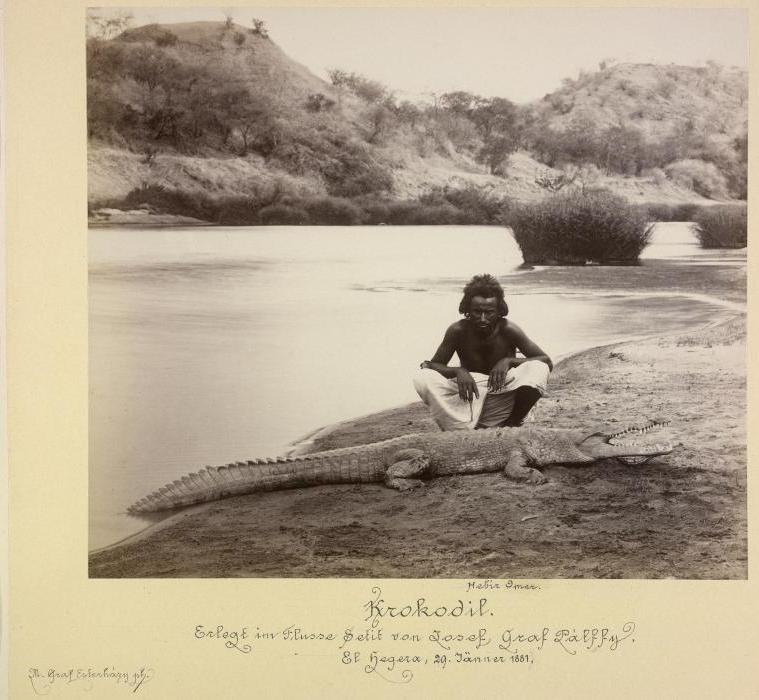
Unknown person sitting next to a killed crocodile, 1881

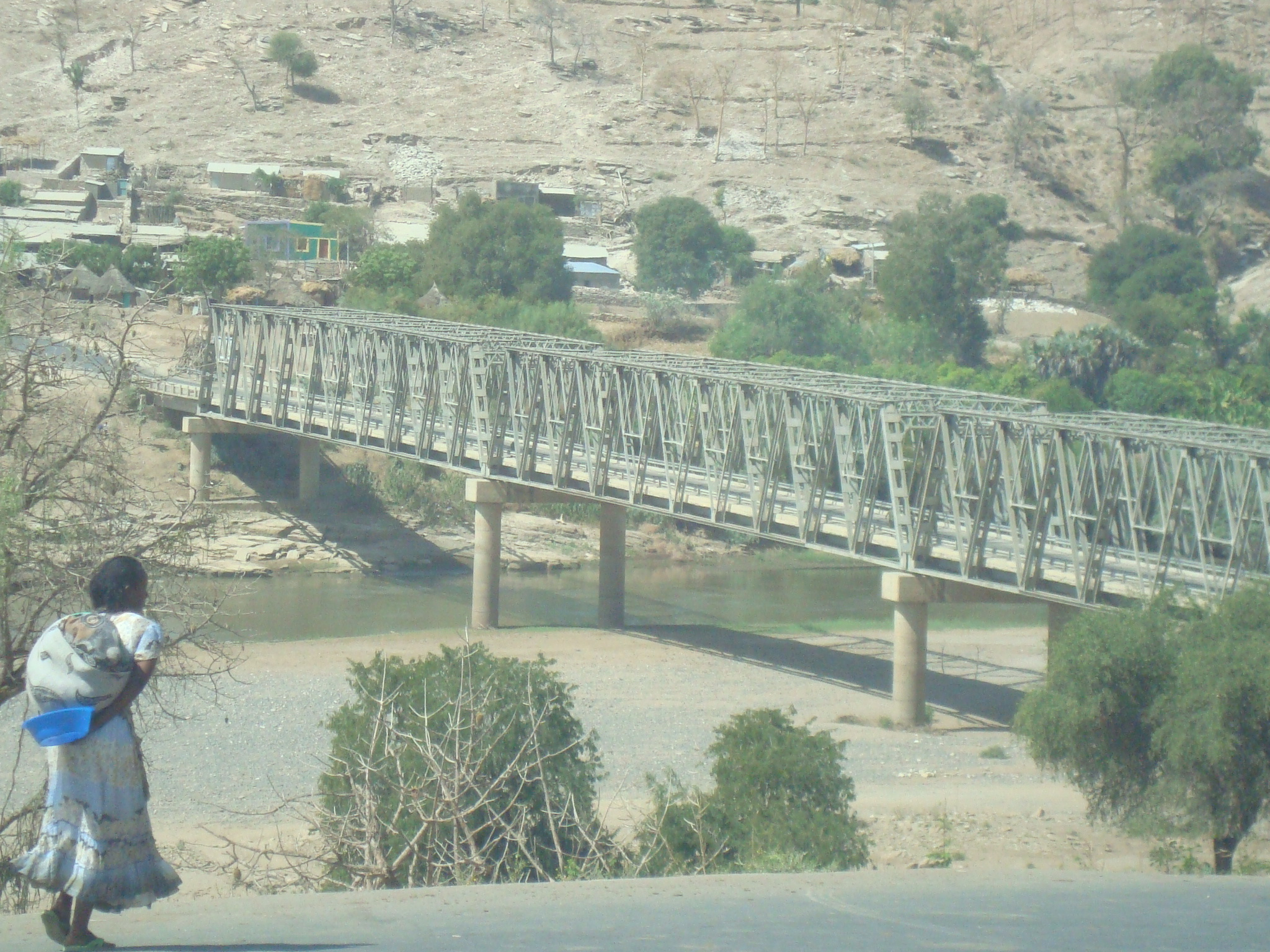
Tekeze bridge, 2017

== See also ==
- List of rivers of Eritrea
- List of rivers of Ethiopia
- List of rivers of Sudan
