= Damas River (Eritrea) =

River in Eritrea

Location
- Country: Eritrea

Physical characteristics
- Source
  - location: 15°24′52.070″N 39°3′40.590″E
- Mouth
  - coordinates: 15°42′42.088″N 39°6′17.467″E

The Damas River is a seasonal river in Eritrea. It passes outside the town of Ghinda.

== See also ==
- List of rivers of Eritrea
