= Anseba River =

Tributary river in Eritrea

Anseba Shet'
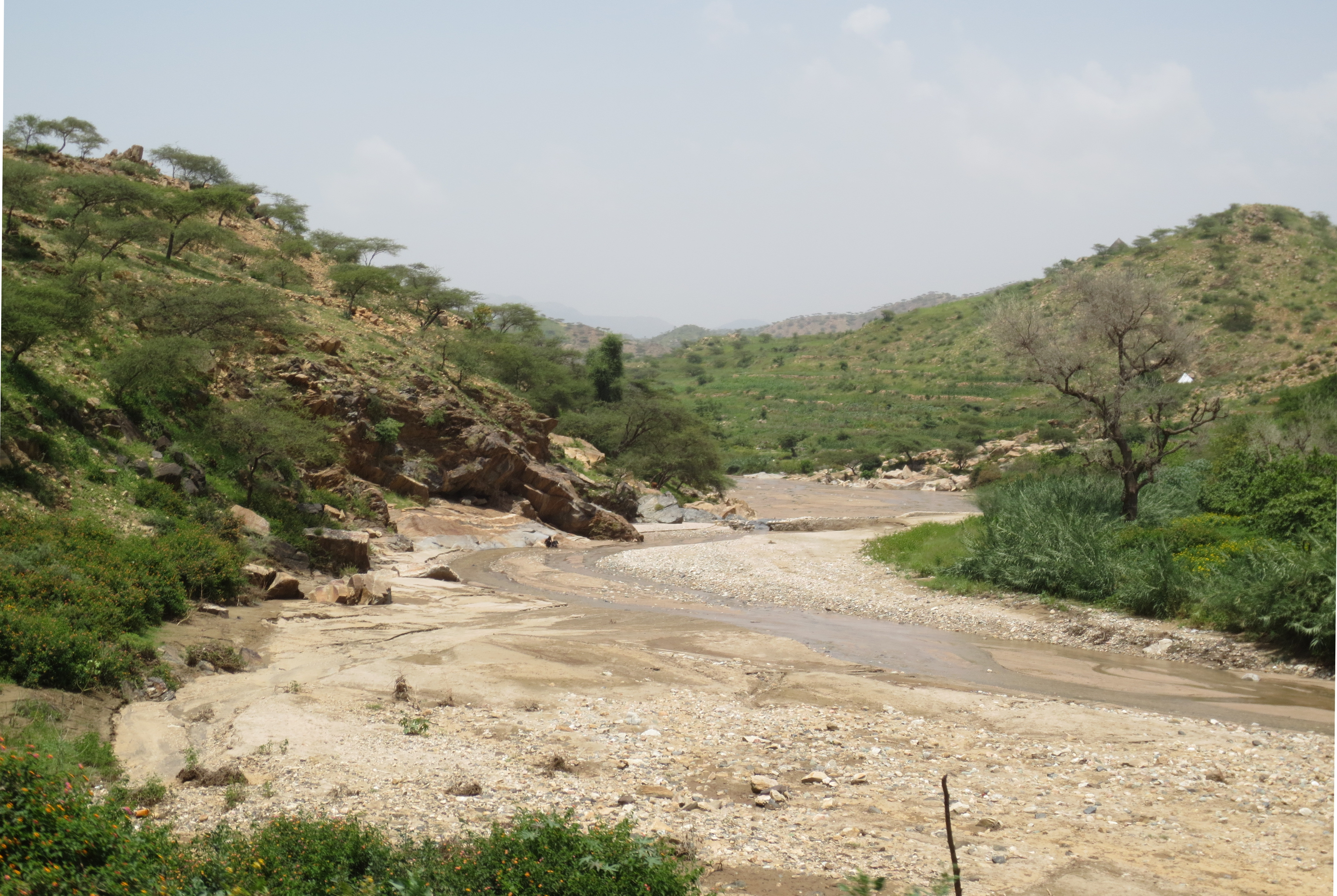

Location
- Country: Eritrea

Physical characteristics
- Source
  - location: Eritrean Highlands
- Mouth
  - location: into Barka River near Per Tokar
  - coordinates: 17°00′19″N 37°25′25″E
- Length: 346 km (215 mi)
- Basin size: 12,100 km^{2} (4,700 sq mi)

Basin features
- River system: Barka River

The Anseba River (Tigrinya: ሩባ ዓንሰባ, Tigre: عنسبا) is a tributary of the Barka River in Eritrea with a length of 346 kilometres. It rises in the Eritrean Highlands outside Asmara and flows in a northwestern direction through Keren. It merges with the Barka River near the border with Sudan.
