= Anseba region =

Administrative region in northern Eritrea

Anseba Region ዞባ ዓንሰባ (Tigrinya) إقليم عنسبا (Arabic)
- Region
- Anseba Region in Eritrea
- Coordinates: 16°00′N 38°00′E
- Country: Eritrea
- Capital: Keren

Government
  - Administrator: Ali Mahmoud

Area
  - Total: 23,200 km^{2} (9,000 sq mi)

Population
  - Total: 893,587
  - Density: 38.5/km^{2} (99.8/sq mi)
- Demonym: Anseban
- ISO 3166 code: ER-AN
- HDI (2022): 0.450 low · 4th

Anseba region (Tigrinya: ዞባ ዓንሰባ, Arabic: إقليم عنسبا) is an administrative region of Eritrea, located in northern Eritrea. The capital and the most populous city in the region is Keren. The region is named after Anseba River, which passed through most parts of the region. The average elevation in the region is around 1,800 m (5,900 ft) to 2,100 m (6,900 ft). The hottest month is May recording temperatures up to 30 °C (86 °F), while the coldest month is December to February when it reaches freezing temperature. The region received around 508 mm (20.0 in) of rainfall and the soil is conducive for agriculture.

As of 2005, the region had a population of 549,000 compared to a population of 484,200 in 2001. The net growth rate was 11.80 per cent. The total area of the province was 23200.00 km^{2} and the density was 23.66 persons per km^{2}.

== Geography ==
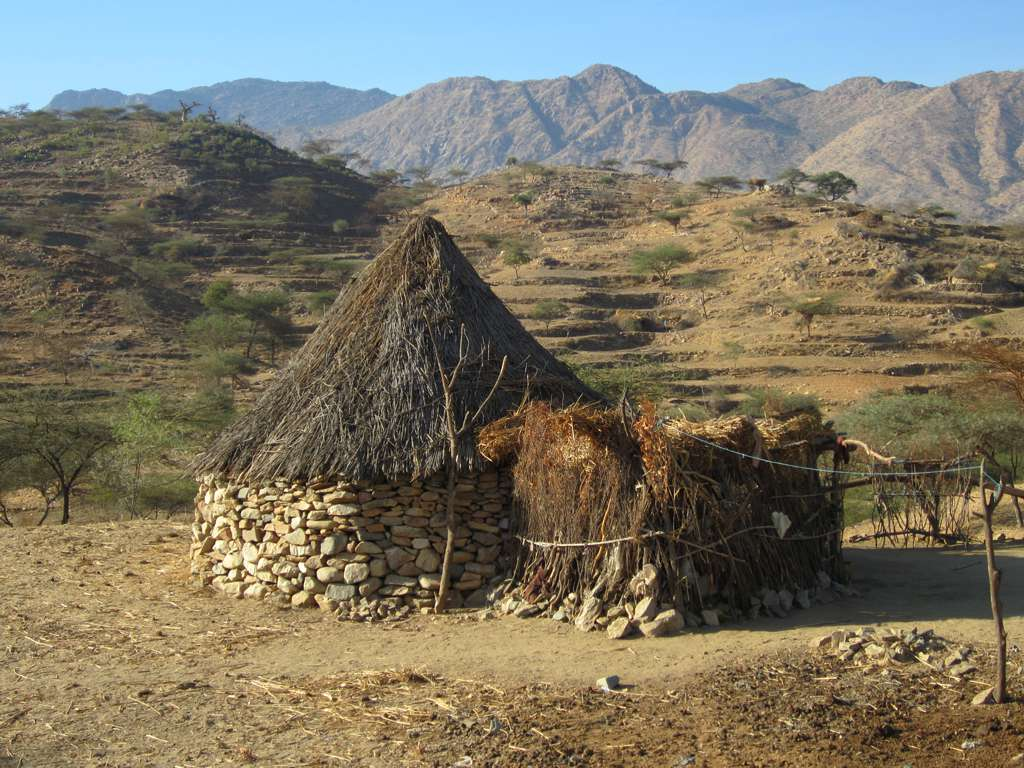
A typical house with mountain range in the background

The capital of Anseba region is Keren and it has an area of about 23,000 km^{2}. It is named after the Anseba River around which the region is situated. The river begins in the central Eritrean highland plateau, in the suburbs northwest of the capital Asmara. It then descends northwards into the northwestern lowlands, traversing the mountains of Rora Habab and Sahel before joining the Barka River near the border with Sudan. Other towns in this region include Halhal. The region borders Gash-Barka to the south, the Maekel (Central) region to the south-east, the Northern Red Sea Region to the east and north, and the Sudan to the west. The topography of the region has highland plateau, which are cooler than the regions around the coastal plains. There are two rainy seasons, the heavier one during summer and the lighter one during spring. The climate and geography of the region along with other regions of Eritrea is similar to the one of Ethiopia. The average elevation in the region is around 1,800 m (5,900 ft) to 2,100 m (6,900 ft). The hottest month is May recording temperatures up to 30 °C (86 °F), while the coldest month is December to February when it reaches freezing temperature. The region received around 508 mm (20.0 in) of rainfall and the soil is conducive for agriculture.

There are a number of flora and fauna species within this region. Notably this was historic habitat for the endangered painted hunting dog (Lycaon pictus), a canid which is now thought to be extirpated from the region. Eritrea as a whole was extensively forested as recently as 1900. However, at present the total forest cover of Eritrea is less than one percent.

== Demographics ==
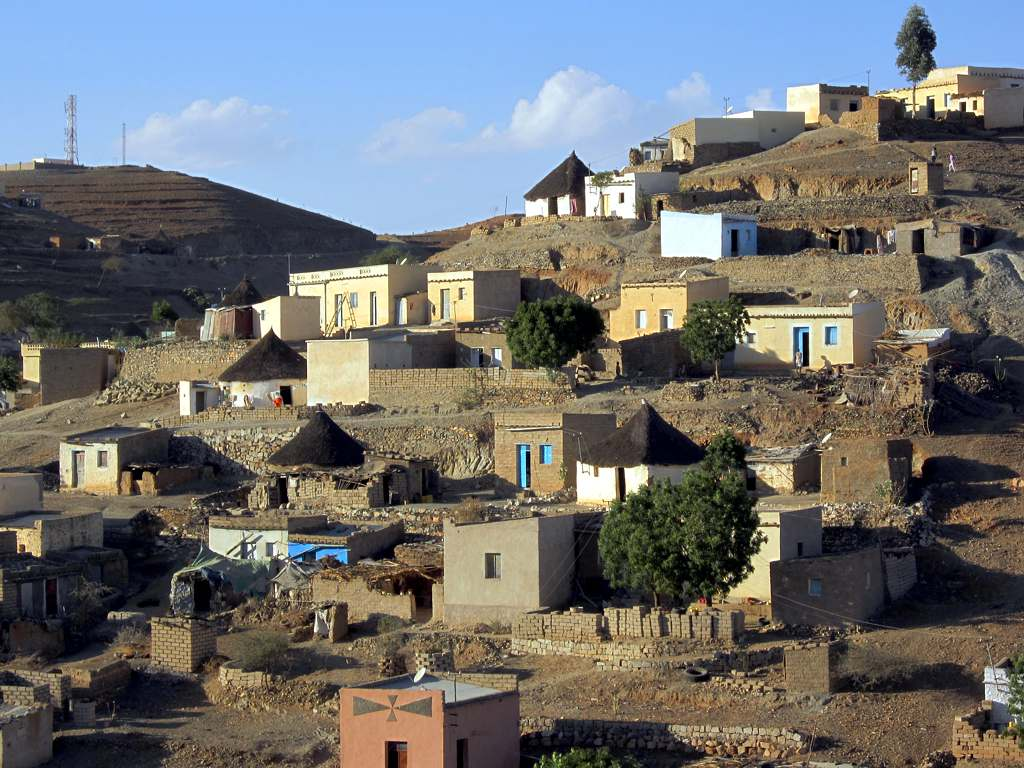
Houses in Keren.

As of 2005, the region had a population of 549,000 compared to a population of 484,200 in 2001. The net growth rate was 11.80 per cent. The total area of the province was 23200.00 km^{2} and the density was 23.66 persons per km^{2}. As of 2002, the Total Fertility Rate (TFR), defined as the children per woman was 5.6. The General Fertility Rate (GFR), defined as the births per 1,000 women between the ages of 15 and 45 remained at 184.0. The Crude Birth Rate (CBR), the number of births per 1,000 population, was 35.0. The percentage of women pregnant as of 2002 out of the total population was 8.8 per cent. The mean number of children ever born stood at 6.3. The Infant Mortality Rate (IMR), defined as the number of deaths of children for every 1,000 born was 37.0 while the Child Mortality Rate (CMR), defined as the number of child deaths for every 1,000 children 5 years of age was 37.0. The under-5 mortality rate stood at 73.0. The number of children with the prevalence of Acute Respiratory Infection (ARI) was 877, fever was 877, and Diarrhea was 877. The number of women with the knowledge of AIDS was 1,130 and the number of people with no knowledge of the disease or its prevention was 0.0 per cent.

== Education and economy ==
As of 2002, the number of males completing or attending highest level of schooling in the region was 2,028 while it was 2,368 females. The per centage of literate males was 52.30 and the percentage of literate females was 36.60. A fraction of 45.70 males had no education, while the corresponding number for females was 60.20. The fraction of males completing secondary school stood at 2.50 and the fraction of males completing more than secondary was 000. The corresponding numbers for females was 1.00 and 000 respectively.

As of 2002, the number of people engaged in Professional/technical/managerial activities was 10.90 per cent, Clerical was 6.10 per cent, Sales and services was 16.80 per cent, Skilled Manual was 5.00 per cent, Unskilled Manual was 0.00 per cent, Domestic Service was 15.90 per cent and Agriculture was 45.40 per cent. The total number of employed men was 1,436 and the total number of employed women was 1,421. The number of men who were paid their total earnings in cash was 64.70 per cent, in kind was 0.80 and in both was 30.30. The number of women who were paid their total earnings in cash was 76.80 per cent, in kind was 4.00 per cent and in both was 13.30 per cent.

== Administration ==
The region is divided in ten subregions:

- Adi Tekelezan subregion
- Asmat subregion
- Elabered subregion
- Geleb subregion
- Hagaz subregion
- Halhal subregion
- Habero subregion
- Keren subregion
- Kerkebet subregion
- Sela subregion

Eritrea has a one-party national assembly governed by People's Front for Democracy and Justice (PFDJ; originally Eritrean Peoples Liberation Front), an authoritarian government. From the time of independence since 30 May 1991, the country has been continuing with a transitional government elected during the elections in April 1993. The scheduled elections in 2001 has been postponed indefinitely. The regional and local elections are conducted on a periodic basis on a restricted framework. All men and women of any ethnic or religious background are eligible to vote. No parties or groups other than the PFDJ are allowed to contest and the elections are presided by representatives from the PDFJ. Policy decisions should be centered around the party mandate and opposition and dissenters have been imprisoned.
