= List of rivers of Ethiopia =

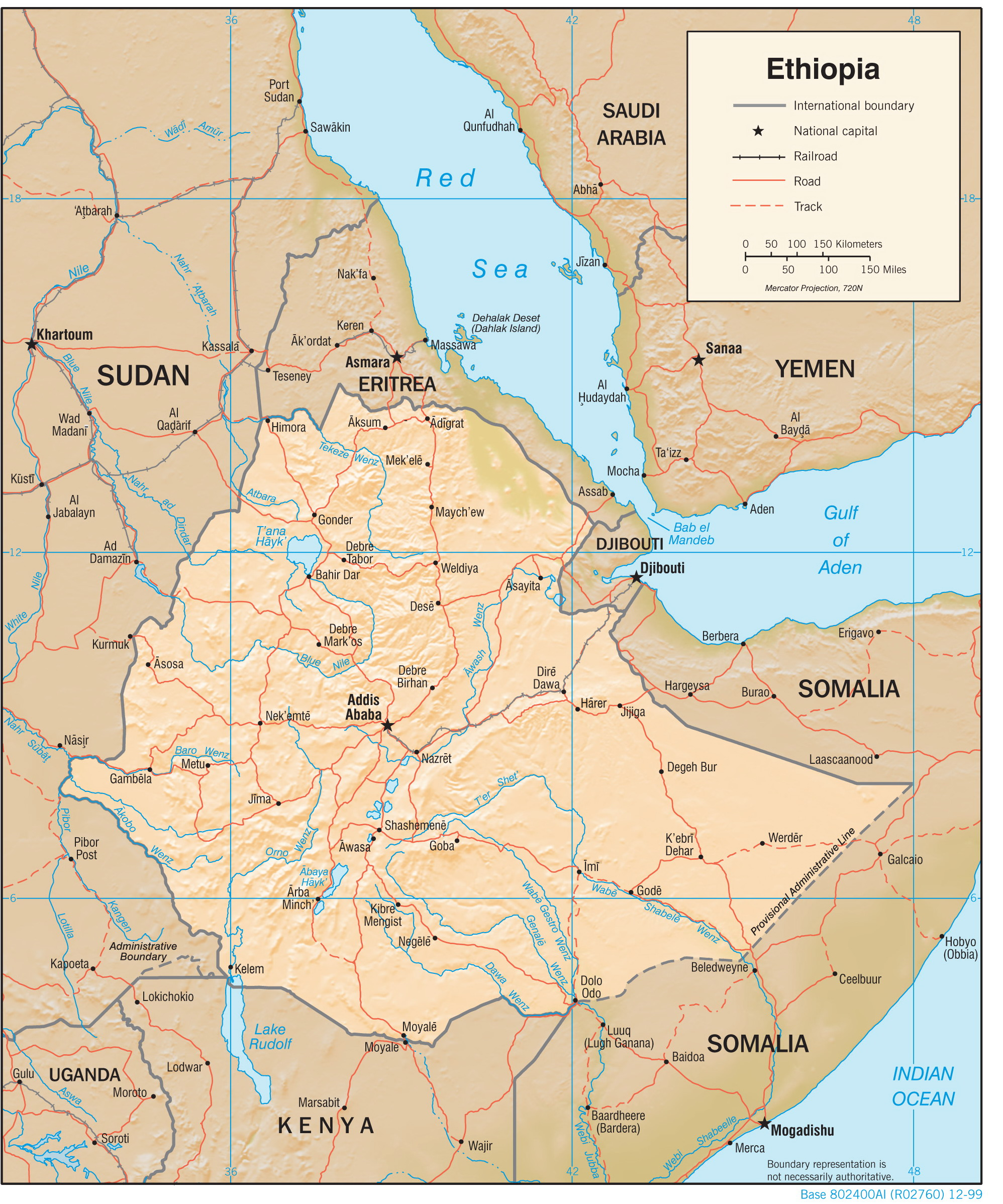
Map of Ethiopia showing some of the main rivers

This is a list of streams and rivers in Ethiopia, arranged geographically by drainage basin. There is an alphabetic list at the end of this article.

== Flowing into the Mediterranean ==
- Nile (Egypt, Sudan)

=== Atbarah River ===
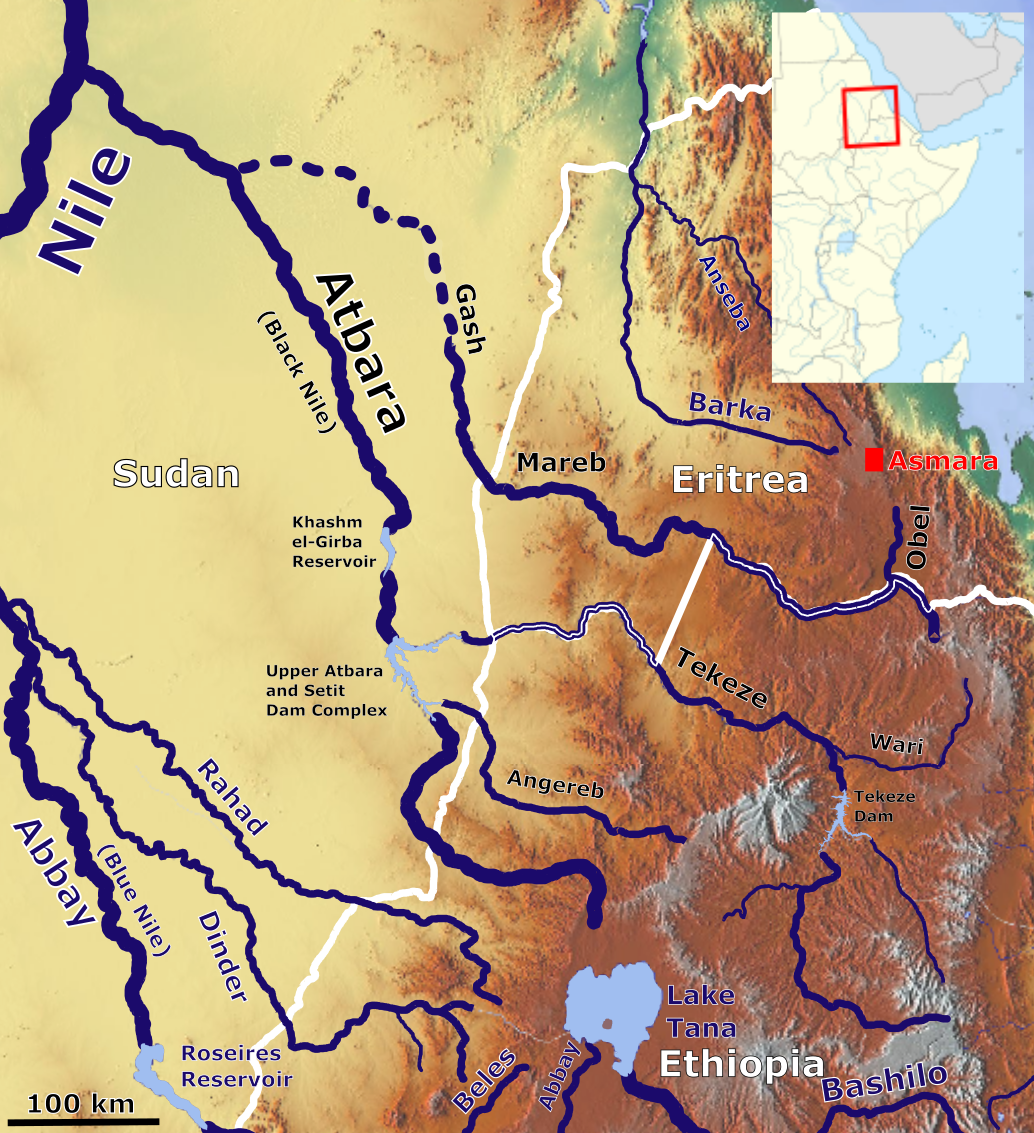
A map of the Atbara River drainage basin

- Mareb River (or Gash River) (only reaches the Atbarah in times of flood)
  - Obel River
  - Belessa
- Tekezé River (or Takkaze or Setit)
  - Zarima River
  - Ataba River
  - Wari River
    - Qortem Zer'a
    - Tsaliet
      - Agefet
        - Ab'aro
        - Azef River
        - Amblo
      - Korowya
      - Ferrey River
      - Kidane Mihret River
      - May Meqa
      - Graliwdo
  - Giba River
    - Tanqwa
      - Tsech'i River
      - May Qoqah
      - Arwadito
      - Adawro River
    - May Selelo
    - Zikuli River
    - Gra Adiam River, also called Bitchoqo River
    - Zeyi River
    - Inda Sillasie River
      - May Zegzeg
        - May Harena
        - May Sho'ate
      - May Be'ati River
    - Addi Keshofo River
    - May Gabat
    - Inda Anbesa
    - Ruba Bich'i River
    - Hurura
      - Afedena River
        - May Ayni
      - Shimbula
    - Ilala River
    - Qarano River
    - Agula'i River
    - Genfel
    - Sulluh
      - Ch'eqofo River
  - Balagas River
- Angereb River (or Greater Angereb River)
- Shinfa River

=== Blue Nile (or Abay River) ===
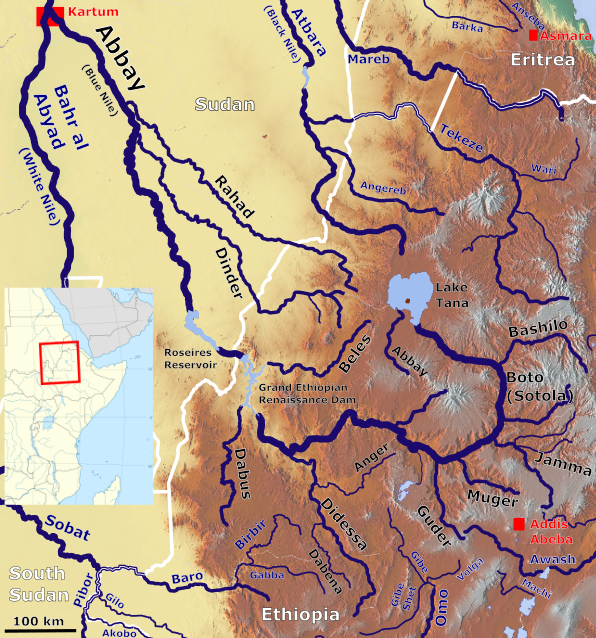
A map of the Abbay River drainage basin

- Rahad River
- Dinder River
- Beles River
- Dabus River
- Didessa River
  - Hanger River (or Angar River)
    - Wajja River
- Birr River
  - Temcha River
    - Gulla River
- Guder River
- Muger River
- Jamma River
  - Wanchet River
    - Qechene River
- Walaqa River
- Bashilo River
  - Checheho River
- Lake Tana, into which flow
  - Gilgel Abay
  - Magech River
    - Lesser Angereb River
  - Reb River
  - Gumara River
- Adar River (South Sudan)
  - Yabus River
  - Daga River (Deqe Sonka Shet)

=== Sobat River (South Sudan) ===
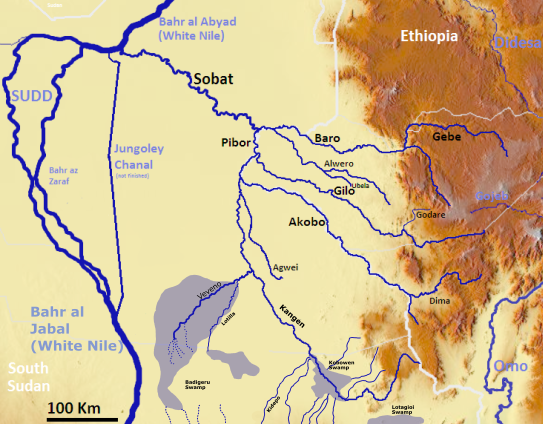
A map of the Sobat River drainage basin

- Baro River
  - Jikawo River
  - Alero River (or Alwero River)
  - Birbir River
    - Dipa River
      - Kobara River
        - Qarsa River
    - Sor River
  - Gebba River
- Pibor River
  - Gilo River
    - Dembi River
  - Akobo River
    - Cechi River
    - Chiarini River
    - Owag River
    - Neubari River
    - Ajuba River
    - Kaia River

== Flowing into the Indian Ocean ==
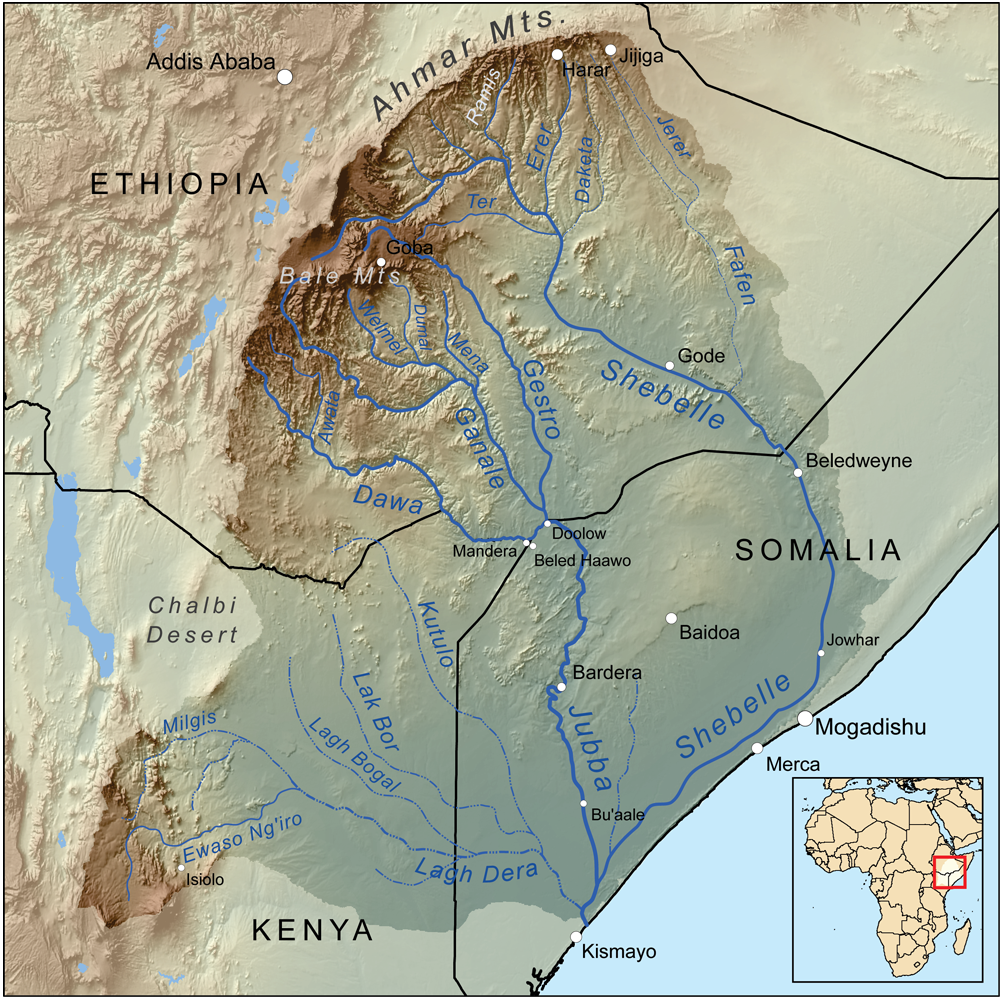
A map of the Jubba River and Shebelle River drainage basin

- Jubba River
  - Shebelle River
    - Fafen River (only reaches the Shebelle in times of flood)
      - Jerer River
    - Erer River
    - Ramis River
      - Galetti River
      - Mojo River
    - Dungeta River
  - Ganale Dorya River
    - Mena River
    - Weyib River or Gestro River
    - Welmel River
  - Dawa River
    - Kojowa River
    - Aflata River
    - Awata River

== Flowing into endorheic basins ==
=== Afar Depression ===
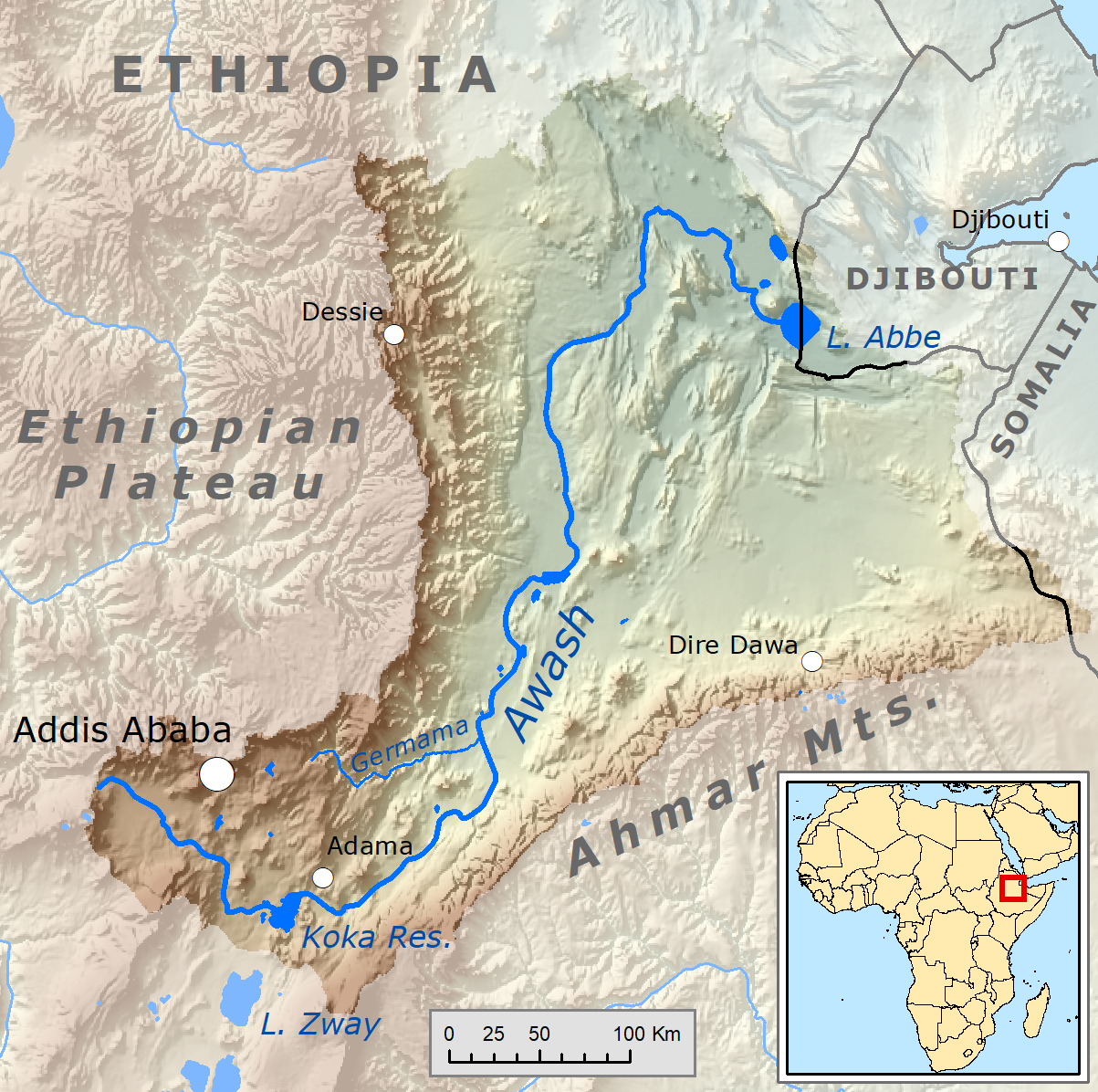
A map of the Awash River

- Awash River
  - Logiya River
  - Mille River
    - Ala River
    - Golima River
  - Borkana River
  - Ataye River
  - Hawadi River
  - Kabenna River
  - Germama River (or Kasam River)
  - Gololcha River
  - Dukem River
  - Keleta River
  - Akaki River
    - Sendafa River
- Dechatu River

=== Lake Ziway ===
- Meki River
- Katar River

=== Lake Turkana ===
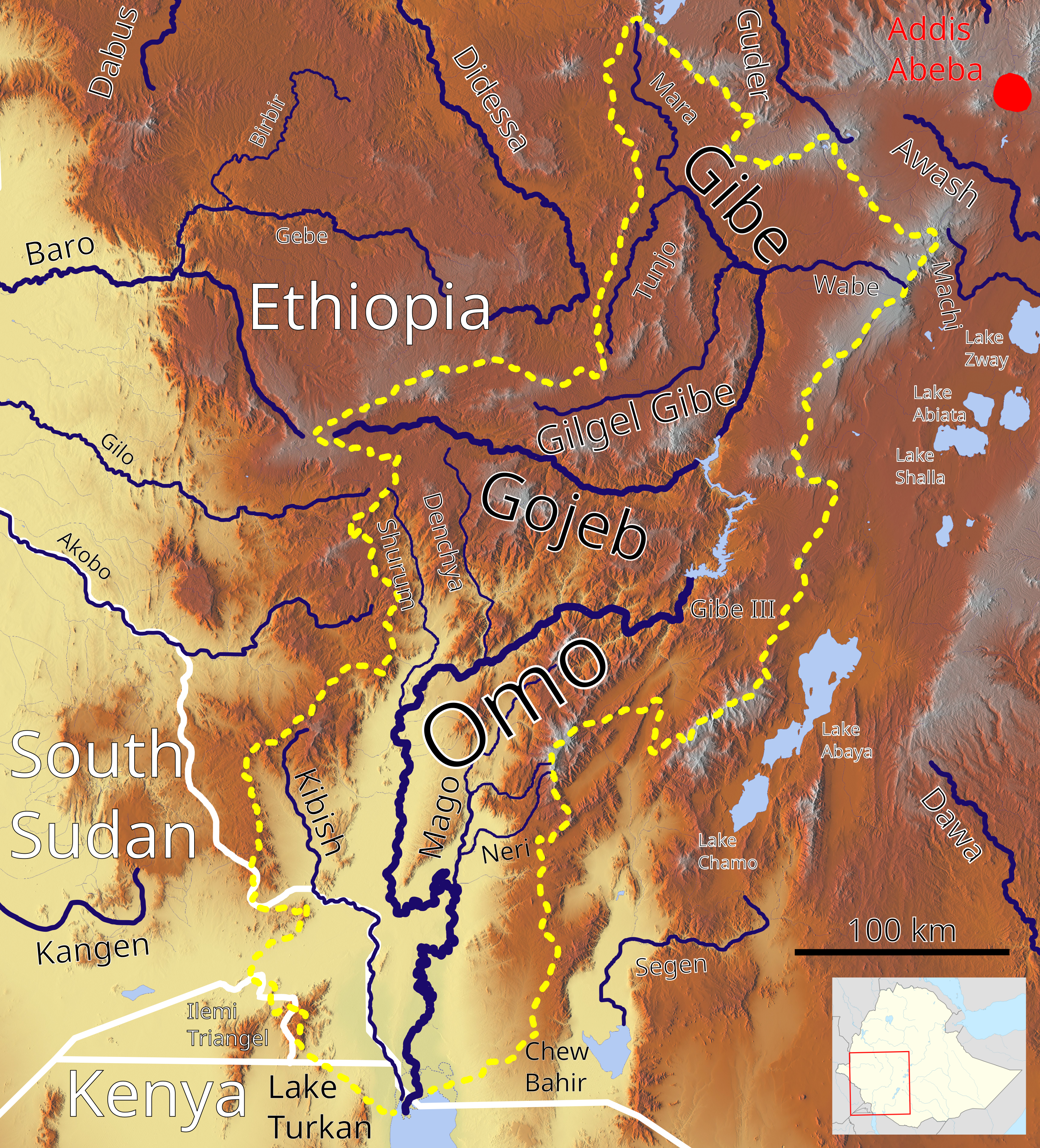
A map of the Omo River

- Kibish River
- Omo River
  - Usno River
    - Mago River
    - Neri River
  - Mui River
  - Mantsa River
  - Zigina River
  - Denchya River
  - Gojeb River
  - Gibe River
    - Gilgel Gibe River
    - Maze River
  - Wabe River

=== Lake Abaya ===
- Bilate River
- Gidabo River

=== Lake Chew Bahir ===
- Weito River
  - Sagan River

== Alphabetic list ==
=== A to G ===
Abay River - Adabay River - Akaki River - Akobo River - Ala River - Alero River - Angereb River - Ataba River - Ataye River - Atbarah River - Awash River - Awetu River - Ayesha River-Dhadheba River-Lugita River

Balagas River - Bantyiketu River - Baro River - Bashilo River - Beles River - Bilate River - Birbir River - Blue Nile - Borkana River

Cheleleka River

Dabus River - Dawa River - Dechatu River - Dembi River - Denchya River - Didessa River - Dinder River - Doha River - Dukem River

Erer River

Fafen River

Galetti River - Ganale Dorya River - Gebba River - Gebele River - Germama River - Gestro River - Gidabo River - Gibe River - Gilgel Gibe River - Gilo River - Gojeb River - Golima River - Gololcha River - Greater Angereb River - Guder River - Gumara River

=== H to L ===
Hanger River - Hawadi River

Jamma River - Jerer River - Jikawo River - Jubba River

Kabenna River - Karsa River - Katar River - Keleta River - Kibish River - Kulfo River

Lagabora River - Lesser Abay - Lesser Angereb - Logiya River

=== M to S ===
Mago River - Magech River - Mareb River - Meki River - Mena River - Mille River - Modjo River - Mofar River - Muger River - Mui River

Neri River

Omo River

Pibor River

Qechene River

Rahad River - Reb River - Robe River

Sagan River - Shebelle River - Shinfa River - Sor River

=== T to Z ===
Tekezé River Tella River Usno River - Ubbi Ubbi River

Wabe River - Walaqa River - Wajja River - Wanchet River - Wari River - Weito River - Weyib River - Welmel River

Yabus River

Zarima River
