= Bantyiketu River =

River in Ethiopia

Location
- Country: Ethiopia
- Region: Addis Ababa
- City: Addis Ababa

Physical characteristics
- Source: Ethiopian Highlands
  - location: Mount Entoto and surrounding highlands
- Mouth: Akaki River
  - location: Addis Ababa, Ethiopia

Basin features
- Progression: Bantyiketu River → Akaki River → Aba Samuel Reservoir → Awash River
- River system: Akaki River basin
- Landmarks: Aba Samuel Reservoir
- Main functions: Urban drainage, stormwater conveyance, tributary of the Akaki River

Bantyiketu River is an urban river located in Addis Ababa (meaning "new flower"), the capital of Ethiopia, and it forms a part of the Akaki River basin, which collects water from much of the capital city and the surrounding highlands.

== Course and location ==
The Bantyiketu River is one of the several rivers that forms part of the Akaki River basin in Addis Ababa. It flows through urban and peri-urban areas of the city before joining other tributaries that flows into the Akaki River system and also the Aba Samuel Reservoir. The river system of Addis Ababa has multiple small streams that comes from surrounding highlands such as Mount Entoto and Wechecha, which drains into the Akaki River system. Bantyiketu is listed among these tributaries in hydrological descriptions of the Akaki catchment.

== Hydrology ==
The river is strongly influenced by the tropical highland climate of central Ethiopia. Flow is highly seasonal, with peak discharge occurring during the rainy season (June to September), while reduced flow or partial drying may occur during the dry season. Like other rivers in the Akaki system, Bantyiketu contributes to stormwater runoff within the city and responds quickly to rainfall due to limited natural infiltration caused by urban development.

== Environmental condition ==
Bantyiketu River, like many urban rivers in Addis Ababa, is affected by environmental conditions that has to do with urbanization. These include solid waste disposal, untreated wastewater discharge, and erosion from construction activities. Studies of the Akaki River system show that many tributaries function as channels for urban waste, resulting in significantly degraded water quality across the basin.
