= Aweto =

Aweto may refer to:

- parasitic fungi of the genus Ophiocordyceps, particularly Ophiocordyceps robertsii and Ophiocordyceps sinensis
- Awetö people, an ethnic group of Brazil
- Awetö language, a language of Brazil

== See also ==
- Awetu River, in Ethiopia
