= Demographics of Ethiopia =

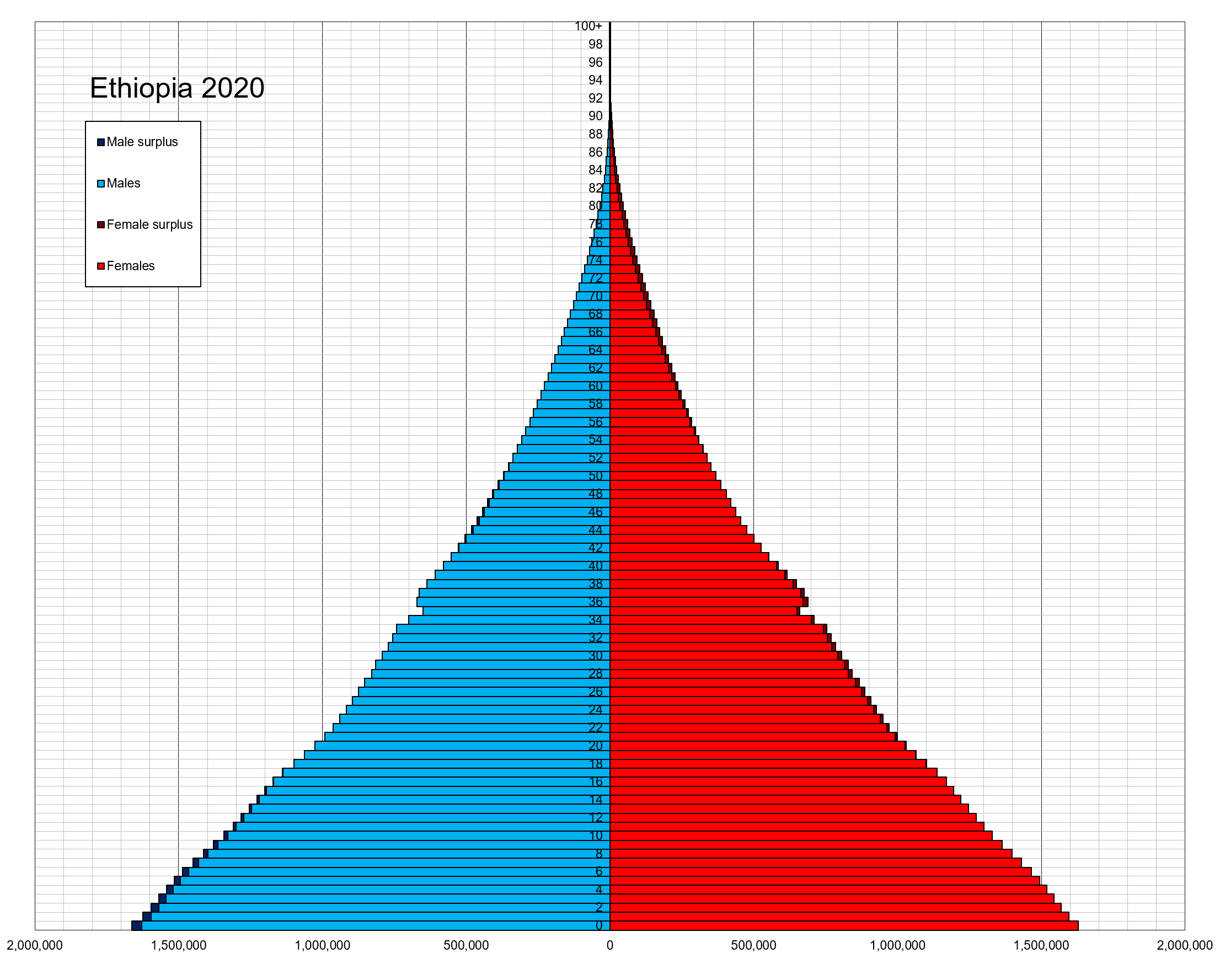
- Ethiopia population pyramid in 2020
- Population: 120,283,026
- Density: 109.3 people per.sq.km
- Growth rate: 2.5% (2021) (22nd)
- Birth rate: 30.8 births/1,000 population (2025 est.)
- Death rate: 5.8 deaths/1,000 population (2025 est.)
- Life expectancy: 68.25 years (2022 est.)
  - male: 66.12 years (2022 est.)
  - female: 70.44 years (2022 est.)
- Fertility rate: 3.81 children born/woman (2025 est.)
- Infant mortality: 34.4 deaths/1,000 live births (2021)
- Immigrant share: 0.9% (2024)

Sex ratio
- Total: 0.99 male(s)/female (2009 est.)
- At birth: 1.03 male(s)/female (2013 est.)
- Under 15: 1.00 male(s)/female (2009 est.)
- 15–64 years: 0.99 male(s)/female (2009 est.)
- 65 and over: 0.95 male(s)/female (2009 est.)

Nationality
- Major ethnic: See Ethnic Groups of Ethiopia

Language
- Official: See Languages of Ethiopia

The demographics of Ethiopia encompass the demographic features of inhabitants in Ethiopia, including ethnicity, languages, population density, education level, health, economic status, religious affiliations and other aspects of the population. The Official Ethiopian Statistics Services put the Ethiopian population for 2024 at 109 million, around 20 million less than UN Numbers.

== Population ==
Historical population
Year	Pop.	±% p.a.
1	1,000,000	—
1500	6,000,000	+0.12%
1900	10,742,000	+0.15%
2000	63,000,000	+1.78%
2011	85,555,555	+2.82%
2012	84,320,987	−1.44%
2013	86,613,986	+2.72%

Source: Central Statistical Agency (CSA)

Ethiopia is the most populous landlocked country in the world. Its total population has grown from 38.1 million in 1983 to 109.5 million in 2018. The population was only about nine million in the 19th century. The 2007 Population and Housing Census results show that the population of Ethiopia grew at an average annual rate of 2.6% between 1994 and 2007, down from 2.8% during the period 1983–1994. As of 2015, the population growth rate is among the top ten countries in the world. According to UN estimations, life expectancy in Ethiopia had improved over time, with male life expectancy reported to be 56 years and for women 60 years.

=== UN estimates ===
Population, fertility rate and net reproduction rate, United Nations estimates

According to the 2022 revision of the World Population Prospects, the total population was 120,283,026 in 2021, compared to 18,434,000 in 1950. The proportion of children below the age of 15 in 2010 was 41.5%, 55.8% was between 15 and 65 years of age, while 3.3% was 65 years or older. The average age was 25.1.

	Total population	Population aged 0–14 (%)	Population aged 15–64 (%)	Population aged 65+ (%)
1950	18 434 000	44.1	52.9	3
1955	20 298 000	43.9	53.3	2.8
1960	22 553 000	43.5	53.8	2.6
1965	25 480 000	43.5	53.9	2.6
1970	28 959 000	44.1	53.3	2.7
1975	32 959 000	44.5	52.7	2.8
1980	35 426 000	44.5	52.6	2.9
1985	41 078 000	44.6	52.6	2.9
1990	48 333 000	45.4	52.1	2.9
1995	57 042 000	45.9	51.2	2.9
2000	65 578 000	45.9	51.1	3.0
2005	74 264 000	44.5	52.4	3.1
2010	82 950 000	41.5	55.2	3.3

Population by Sex and Age Group (Census 29.V.2007):

Age group	Male	Female	Total	%
Total	37 217 130	36 533 802	73 750 932	100
0–4	5 482 792	5 314 230	10 797 022	14.64
5–9	6 106 788	5 874 976	11 981 764	16.25
10–14	5 412 324	4 999 913	10 412 237	14.12
15–19	4 454 710	4 293 338	8 748 048	11.86
20–24	3 098 338	3 303 747	6 402 085	8.68
25–29	2 622 759	3 039 429	5 662 188	7.68
30–34	2 088 208	2 131 858	4 220 066	5.72
35–39	1 827 296	1 949 346	3 776 642	5.12
40–44	1 464 529	1 408 451	2 872 980	3.90
45–49	1 150 017	1 097 287	2 247 304	3.05
50–54	928 294	962 472	1 890 766	2.56
55–59	634 053	536 967	1 171 020	1.59
60–64	646 359	588 641	1 235 000	1.67
65–69	446 242	359 019	805 261	1.09
70–74	359 897	316 663	676 560	0.92
75–79	203 843	146 333	350 176	0.47
80–84	159 786	127 691	287 477	0.39
85–89	62 001	38 195	100 196	0.14
90–94	38 185	26 357	64 542	0.09
95+	30 709	18 889	49 598	0.07
Age group	Male	Female	Total	Percent
0–14	17 001 904	16 189 119	33 191 023	45.00
15–64	18 914 563	19 311 536	38 226 099	51.83
65+	1 300 663	1 033 147	2 333 810	3.16

Population Estimates by Sex and Age Group (01.VII.2020) (Estimates considering also the results of the 2007 Population Census.):

Age group	Male	Female	Total	%
Total	50 501 054	50 195 689	100 696 744	100
0–4	6 928 657	6 696 036	13 624 693	13.53
5–9	6 556 462	6 386 585	12 943 045	12.85
10–14	5 953 639	5 819 250	11 772 889	11.69
15–19	5 590 667	5 450 660	11 041 324	10.96
20–24	5 047 253	4 902 329	9 949 582	9.88
25–29	4 406 798	4 348 582	8 755 379	8.69
30–34	3 687 268	3 768 246	7 455 512	7.40
35–39	2 990 405	3 135 347	6 125 754	6.08
40–44	2 394 320	2 528 749	4 923 071	4.89
45–49	1 843 822	1 962 667	3 806 489	3.78
50–54	1 472 263	1 548 292	3 020 553	3.00
55–59	1 156 765	1 177 778	2 334 541	2.32
60–64	883 392	899 303	1 782 694	1.77
65–69	639 745	643 776	1 283 523	1.27
70–74	444 339	441 554	885 894	0.88
75–79	276 955	273 976	550 928	0.55
80+	228 308	212 565	440 871	0.44
Age group	Male	Female	Total	Percent
0–14	19 438 758	18 901 871	38 340 629	38.08
15–64	29 472 949	29 721 947	59 194 896	58.79
65+	1 589 347	1 571 871	3 161 218	3.14

=== UN projections ===
Below are the UN's medium variant projections:

UN population projections for Ethiopia (medium variant)
Year	Pop.	±% p.a.
2025	135,472,051	—
2030	147,649,901	+1.74%
2035	164,079,192	+2.13%
2040	180,415,091	+1.92%
2045	196,839,709	+1.76%
2050	213,190,071	+1.61%

== Vital statistics ==
Registration of vital events in Ethiopia is incomplete. The Population Department of the United Nations prepared the following estimates:

Year	Population	Live births	Deaths	Natural change	CBR	CDR	NC	TFR	IMR	Life expectancy (years)
1950	17,710,000	875,000	494,000	381,000	49.4	27.9	21.5	7.35	199.4	36.35
1951	18,101,000	890,000	498,000	392,000	49.1	27.5	21.6	7.30	198.1	36.60
1952	18,497,000	899,000	502,000	397,000	48.6	27.1	21.5	7.20	195.4	36.82
1953	18,892,000	910,000	503,000	407,000	48.1	26.6	21.5	7.12	192.3	37.23
1954	19,292,000	921,000	505,000	416,000	47.7	26.2	21.5	7.05	189.1	37.54
1955	19,704,000	934,000	507,000	428,000	47.4	25.7	21.7	6.99	185.6	37.96
1956	20,128,000	951,000	509,000	442,000	47.2	25.3	21.9	6.95	181.9	38.34
1957	20,499,000	967,000	643,000	324,000	47.2	31.4	15.8	6.92	216.3	32.39
1958	20,817,000	985,000	636,000	349,000	47.3	30.5	16.8	6.90	211.8	32.94
1959	21,227,000	1,007,000	502,000	505,000	47.4	23.6	23.8	6.89	169.9	39.86
1960	21,740,000	1,032,000	508,000	524,000	47.5	23.3	24.1	6.88	165.8	40.33
1961	22,282,000	1,060,000	509,000	551,000	47.6	22.9	24.7	6.88	161.8	41.00
1962	22,852,000	1,090,000	516,000	574,000	47.7	22.6	25.1	6.88	158.0	41.40
1963	23,449,000	1,121,000	520,000	601,000	47.8	22.2	25.6	6.87	154.6	41.96
1964	24,074,000	1,157,000	529,000	628,000	48.0	22.0	26.1	6.87	151.6	42.28
1965	24,728,000	1,193,000	541,000	652,000	48.3	21.9	26.4	6.86	149.6	42.44
1966	25,378,000	1,230,000	607,000	622,000	48.5	23.9	24.5	6.87	160.6	40.15
1967	26,052,000	1,268,000	566,000	702,000	48.7	21.7	26.9	6.88	146.5	42.69
1968	26,779,000	1,308,000	580,000	728,000	48.8	21.7	27.2	6.90	146.2	42.84
1969	27,530,000	1,358,000	599,000	759,000	49.3	21.8	27.5	6.94	146.0	42.83
1970	28,308,000	1,399,000	618,000	781,000	49.4	21.8	27.6	6.98	145.7	42.82
1971	29,100,000	1,442,000	634,000	807,000	49.5	21.8	27.7	7.02	145.4	42.89
1972	29,891,000	1,481,000	687,000	794,000	49.5	23.0	26.6	7.06	152.0	41.55
1973	30,694,000	1,517,000	702,000	815,000	49.4	22.9	26.5	7.09	151.6	41.64
1974	31,489,000	1,561,000	783,000	778,000	49.6	24.9	24.7	7.12	163.2	39.45
1975	32,253,000	1,601,000	803,000	798,000	49.6	24.9	24.7	7.14	163.0	39.36
1976	33,062,000	1,644,000	744,000	900,000	49.7	22.5	27.2	7.19	147.9	41.90
1977	33,695,000	1,694,000	766,000	929,000	49.9	22.5	27.3	7.26	147.6	41.89
1978	34,259,000	1,712,000	774,000	937,000	49.8	22.5	27.3	7.30	147.1	41.90
1979	34,759,000	1,750,000	766,000	985,000	49.8	21.8	28.0	7.31	143.4	42.81
1980	34,945,000	1,764,000	761,000	1,004,000	49.8	21.5	28.3	7.33	141.9	43.22
1981	35,819,000	1,771,000	752,000	1,018,000	49.9	21.2	28.7	7.36	140.4	43.61
1982	37,213,000	1,858,000	782,000	1,076,000	50.0	21.0	28.9	7.37	138.6	43.77
1983	38,235,000	1,917,000	1,084,000	833,000	50.2	28.4	21.8	7.38	180.9	36.04
1984	39,203,000	1,985,000	1,088,000	897,000	50.7	27.8	22.9	7.40	177.5	36.43
1985	40,286,000	2,052,000	1,077,000	974,000	51.0	26.8	24.2	7.38	171.4	37.36
1986	41,455,000	2,111,000	1,090,000	1,021,000	51.0	26.4	24.7	7.36	167.9	37.81
1987	42,852,000	2,168,000	833,000	1,335,000	50.7	19.5	31.2	7.34	126.6	45.44
1988	44,512,000	2,230,000	877,000	1,353,000	50.3	19.8	30.5	7.30	125.1	45.06
1989	46,196,000	2,304,000	911,000	1,394,000	50.0	19.8	30.2	7.27	123.1	45.04
1990	47,878,000	2,389,000	957,000	1,432,000	50.1	20.1	30.0	7.24	122.0	44.56
1991	49,937,000	2,466,000	935,000	1,531,000	49.8	18.9	30.9	7.21	117.6	46.13
1992	52,012,000	2,548,000	950,000	1,598,000	49.1	18.3	30.8	7.16	114.3	46.90
1993	53,792,000	2,618,000	957,000	1,661,000	48.7	17.8	30.9	7.13	111.1	47.39
1994	55,620,000	2,677,000	964,000	1,714,000	48.2	17.3	30.8	7.08	107.7	47.86
1995	57,477,000	2,737,000	970,000	1,767,000	47.6	16.9	30.8	7.01	104.1	48.30
1996	59,348,000	2,811,000	968,000	1,843,000	47.4	16.3	31.1	6.92	100.5	48.92
1997	61,233,000	2,865,000	968,000	1,897,000	46.8	15.8	31.0	6.85	97.1	49.51
1998	63,136,000	2,895,000	973,000	1,921,000	45.8	15.4	30.4	6.75	93.7	49.93
1999	65,078,000	2,946,000	1,011,000	1,935,000	45.3	15.5	29.7	6.65	90.9	49.43
2000	67,032,000	2,984,000	990,000	1,995,000	44.5	14.8	29.7	6.56	87.2	50.54
2001	69,019,000	3,040,000	991,000	2,048,000	44.0	14.4	29.7	6.46	83.9	51.04
2002	71,073,000	3,085,000	992,000	2,092,000	43.4	14.0	29.4	6.37	80.3	51.52
2003	73,169,000	3,096,000	970,000	2,126,000	42.3	13.3	29.0	6.24	76.8	52.53
2004	75,301,000	3,138,000	960,000	2,178,000	41.7	12.7	28.9	6.11	73.1	53.24
2005	77,470,000	3,177,000	948,000	2,230,000	41.0	12.2	28.8	5.97	69.6	54.01
2006	79,691,000	3,207,000	920,000	2,287,000	40.2	11.5	28.7	5.85	66.3	55.15
2007	81,996,000	3,240,000	886,000	2,354,000	39.5	10.8	28.7	5.74	62.8	56.43
2008	84,357,000	3,245,000	856,000	2,389,000	38.5	10.1	28.3	5.57	59.8	57.59
2009	86,756,000	3,235,000	823,000	2,412,000	37.3	9.5	27.8	5.39	57.1	58.80
2010	89,238,000	3,259,000	803,000	2,456,000	36.5	9.0	27.5	5.22	54.4	59.73
2011	91,818,000	3,290,000	782,000	2,508,000	35.8	8.5	27.3	5.05	51.9	60.72
2012	94,451,000	3,289,000	766,000	2,523,000	34.8	8.1	26.7	4.88	49.6	61.54
2013	97,084,000	3,294,000	751,000	2,543,000	33.9	7.7	26.2	4.72	47.4	62.37
2014	99,747,000	3,346,000	748,000	2,598,000	33.6	7.5	26.1	4.61	45.2	62.91
2015	102,472,000	3,425,000	739,000	2,687,000	33.4	7.2	26.2	4.53	43.2	63.65
2016	105,293,000	3,507,000	729,000	2,777,000	33.3	6.9	26.4	4.47	41.4	64.39
2017	108,198,000	3,577,000	732,000	2,844,000	33.1	6.8	26.3	4.39	39.6	64.84
2018	111,129,000	3,668,000	730,000	2,937,000	33.0	6.6	26.4	4.34	38.0	65.41
2019	114,176,000	3,883,000	750,000	3,122,000	33.5	6.5	27.0	4.35	37.6	65.7
2020	117,298,000	3,961,000	761,000	3,239,000	33.3	6.4	27.2	4.27	36.3	66.0
2021	120,537,000	4,015,000	811,000	3,203,000	32.9	6.6	26.2	4.18	35.1	65.3
2022	123,740,000	4,064,000	767,000	3,288,000	32.4	6.1	26.2	4.08	34.0	66.9
2023	127,028,000	4,106,000	767,000	3,327,000	31.9	6.0	25.9	3.99	33.0	67.3
2024					31.5	5.9	25.6	3.91		
2025					30.8	5.8	25.0	3.81		
2026										

CBR = crude birth rate (per 1,000); CDR = crude death rate (per 1,000); NC = natural change (per 1,000); IMR = infant mortality rate per 1,000 births; TFR = total fertility rate (number of children per woman); IMR = infant mortality rate per 1,000 births

Source: UN World Population Prospects

View source data.
View source data.
View source data.
View source data.

=== Census data on fertility ===
As per 2007 Population and Housing Census of Ethiopia

Region	Urban TFR	Rural TFR	Total TFR (U+R)
Ethiopia (Country Total)	2.220	4.650	4.160
Tigray Region	2.915	4.905	4.440
Affar Region	2.440	2.000	2.075
Amhara Region	2.135	4.540	4.175
Oromia Region	2.635	5.235	4.845
Somali Region	2.175	1.985	2.010
Benishangul – Gumuz Region	3.005	4.800	4.520
S.N.N.P Region	2.750	4.715	4.495
Gambella Region	2.725	2.930	2.885
Harari Region	1.725	4.725	2.885
Addis Ababa City Administration	1.485	-	1.485
Dira Dawa City Administration	2.155	5.455	2.985
Region 17	3.210	2.585	2.845

Years	1925	1926	1927	1928	1929
Total Fertility Rate in Ethiopia	7.17	7.18	7.18	7.19	7.20

Years	1930	1931	1932	1933	1934	1935	1936	1937	1938	1939
Total Fertility Rate in Ethiopia	7.21	7.21	7.22	7.23	7.23	7.24	7.25	7.26	7.26	7.27

Years	1940	1941	1942	1943	1944	1945	1946	1947	1948	1949
Total Fertility Rate in Ethiopia	7.28	7.29	7.29	7.30	7.31	7.31	7.32	7.33	7.34	7.34

=== Demographic and health surveys ===
Crude birth rate (CBR), total fertility rate (TFR) and wanted fertility rate (WFR):

Year	Crude birth rate (CBR)			Total fertility rate (TFR)			Wanted fertility rate (WFR)		
Year	total	urban	rural	total	urban	rural	total	urban	rural
2000	41.3	30.7	42.9	5.9	3.3	6.4	4.9	2.7	5.4
2005	35.7	23.4	37.3	5.4	2.4	6.0	4.0	1.8	4.5
2011	34.5	26.4	36.2	4.8	2.6	5.5	3.8		
2016	31.8	23.9	33.2	4.6	2.3	5.2	3.6	2.1	4.0
2019	26.5	24.6	27.2	4.1	3.2	4.5			
2024-25	30.1	31.5	29.6	4.0	3.2	4.5	3.6	2.9	3.9

Fertility data as of 2016 (DHS Program):

Region	Total fertility rate	Percentage of women age 15–49 currently pregnant	Mean number of children ever born to women age 40–49
Tigray	4.7	5.0	6.1
Afar	5.5	9.5	6.5
Amhara	3.7	5.9	6.2
Oromiya	5.4	8.3	6.7
Somali	7.2	12.9	7.4
Benishangul-Gumuz	4.4	7.3	6.7
SNNPR	4.4	8.0	6.9
Gambela	3.5	5.9	4.9
Harari	4.1	9.2	4.3
Addis Ababa	1.8	2.6	2.6
Dire Dawa	3.1	5.5	5.2

== Ethnic groups ==
Ethnic groups in Ethiopia (2007 census)
Ethnic group	percent
Oromo	34.5%
Amhara	26.9%
Somali	6.2%
Tigray	6.1%
Sidama	4.0%
Gurage	2.5%
Welayta	2.3%
Hadiya	1.7%
Afar	1.7%
Gamo	1.5%
others	12.6%

Ethiopia's population is highly diverse, containing over 80 different ethnic groups, the four largest of which are the Oromo, Amhara, Somali and Tigrayans. According to the Ethiopian national census of 2007, the Oromo are the largest ethnic group in Ethiopia, at 34.4% of the nation's population. The Amhara represent 27.0% of the country's inhabitants, while Somalis and Tigrayans represent 6.2% and 6.1% of the population respectively. Other prominent ethnic groups are as follows: Sidama 4.0%, Gurage 2.5%, Welayta 2.3%, Afar 1.7%, Hadiya 1.7%, Gamo 1.5% and Others 12.6%.

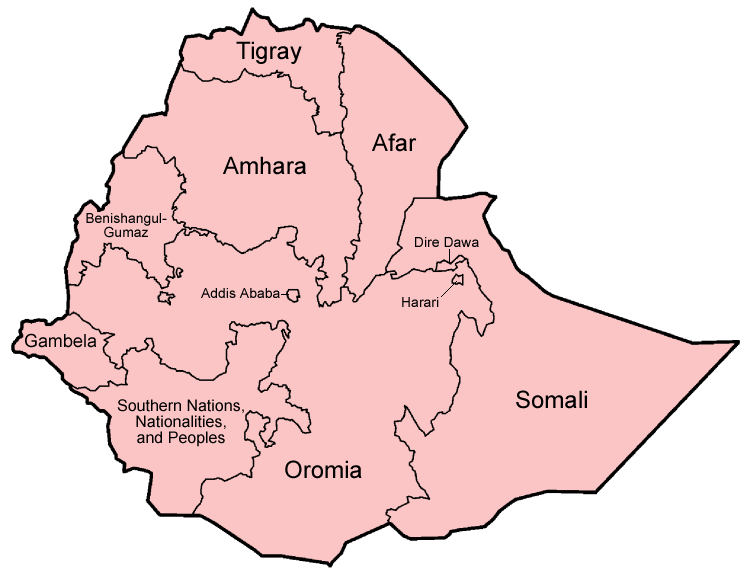
Afroasiatic-speaking communities make up the majority of the population. Among these, Semitic speakers often collectively refer to themselves as the Habesha people. The Arabic form of this term (al-Ḥabasha) is the etymological basis of "Abyssinia", the former name of Ethiopia in English and other European languages. Additionally, Nilo-Saharan-speaking ethnic minorities inhabit the southern regions of the country, particularly in areas of the Gambela Region which borders South Sudan. The largest ethnic groups among these include the Nuer and Anuak. The Southern Nations, Nationalities, and Peoples' Region, being an amalgam of the main homelands of numerous ethnicities, contains over 56 indigenous ethnic groups.

== Languages ==
According to the bibliographic database Glottolog, there are 109 languages spoken in Ethiopia; meanwhile, Ethnologue lists 90 individual languages spoken in the country. Most people in the country speak Afroasiatic languages of the Cushitic or Semitic branches, including the Oromo language, Somali, Amharic, and Tigrinya. Together, these four groups make up about three-quarters of Ethiopia's population. Other Afroasiatic languages with a significant number of speakers include the Omotic Wolayttattuwa, the Cushitic Sidamo, Afar, Hadiyya and Agaw languages, as well as the Semitic Gurage languages, Harari, Silt'e, and Argobba languages. Arabic, which also belongs to the Afroasiatic family, is likewise spoken in some areas.

The principal Semitic language of the north-west and centre of the country is Amharic, which is the language of the Amhara Region. Moreover, Amharic is also one of the official working languages of Ethiopia.

Oromo serves as one of the official working languages of Ethiopia and is also the working language of several of the states within the Ethiopian federal system including Oromia, Harar and Dire Dawa regional states and of the Oromia Zone in the Amhara Region.

== Religion ==
Religion in Ethiopia in 2015 by ARDA
Ethiopian Orthodox	42.1%
Islam	34.6%
Protestant	20.8%
Traditional faiths	1.4%
Roman Catholic	0.6%
Other and No religion	0.1%

Various religions are adhered to in Ethiopia. Most Christians live in the Ethiopian Highlands, whereas Muslims mainly inhabit the lowlands. Adherents of traditional faiths are primarily concentrated in the southern regions.

According to the Ethiopian Central Statistical Agency (2007 census), the national religious composition is Ethiopian Orthodox 43.5%, Protestantism 18.6%, Roman Catholicism 0.7%, Islam 33.9%, traditional 2.6%, and others 0.6%.

== See also ==
- Habesha peoples
- Urbanization in Ethiopia
