= List of rivers of Sudan =

This is a list of streams and rivers in Sudan, arranged geographically by drainage basin. There is an alphabetic list at the end of this article.

== Flowing into the Mediterranean ==
- Nile
  - Atbara River
    - Mareb River (or Gash River) (only reaches the Atbara in times of flood)
    - Tekezé River (or Setit)
    - Angereb River (or Greater Angereb River)
  - Blue Nile
    - Rahad River
    - Dinder River
  - White Nile
    - Adar River
      - Yabus River
    - Bahr el Ghazal
      - Jur River
      - Bahr al-Arab
        - Adda River
        - Umbelasha River
        - Lol River
  - Sobat River :
    - Baro River
    - Pibor River :
      - Akobo River

== Flowing into the Red Sea ==
- Barka River

== Flowing into endorheic basins ==
=== Libyan Desert ===
- Wadi Howar (remnant of the Yellow Nile, an ancient tributary of the Nile)

=== Lake Kundi ===
- Ibrah River

== Alphabetical list ==
=== A to M ===
- Adda River, Sudan - Angereb River - Atbarah River
- Bahr al-Arab - Barka River
- Dinder River
- Geni River
- Ibrah River
- Mareb River (Gash River)

=== N to Z ===
- Nile River
- Rahad River
- Tekezé River - Tiwal River
- Umbelasha River
- Wadi Howar - White Nile
- Yabus River

== See also ==
- List of rivers of South Sudan
