= Balagas River =

Balagas Beleghas

Location
- Country: Ethiopia

Physical characteristics
- Mouth
  - coordinates: 12.742767°N 38.469106°E

Basin features
- Progression: Tekezé→ Atbarah→ Nile→ Mediterranean Sea

The Balagas, also known as the Beleghas, is a river of northern Ethiopia. A tributary of the Tekezé, it is a part of the Nile basin.

== See also ==
- Rivers of Ethiopia
