= Ataba River =

River in Ethiopia

Location
- Country: Ethiopia

Physical characteristics
- Source
  - coordinates: 13°20′44.506″N 38°16′5.232″E
- Mouth: Tekezé River
  - coordinates: 13°39′17.305″N 38°34′20.309″E
- Length: 28 km (17 mi)

Basin features
- Progression: Tekezé→Atbarah→Nile→Mediterranean Sea
- River system: Nile Basin

Ataba River is a river of northern Ethiopia and a tributary of the Tekezé River.

== See also ==
- Rivers of Ethiopia
