= Angereb River =

River in Ethiopia and Sudan

Angereb Bahr as-Salam
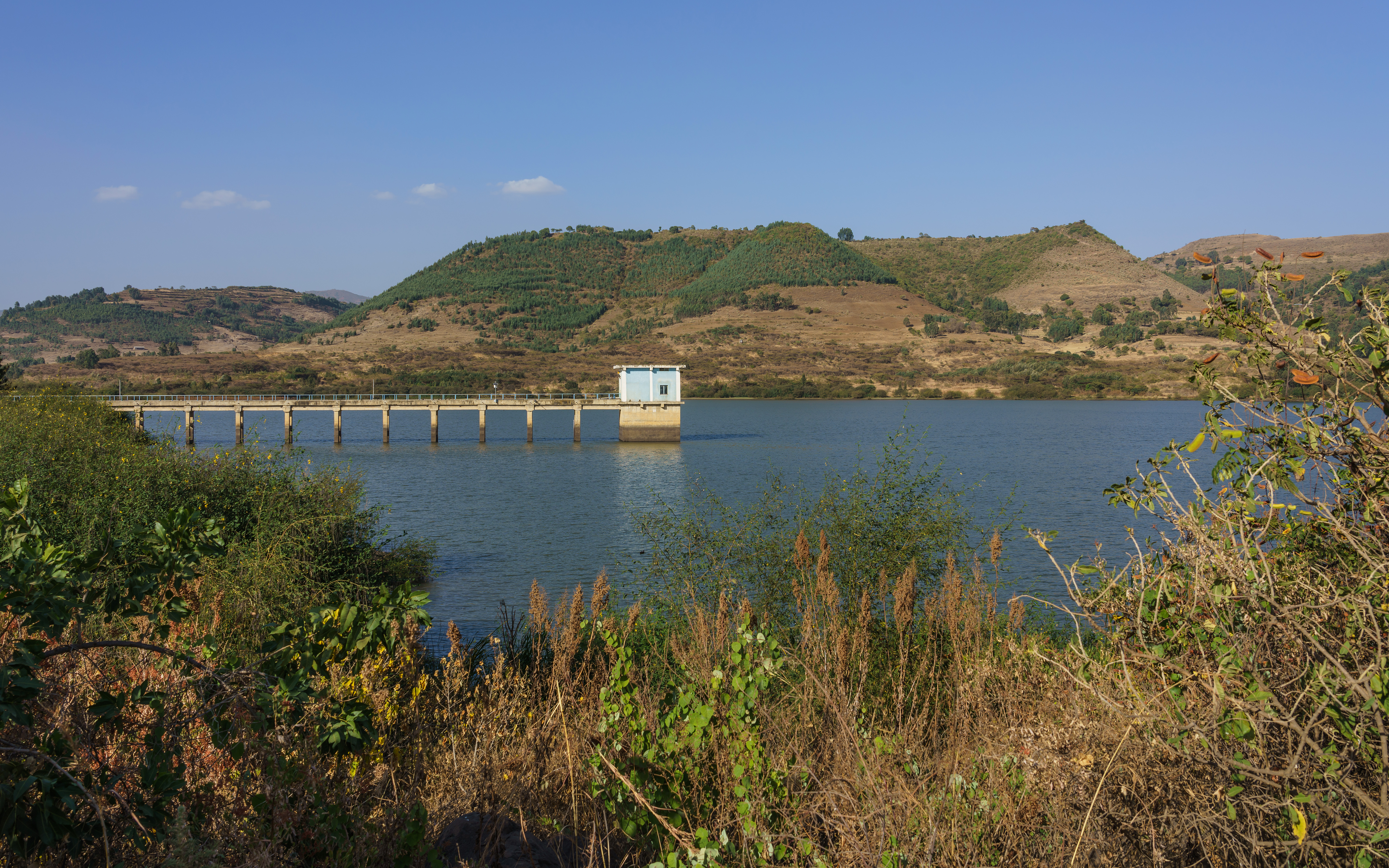
- Angereb Reservoir at Gondar

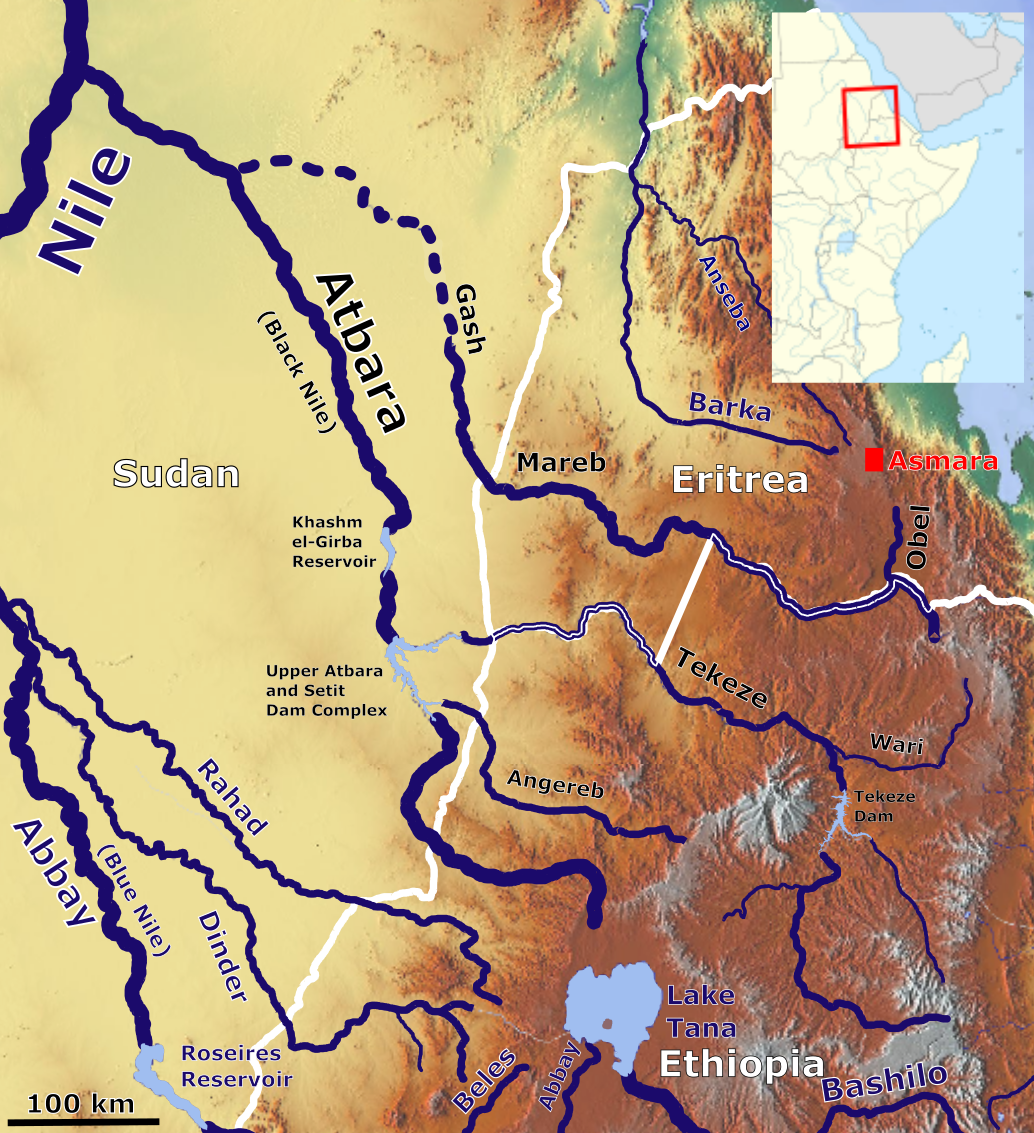
- Map showing the Atbara basin, with the Angereb River (Center)

Location
- Country: Ethiopia, Sudan

Physical characteristics
- Mouth: Atbarah River
  - coordinates: 13°52′45.8″N 36°6′24.8″E
- Length: 220 km (140 mi)
- Basin size: 14,400 km^{2} (5,600 sq mi)

Basin features
- Progression: Atbarah→ Nile→ Mediterranean Sea
- River system: Nile Basin

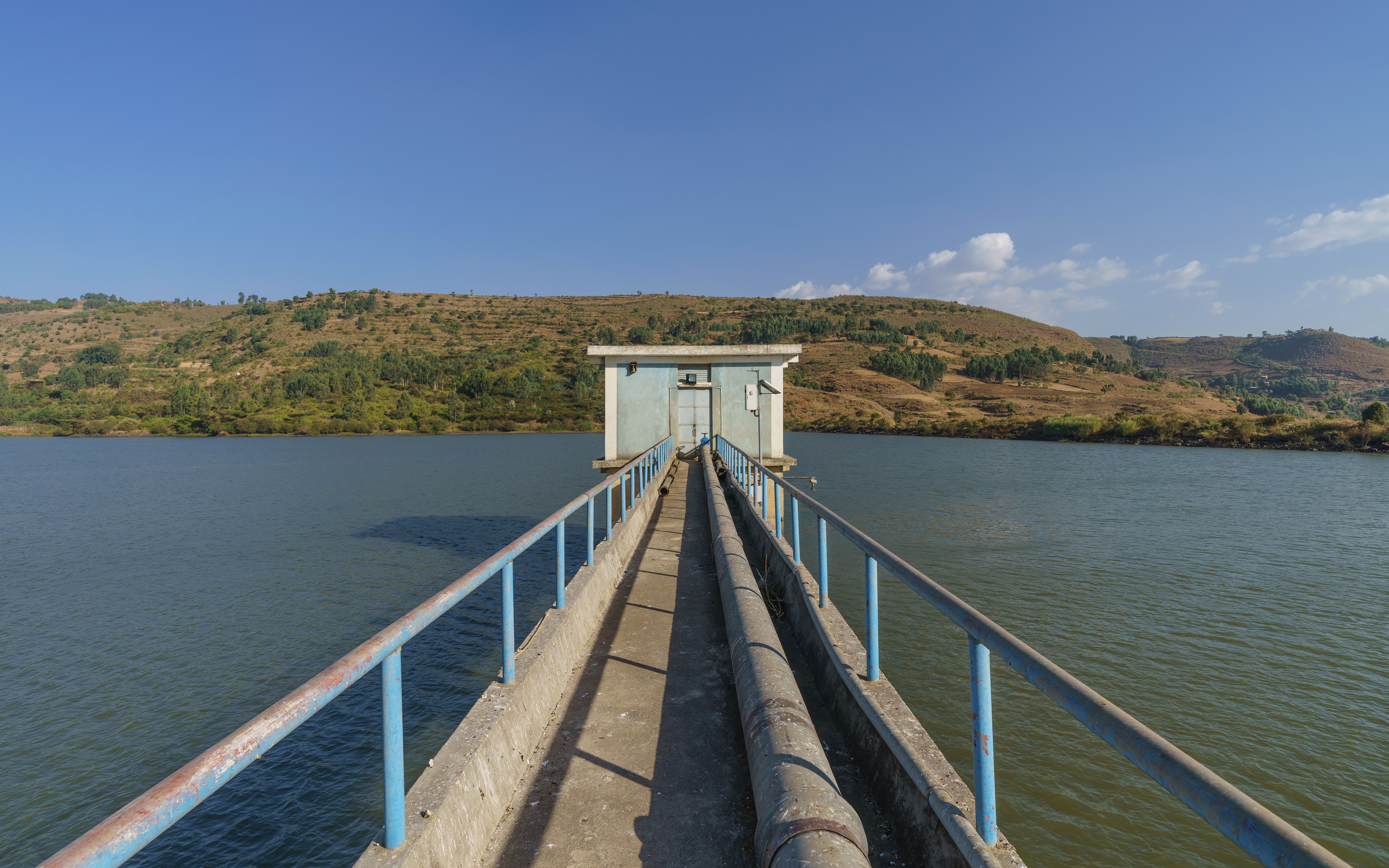
Pump house of Angereb Reservoir

The Angereb also known as the Bahr as-Salam is a river of Ethiopia and eastern Sudan, and one of the sources of the Nile. It rises near Daqwa, north of the city of Gondar in the Amhara Region, flowing west to join the Atbarah River. The historic district of Armachiho is located along its course.

The Angereb dam, commissioned in 1997, was intended to address the town's potable water supply problem for 25 years. The Angereb reservoir and two boreholes are the main sources of water for the town, with a combined average production capacity of 8,298 m^{3}/day.

== See also ==
- Lesser Angereb
- List of rivers of Ethiopia
- List of rivers of Sudan
