= Zarima River =

River in Ethiopia

- Mouth of the Zarima River

Location
- Country: Ethiopia

Physical characteristics
- Mouth: Tekezé River
  - coordinates: 13°51′35″N 37°46′10″E

Basin features
- Progression: Tekezé→Atbarah→Nile→Mediterranean Sea
- River system: Tekezé River

Zarima River is a river of Ethiopia and tributary of the Tekezé River. The Wolkayite Irrigation Project is based on a tributary of the Zarima River known as the Dukoko River.

== See also ==
- List of rivers of Ethiopia
