= Chelbi Wildlife Reserve =

National park in Ethiopia

- IUCN category IV (habitat/species management area)
- Location within Ethiopia
- Location: Southern Nations, Nationalities, and Peoples' Region, Ethiopia
- Coordinates: 4°56′N 36°52′E
- Area: 4,212 km^{2} (1,626 sq mi)
- Established: 1973
- Governing body: Office of Culture Sport and Tourism (OCST) of Southern Nations, Nationalities, and Peoples' Region

Chelbi Wildlife Reserve or Stephanie Wildlife Reserve is a protected area in Ethiopia's Southern Nations, Nationalities, and Peoples' Region.

The reserve covers an area of 4212 km^{2} surrounding Lake Chew Bahir, aka Lake Chelbi, and portions of the Woito and Segen River watersheds, which empty into the lake.

The reserve was established in 1973, and is also known as Chalbi, Chew Bahir, or Stephanie Wildlife Reserve. It is bounded on the south by the Kenyan border, on the east by Borana National Park, and on the west by the Murle (or Murulle) Controlled Hunting Area.

The reserve is in the Somali Acacia–Commiphora bushlands and thickets ecoregion, and protects a population of Grevy’s zebra (Equus grevyi).
