= Tana Qirqos =

Island in Lake Tana, Ethiopia

Tana Qirqos (variantly spelled Tana Kirkos; also called Tana Chirqos or Tana Chirkos, etc.; Geʽez: ጣና ቂርቆስ ṭānā qirqos, ጣና ጪርቆስ ṭānā č̣irqos) is an island in the eastern part of Lake Tana in Ethiopia, near the mouth of the Gumara River, having a latitude and longitude of 11°51′49″N 37°29′27″E. The island is named after Saint Cyricus.

It is considered a holy island, and only monks of the Ethiopian Church live there. The monks believe that the island was once the resting place of the Ark of the Covenant. According to tradition, the Ark was placed there by Emperor Ezana, the first Ethiopian sovereign to convert to Christianity, and it remained on the island until it was transported to Mary of Zion church in Axum.

Graham Hancock has speculated that the Ark was carried from Elephantine by the Jewish garrison on the island, around the 5th century BC. However, some specialists consider the theory unfounded.

When R.E. Cheesman visited Tana Qirqos in 1933, he found a large stratum of rock at the northern end of the island, which looked "like a huge wall of masonry" 400 or 500 yards long and standing about 100 feet high. He recorded that the formation "has been identified as olivine-bearing basalt," and that "in all probability the island gives its name to the lake."
