= Qortem Zer'a =

River in the Tembien highlands of Ethiopia

Qortem Zer’a
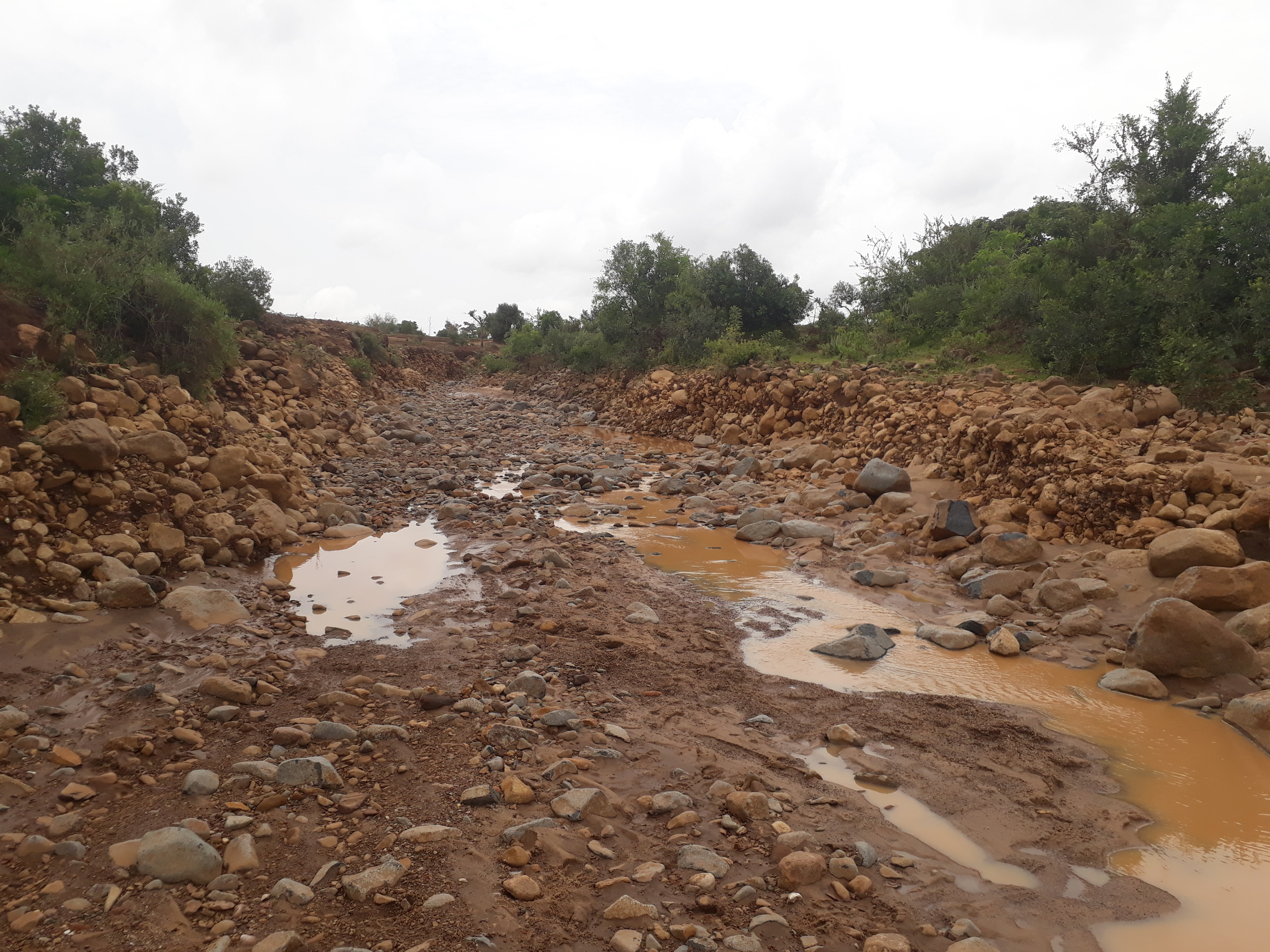
- The Qortem Zer’a River

- Qortem Zer’a River in Dogu’a Tembien

Location
- Country: Ethiopia
- Region: Tigray Region
- Districts (woreda): Dogu’a Tembien and Kola Tembien

Physical characteristics
- Source: May Baha
  - location: Degol Woyane municipality
  - elevation: 2,230 m (7,320 ft)
- Mouth: Weri’i River
  - location: Kola Tembien
  - coordinates: 13.70222°N 38.6438°E
- Length: 15.4 km (9.6 mi)
- Width
  - average: 15 m (49 ft)

Basin features
- Progression: Wari→Tekezé→Atbarah→Nile→Mediterranean Sea
- River system: Seasonal river
- Landmarks: Amanuel rock church in May Baha, Imba K’ernale Mt.
- Bridges: Getski Melesiley on Abiy Addi-Werqamba road
- Topography: Sharp mountains and plains

The Qortem Zer’a is a river of the Nile basin. Rising in the mountains of Dogu’a Tembien in northern Ethiopia, it flows westward to empty finally in the Weri’i and Tekezé River.

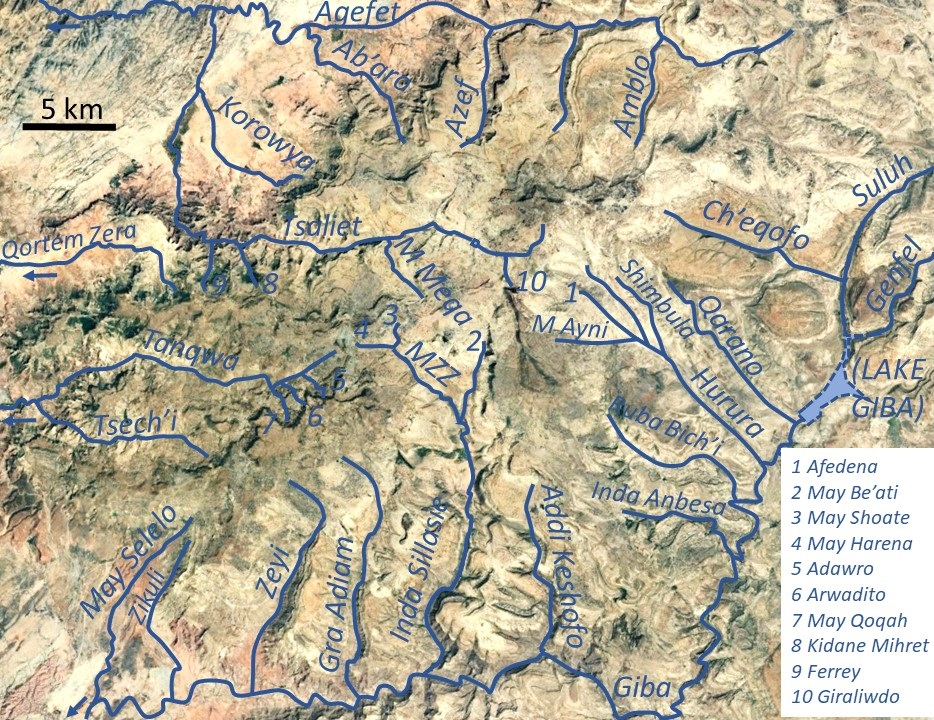
The river in the radial drainage network of Dogu’a Tembien

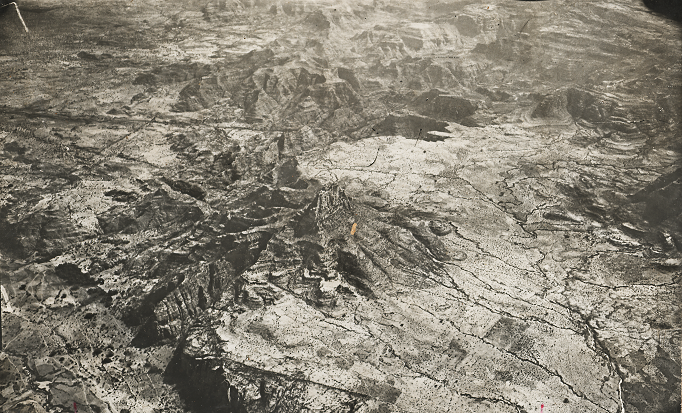
1936 high-oblique photo over Qortem Zer'a catchment

== Characteristics ==
It is an ephemeral river, mostly meandering in its alluvial plain, with an average slope gradient of 34 metres per kilometre.

== Flash floods and flood buffering ==
Runoff mostly happens in the form of high runoff discharge events that occur in a very short period (called flash floods). These are related to the steep topography, often little vegetation cover and intense convective rainfall. The peaks of such flash floods have often a 50 to 100 times larger discharge than the preceding baseflow. The magnitude of floods in this river has, however, been decreased due to interventions in the catchment. Physical conservation structures such as stone bunds and check dams intercept runoff. On many steep slopes, exclosures have been established; the dense vegetation largely contributes to enhanced infiltration, less flooding and better baseflow.

== Irrigated agriculture ==
Besides springs and reservoirs, irrigation is strongly dependent on the river's baseflow. Such irrigated agriculture is important in meeting the demands for food security and poverty reduction. Irrigated lands are established in the alluvial plain along the river, particularly west of Getski Melesiley.

== Transhumance towards the gorge ==
Transhumance takes place in the summer rainy season, when the lands near the villages in the uplands and the lowlands are occupied by crops. Young shepherds will take the village cattle to the slopes at the river headwaters.

== Boulders and pebbles in the river bed ==
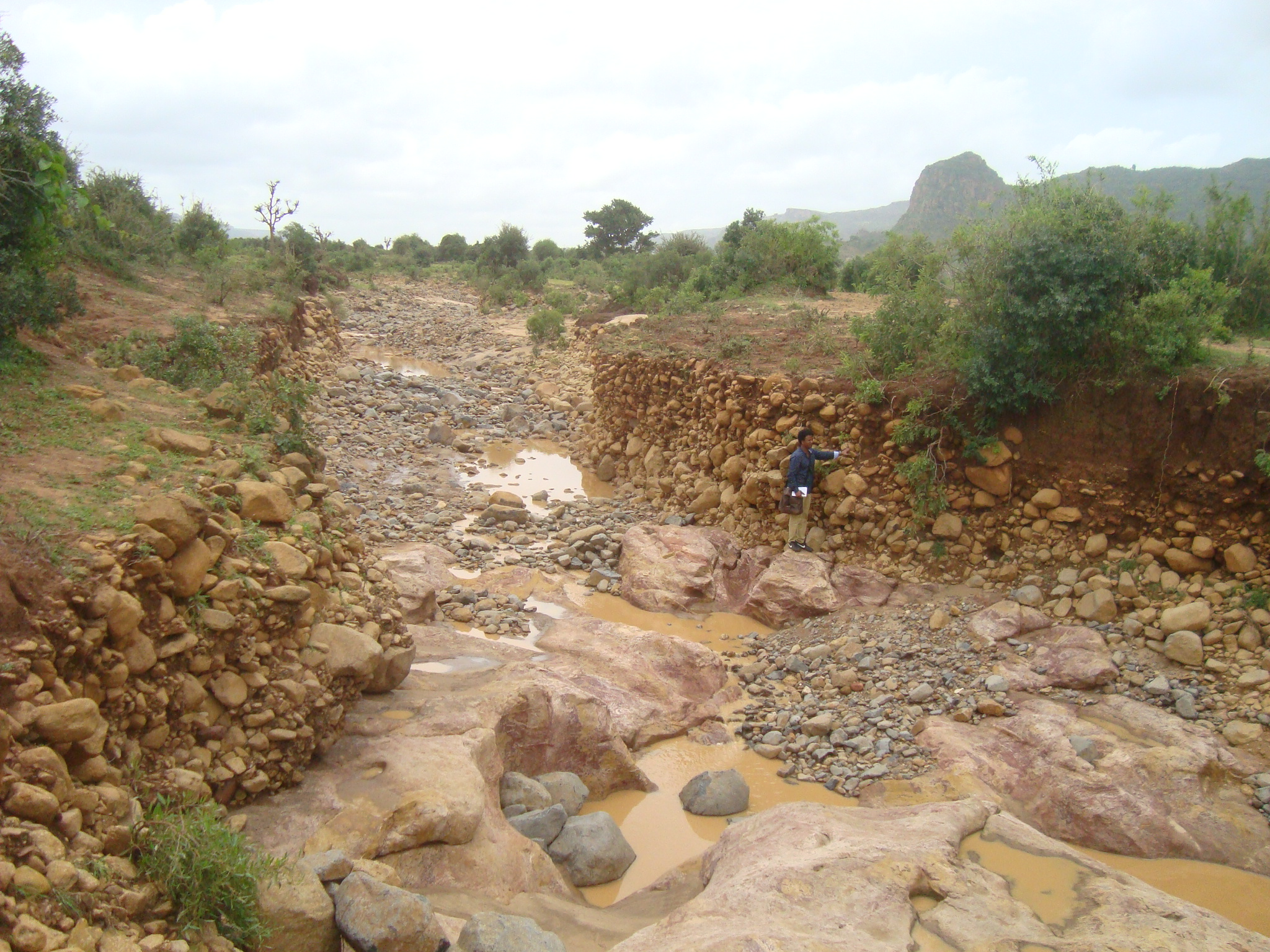
Debris cone along Qortem Zer’a

Boulders and pebbles encountered in the river bed can originate from any location higher up in the basin. In the uppermost stretches of the river, only rock fragments of the upper lithological units will be present in the river bed, whereas more downstream one may find a more comprehensive mix of all lithologies crossed by the river. From upstream to downstream, the following lithological units occur in the catchment.

- Upper basalt
- Interbedded lacustrine deposits
- Lower basalt
- Amba Aradam Formation
- Adigrat Sandstone
- Edaga Arbi Glacials

== From upper to lower Tembien ==
During its course, this river passes through two woredas. On the various parts:

- The headwaters are in Dogu’a Tembien
- Most of the lower plain is in Kola Tembien

== Trekking along the river ==
Trekking routes have been established across and along this river. The tracks are not marked on the ground but can be followed using downloaded .GPX files.

- Trek 5, along upper part of the river
- Trek S3, along the lower part, potentially down to Tekezé River

In the rainy season, flash floods may occur and it is advised not to follow the river bed. In the lower part, it may be impossible to cross the river in the rainy season.

== Gallery ==
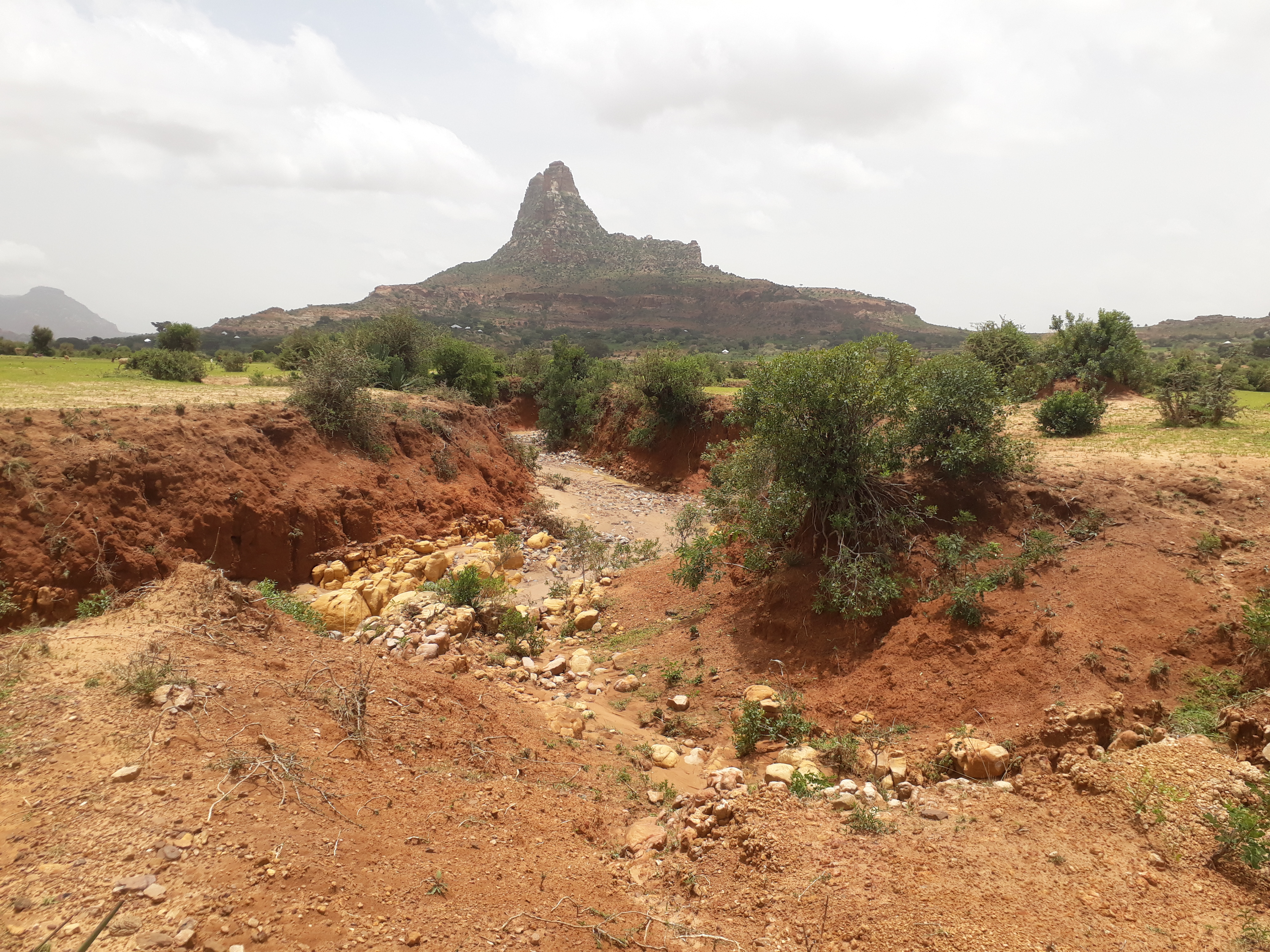
Qortem Zer’a near Imba K’ernale mountain

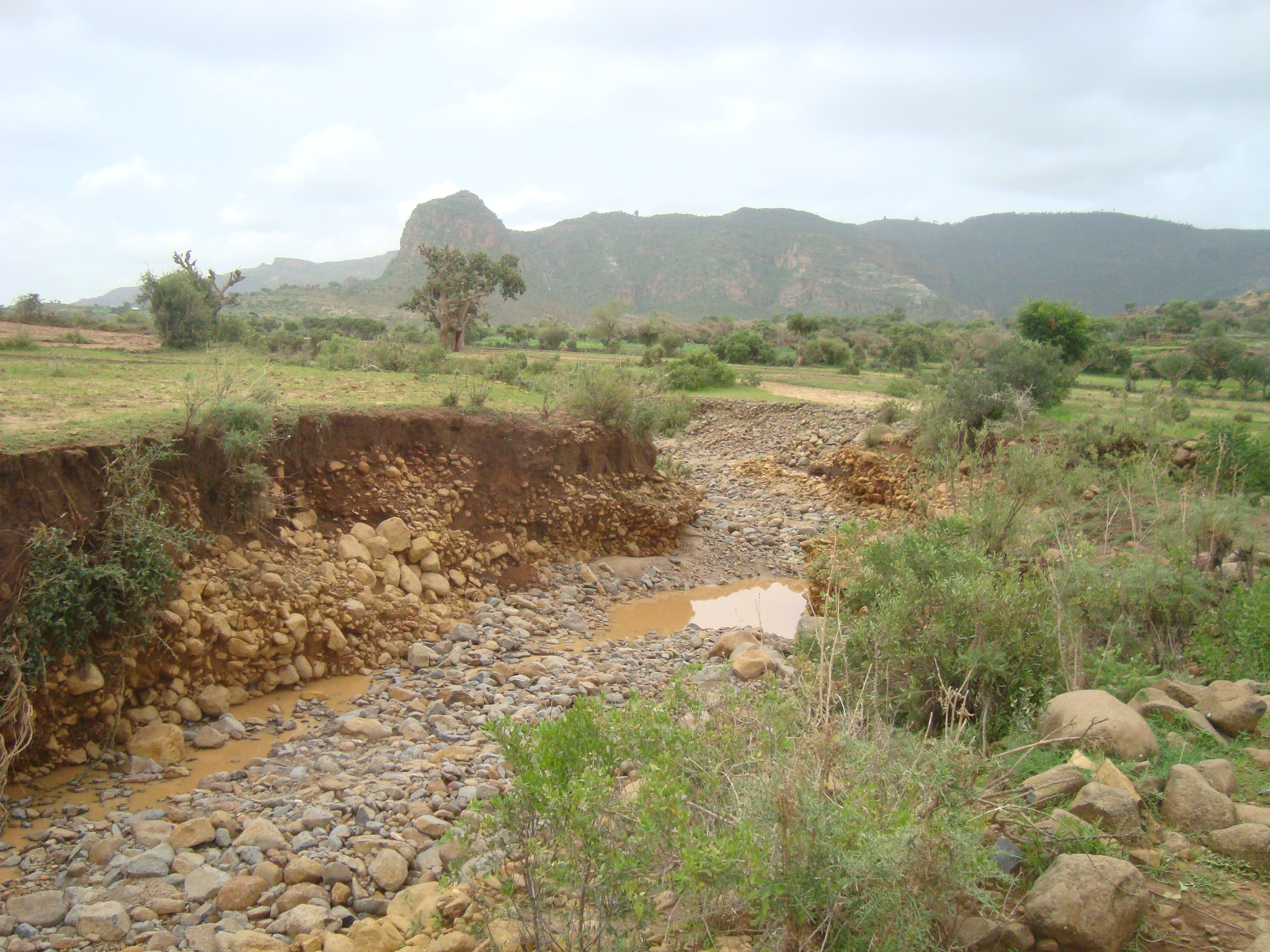
View over Qortem Zer’a towards May Baha

== See also ==
- List of Ethiopian rivers
