= Mofar River =

River in central Ethiopia

Coordinates: 10°01′N 39°18′E

Mofar River is a west-flowing river of central Ethiopia, and part of the watershed of the Abay. Part of its course is in a deep canyon.

== See also ==
- List of rivers of Ethiopia
