= Dechatu River =

River in Ethiopia

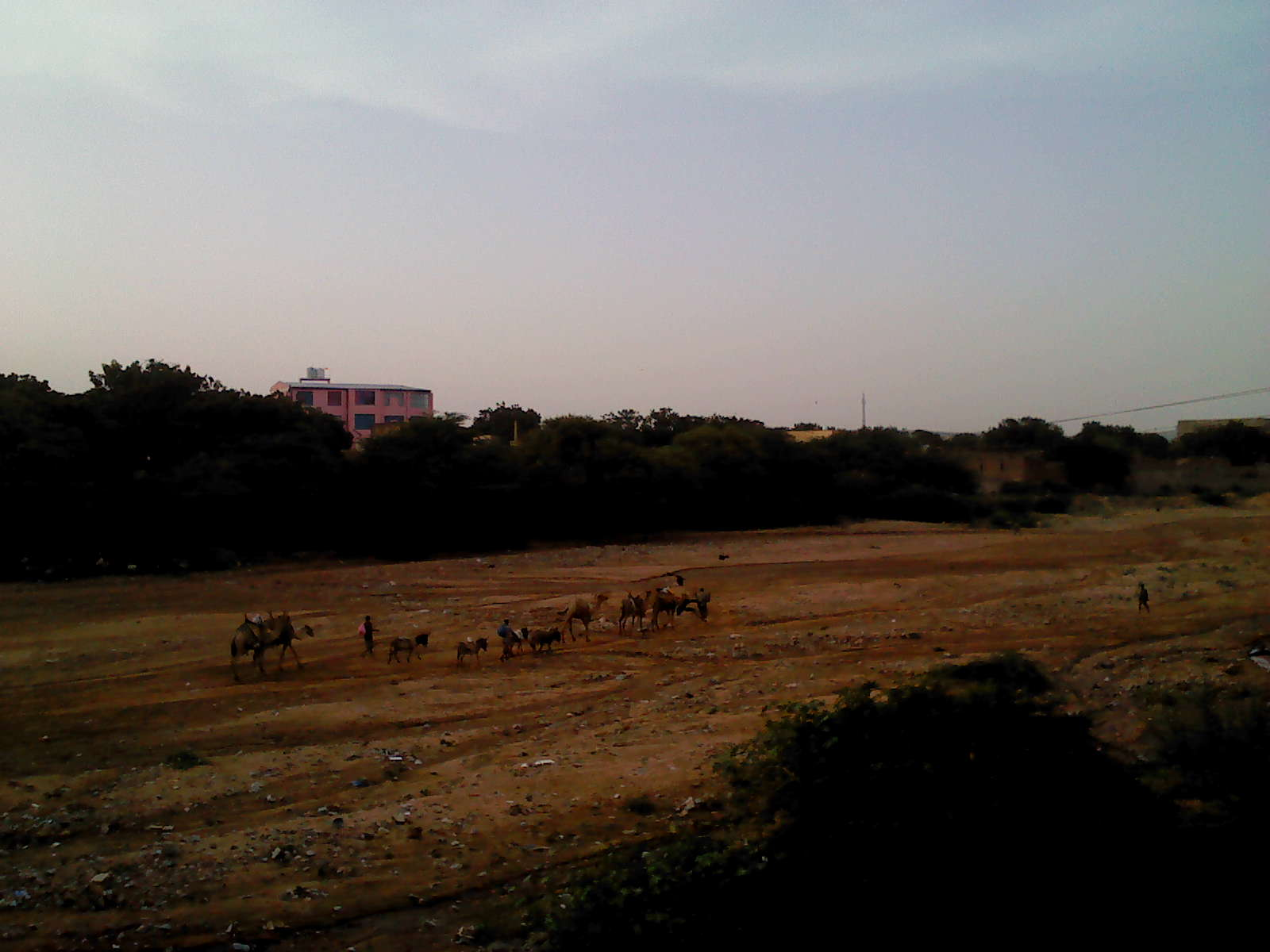

Location
- Country: Ethiopia

Physical characteristics
- Source: Ahmar Mountains
  - coordinates: 9°27′59″N 41°47′13″E
  - elevation: 2,085 m (6,841 ft)
- Mouth: Lake Abbe (river bed)
  - coordinates: 11°6′42″N 41°43′3″E
  - elevation: 247 m (810 ft)
- Length: 359 km (223 mi)
- Basin size: 21,165 km^{2} (8,172 sq mi)
- Discharge
  - location: Mouth
  - average: 82.6 m^{3}/s (2,920 cu ft/s)
  - minimum: 8.27 m^{3}/s (292 cu ft/s)
  - maximum: 211 m^{3}/s (7,500 cu ft/s)

Basin features
- River system: Lake Abbe Basin
- Cities: Dire Dawa

The Dechatu River is a river of eastern Ethiopia. It rises in the Ahmar Mountains to flow north through the second largest city in the country, Dire Dawa, towards the Awash River. The river appears to lose itself in the Cantur Plain (Buren Meda) north of Dire Dawa, while its river bed weaves through mountains to reach Lake Abbe in a small fan delta.

== Floods ==
The river floods periodically during the June-to-September rainy season. In 2005 around 200 people were killed by floodwaters and crocodiles. A flood in August 2006 killed at least 300, including 200 in the city of Dire Dawa. The city suffered extensive damage and thousands of its inhabitants were displaced. Communications infrastructure was damaged and the main road to the capital Addis Ababa was cut off. On 24 April 2020, as a result of heavy rain in the upland catchment, the flooded Dechatu river killed four people and left two residents with heavy injuries, washing away more than thirty houses.

== See also ==
- List of Ethiopian rivers
