= Mantsa River =

River in Ethiopia

The Mantsa River is a river of southern Ethiopia. It is a south-flowing tributary of the Omo River, entering it on the right bank at 6°42′28″N 36°55′52″E.

== See also ==
- List of rivers of Ethiopia
