= Weito River =

River in SNNPR, Ethiopia

The Weito River (also known as the Weyt’o Wenz, Tullaya River) is a river in the Southern Nations, Nationalities, and Peoples' Region of Ethiopia. It rises in the Guge Mountains, flowing south into Lake Chew Bahir at latitude and longitude 4°49′58″N 36°58′54″E.

The Weito defines the boundary between the Bena Tsemay woreda and the Konso special woreda, as well as part of the boundary between the Southern Nations, Nationalities, and Peoples' Region and the Oromia Region. The river is subject to seasonal flooding.

Tributaries include the Sagan River and the Segen River.

== See also ==
- List of rivers of Ethiopia
