= Segen River =

River in Ethiopia

The Segen is a river that arises from Delo Mountain, central Amarro, Ethiopia. The river flows to the east, then to the north and to the west and last to the south to join the Weito River. The Segen and the Weito then flow into Lake Chew Bahir. On the western side of Amarro horst the valley through which the river flows is called Segen Valley.

The Segen River valley is home to five neighboring ethic groups, the Konso, Dirashe, Burji, Amaro and Alle.

The Segen river comprises part of the Konso - Segen important bird area, which is home to 26 qualifying species.

== See also ==
- Ethnic violence in Konso
- Konso Zone
