= Magech River =

River in Ethiopia

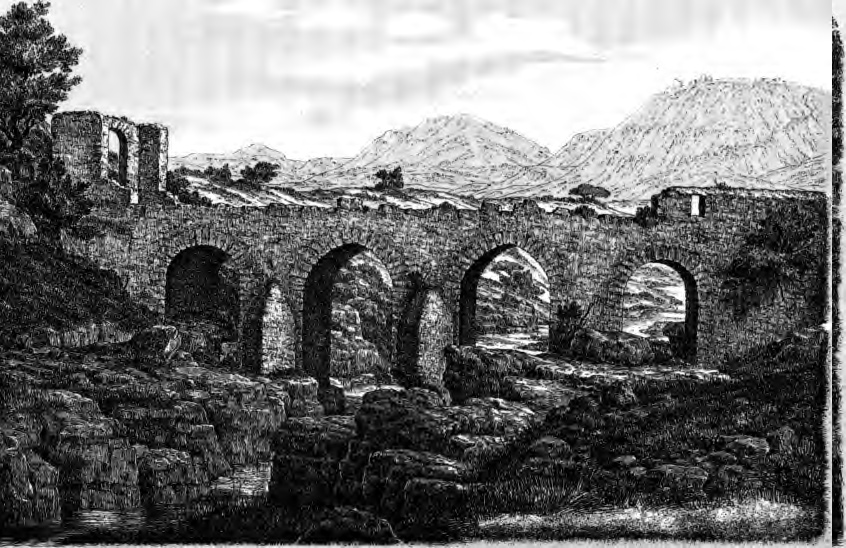
- One of the old bridges over the Magech built during the reign of Fasilides

- Map of Lake Tana and the rivers feeding it
- Native name: መገጭ (Amharic)

Location
- Country: Ethiopia
- Region: Amhara
- Zone: North Gondar

Physical characteristics
- Source
  - location: North of Gondar
  - coordinates: 12°16′39.4″N 37°24′21.6″E
  - elevation: 2,455 m (8,054 ft)
- Mouth: Lake Tana
  - location: Southeast of Weyna
  - coordinates: 12°16′12.882″N 37°24′42.066″E
  - elevation: 1,786 m (5,860 ft)
- Length: 75 km (47 mi)
- Basin size: 685 km^{2} (264 sq mi)

Basin features
- Progression: Lake Tana → Blue Nile → Nile → Mediterranean Sea
- River system: Nile Basin
- Population: 505,000
- Tributaries
  - right: Lesser Angereb

The Magech River (Amharic: መገጭ) is a river of Ethiopia. It rises just off the city of Gondar, and flows south into Lake Tana in two branches. Its tributaries include the Dmaza, the Lesser Angereb, and the Ahyamezoriya.

The Magech is known for two bridges over it, which were built either by Portuguese artisans or during the reign of Fasilides: one of these bridges has five arches, and the other three arches upstream near Gondar.

On 21 June 2007, the World Bank announced that it had approved an International Development Association credit of US$100 million for an Irrigation and Drainage project covering the Magech and Reb rivers, as part of the Nile Basin Initiative. With the goal of increasing irrigated agricultural output, this proposed project will develop incrementally a total area of 20,000 hectares.

== See also ==
- List of rivers of Ethiopia
