= Dembi River =

River in Ethiopia

Location
- Country: Ethiopia
- Regional State: South West Ethiopia Peoples' Region
- Zone: Bench Sheko
- District: Debub Bench

Physical characteristics
- Source
  - location: Mizan Teferi
  - coordinates: 6°52′34″N 35°30′40″E
  - elevation: 1,561 m (5,121 ft)
- Mouth: Gilo River
  - coordinates: 6.990784°N 35.480363°E
  - elevation: 1,081 m (3,547 ft)
- Length: 17 km (11 mi)
- Basin size: 87 km^{2} (34 sq mi)
- Discharge
  - average: 0.634 m^{3}/s (22.4 cu ft/s)
  - minimum: 0.115 m^{3}/s (4.1 cu ft/s)
  - maximum: 1.61 m^{3}/s (57 cu ft/s)

Basin features
- Progression: Gilo → Pibor → Sobat → White Nile → Nile → Mediterranean Sea
- River system: Nile Basin
- Population: 66,700
- Waterbodies: Dembi Reservoir

The Dembi is a river of southwestern Ethiopia, in the Debub Bench district.

== See also ==
- List of rivers of Ethiopia
