= Lagabora River =

Location
- Country: Ethiopia

Lagabora River is a river of south-central Ethiopia.

== See also ==
- List of rivers of Ethiopia
