= Kibish River =

River at the crossroad of South Sudan – Ethiopia – Kenya border

- Location of mouth in Ehtiopia

Location
- Countries: Kenya, Ethiopia, South Sudan

Physical characteristics
- Source: Ethiopian Highlands
  - location: Mount Maji
  - coordinates: 6°8′30″N 35°35′14″E
  - elevation: 2,256 m (7,402 ft)
- Mouth: Lake Turkana (sometimes)
  - coordinates: 4°37′42″N 35°58′25″E
  - elevation: 370 m (1,210 ft)
- Length: 260 km (162 mi)
- Basin size: 12,046 km^{2} (4,651 sq mi)
- Discharge
  - location: Mouth
  - average: 24.56 m^{3}/s (867.3 cu ft/s)
  - minimum: 12.64 m^{3}/s (446.5 cu ft/s)
  - maximum: 35.97 m^{3}/s (1,270 cu ft/s)

Basin features
- River system: Kibish Basin
- Population: 57,300
- Waterbodies: Lopoch swamp

Kibish River is a river of southern Ethiopia, which defines part of that country's border with South Sudan and Kenya. It flows towards Lake Turkana, although some years it does not have enough volume to reach it, as C.W. Gwynn discovered in 1908.

== See also ==
- Omo Kibish
- Rivers of Ethiopia
