= Zigina River =

- Location of mouth

Location
- Country: Ethiopia

Physical characteristics
- Mouth
  - coordinates: 6°42′27″N 36°41′29″E

The Zigina River is a river of southern Ethiopia. It is a south-flowing tributary of the Omo River, entering it on the right bank.

== See also ==
- List of rivers of Ethiopia
