= Cheleleka River =

River in Ethiopia

The Cheleleka is a river of central Ethiopia.

== See also ==
- List of rivers of Ethiopia
