= Denchya River =

River in Ethiopia

The Denchya River is a river of southern Ethiopia. It is a south-flowing tributary of the Omo River, entering it on the right bank at 6°27′30″N 36°19′32″E.

== See also ==
- List of rivers of Ethiopia
