= Keleta River =

Keleta River Geleta

Location
- Country: Ethiopia
- Region: Oromia

Physical characteristics
- Source: Ethiopian Highlands
  - location: Mount Chilalo
  - coordinates: 7°55′34″N 39°17′36″E
  - elevation: 3,583 m (11,755 ft)
- Mouth: Awash River
  - coordinates: 8°25′5″N 39°27′1″E
  - elevation: 1,344 m (4,409 ft)
- Length: 70 km (43 mi)
- Basin size: 933 km^{2} (360 sq mi)
- Discharge
  - location: Mouth
  - average: 4.79 m^{3}/s (169 cu ft/s)
  - minimum: 1.44 m^{3}/s (51 cu ft/s)
  - maximum: 15.9 m^{3}/s (560 cu ft/s)

Basin features
- Progression: Awash → Lake Abbe
- River system: Awash Basin
- Population: 273,000

The Keleta is a river in Ethiopia. It arises near the Chilalo mountains and flows into the Awash River.

== See also ==
- List of rivers of Ethiopia
