= Dinder River =

River in Ethiopia and Sudan

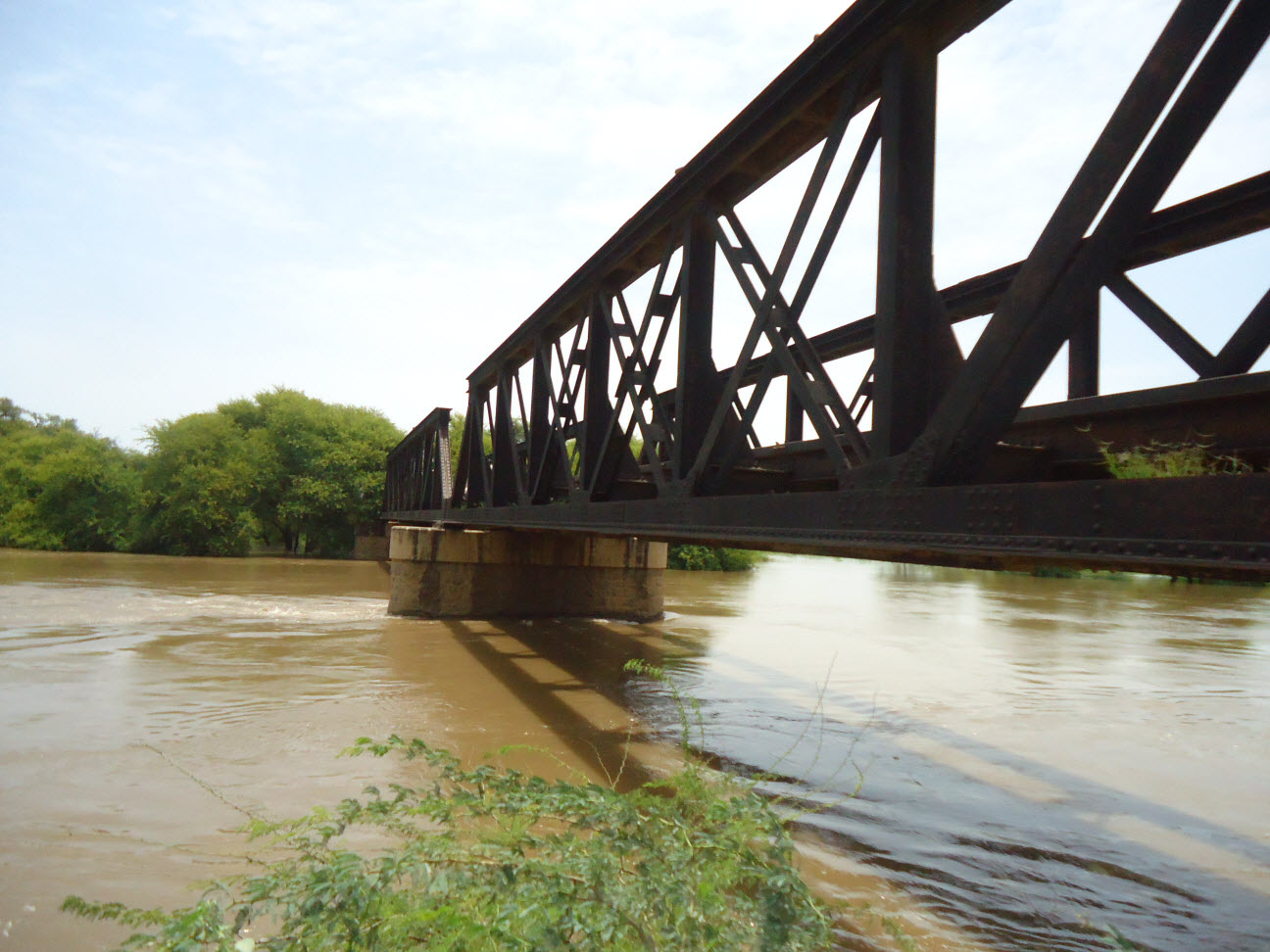

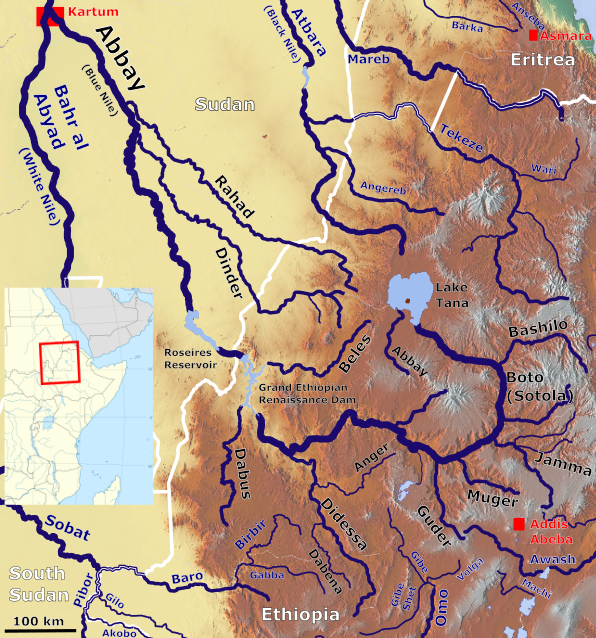
- Map showing the Abbay basin, with the Dinder River(Center left)

Location
- Country: Ethiopia, Sudan

Physical characteristics
- Mouth: Blue Nile
  - location: Al Rabwah, Sudan
  - coordinates: 14°6′0″N 33°40′0″E
  - elevation: 402 m (1,319 ft)
- Length: 784 km (487 mi)
- Basin size: 36,500 km^{2} (14,100 sq mi)

Basin features
- Progression: Blue Nile → Nile → Mediterranean Sea
- River system: Nile Basin

The Dinder River (Arabic: نهر الدندر Nahr-ud-dindir, also spelled Dindar; Amharic: ዲንደር ወንዝ, romanized: dīnideri wenizi) is a tributary of the Blue Nile. It flows through Ethiopia and Sudan for 784 km (487 mi) based on GIS measurements.

== Course ==
The Dinder River rises in the Ethiopian Highlands, west of Lake Tana in the Ethiopian woreda of Alefa. It flows northwest out of the highlands and into the plains of the Sudanese state of Sennar. It meanders across the plains to join the Blue Nile near the town of Sennar.

== Natural features ==
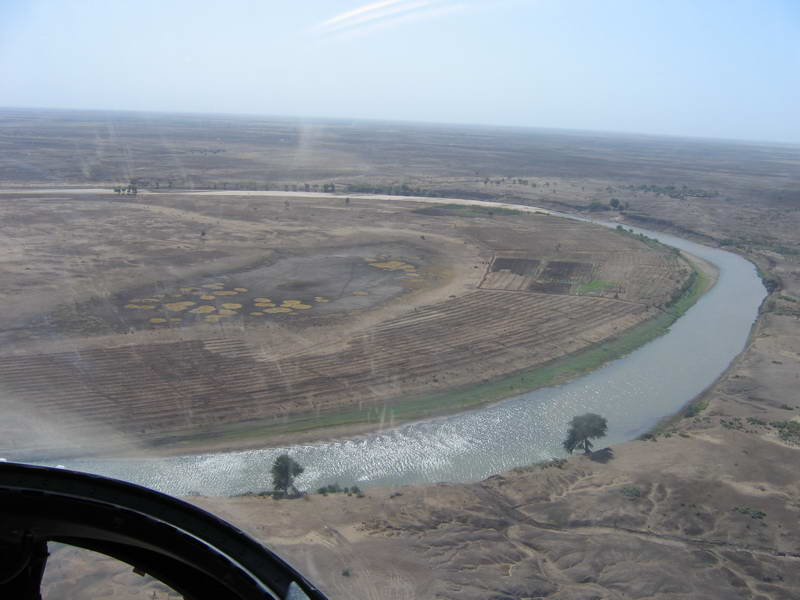
Dinder River On A Plain

The Dinder National Park of Sudan, which stretches south from the Dinder, is named after the river. This watershed was previously habitat to the endangered painted hunting dog, Lycaon pictus; however, this canine is thought to be extirpated in the region due to expansion of the human population and lack of attention to conservation.

== See also ==
- List of rivers of Ethiopia
- List of rivers of Sudan
