= Gololcha River =

River in Ethiopia

Location
- Country: Ethiopia
- Regions: Oromia, Afar

Physical characteristics
- Source
  - location: Dindin Forest
  - coordinates: 8°37′23″N 40°15′44″E
  - elevation: 2,843 m (9,327 ft)
- Mouth: Awash River
  - location: Near Awash
  - coordinates: 9°02′51″N 40°10′57″E
  - elevation: 810 m (2,660 ft)
- Length: 65 km (40 mi)
- Basin size: 365 km^{2} (141 sq mi)
- Discharge
  - location: Mouth
  - average: 0.311 m^{3}/s (11.0 cu ft/s)
  - minimum: 0.037 m^{3}/s (1.3 cu ft/s)
  - maximum: 1.04 m^{3}/s (37 cu ft/s)

Basin features
- Progression: Awash → Lake Abbe
- River system: Awash Basin
- Population: 28,000

Gololcha River is a river of eastern Ethiopia. It flows into the Awash River.
