= Sagan River =

River in Ethiopia

The Sagan River is a seasonal river in southern Ethiopia.

Rising in the Ethiopian Highlands mountains east of Lake Chamo, it flows south then west to join the Weito River at 5°13′N 37°1′E.

It defines part of the boundary between the Southern Nations, Nationalities, and Peoples' Region and the Oromia Region.

Tributaries of the Sagan include the Talpeena.

In 2023, cholera was traced to the river, with confirmed cases identified to human consumption of river water. At the time, the cholera outbreak in the country was the longest in the country's history to date.

== See also ==
- List of rivers of Ethiopia
