= Awetu River =

River in Ethiopia

The Awetu is a river in southwestern Ethiopia, located in Oromia Regional State. The upper reaches are mostly agricultural; the river then flows downstream directly through the city of Jimma. It is a tributary of the Gilgel Gibe River.

The average annual watershed rainfall is about 1699mm. The catchment area of the watershed is 81.9 km^{2}. The elevation range of the watershed is 1698 to 2589 meters above mean sea level. The watershed is largely rural and agricultural, and the western part is forested.

== See also ==
- List of rivers of Ethiopia
