= Akaki River =

River in Ethiopia

Location
- Country: Ethiopia
- Regions: Oromia, Addis Ababa

Physical characteristics
- Source: Ethiopian Highlands via Sendafa River
  - location: Berek Terara/Mount Rufi
  - coordinates: 9°12′52″N 38°59′38″E
  - elevation: 3,183 m (10,443 ft)
- Mouth: Awash River
  - coordinates: 8°37′18″N 38°45′7″E
  - elevation: 1,811 m (5,942 ft)
- Length: 108 km (67 mi)
- Basin size: 1,682 km^{2} (649 sq mi)
- Discharge
  - location: Mouth
  - average: 10.4 m^{3}/s (370 cu ft/s)
  - minimum: 1.43 m^{3}/s (50 cu ft/s)
  - maximum: 49.4 m^{3}/s (1,740 cu ft/s)

Basin features
- Progression: Awash → Lake Abbe
- River system: Awash Basin
- Cities: Addis Ababa, Sendafa
- Population: 7,080,000
- Tributaries
  - left: Sendafa River
- Waterbodies: Aba-Samuel Reservoir, Legedadi Reservoir

The Akaki is a river in central Addis Ababa, Ethiopia. It is a right tributary of the Awash River.

The Akaki River happens to also be the largest river in Addis Ababa, the capital of Ethiopia. However, many do not notice it due to the thick forest cover veiling it, and its apparent loss of interest as it is devoid of the normal river fauna, and the flora is limited to weeds at the edges or trees on the riverbank.

Two smaller rivers join the Akaki at the Aba-Samuel reservoir. These two rivers are the Little Akaki and the Great Akaki; the former is on the western side of the Akaki and the latter is on the east.

== Pollution ==
The city of Addis Ababa has made the Akaki its waste disposal site. This puts the rural population living on the fringes of the city at risk since the Akaki is a source of drinking water for them.

== Avifauna ==
The Akaki is vital for numerous bird species. The Akaki–Aba-Samuel wetlands have been identified by Birdlife International as a crucial staging ground for winter migratory bird species. The wetlands have been known to support as many as 20,000 water birds.

== See also ==
- List of rivers of Ethiopia
