= Lesser Angereb =

River in Ethiopia

Location
- Country: Ethiopia
- Region: Amhara
- Zone: North Gondar

Physical characteristics
- Source
  - location: North of Gondar
  - coordinates: 12.65403°N 37.43192°E
  - elevation: 2,364 m (7,756 ft)
- Mouth: Magech River
  - location: Southern edge of Gondar
  - coordinates: 12°34′54″N 37°27′55″E
  - elevation: 2,021 m (6,631 ft)
- Length: 11.9 km (7.4 mi)
- Basin size: 33 km^{2} (13 sq mi)

Basin features
- Progression: Magech → Lake Tana → Blue Nile → Nile → Mediterranean Sea
- River system: Nile Basin
- Cities: Gondar
- Population: 164,000

The Lesser Angereb is a river of northern Ethiopia. According to G.W.B. Huntingford, it rises north of the city of Gondar, and flows southeast of that city to join the Magech River, which empties into Lake Tana.

The Angereb is known for two bridges that cross it, which were built either by Portuguese artisans or during the reign of Fasilides. One bridge has four arches and the other also has four arches, where it joins with its parent stream.

== See also ==
- List of rivers of Ethiopia
