= Lake Chew Bahir =

Lake in southern Ethiopia

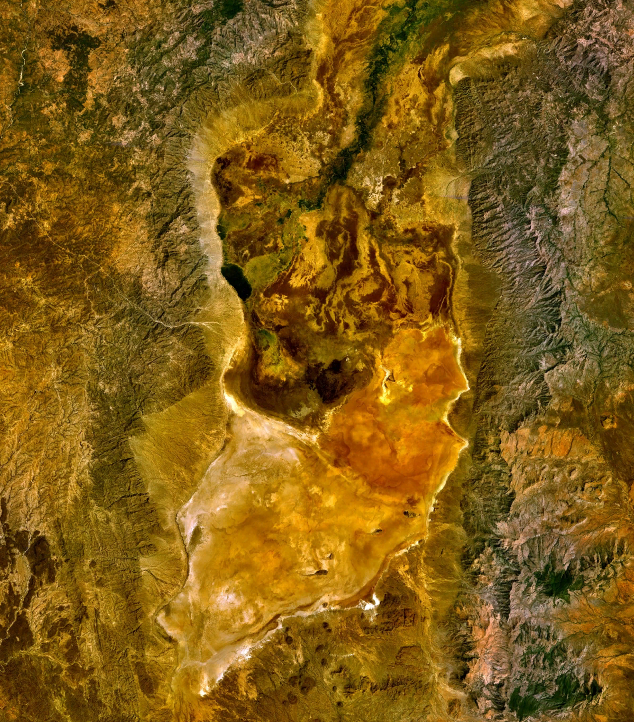
- The remnants of Lake Chew Bahir - as seen from space.

- Location within Ethiopia
- Coordinates: 4°43′N 36°57′E
- Primary outflows: none
- Basin countries: Ethiopia, Kenya
- Max. length: 40 mi (64 km)
- Max. width: 15 mi (24 km)
- Surface elevation: 1,880 ft (570 m)

Lake Chew Bahir (Amharic: ጨው ባሕር č̣ew bāhir, "salty lake") or Lake Istifanos, also called Stefanie, Basso Naebor and Chuwaha, is a lake in southern Ethiopia, located on the southwestern end of the South Ethiopia Regional State, near the border with Oromia Region.

== Geography ==
When the Lake Chew Bahir is filled, it stretches into northern Kenya. Lying at the center of the Stephanie Wildlife Sanctuary, the lake measures some 40 by 15 miles (64 by 24 km).

This lake is the southernmost and lowest (1,880 ft; 570 m) of a series of lakes which lie in the north-easterly continuation of the Great Rift Valley; its watershed is separated from the watershed of Lake Turkana by the Humu Range and the hills south of it. The Kumbi Range rises on its eastern side. Chew Bahir is fed from the north by the Weito River, and its tributary the Galana Sagan. The Galana Sagan receives the overflow of Lake Chamo in some years, but no permanent connection exists.

== History ==
Count Sámuel Teleki was the first European to visit the lake in 1888, and named it for Princess Stéphanie of Belgium, the wife of Crown Prince Rudolf of Austria. Following Teleki's visit, Lake Chew Bahir and the neighboring lakes were explored by Arthur Donaldson Smith, Vittorio Bottego, M. S. Welby, Oscar Neumann and others. J. J. Harrison in 1899 found the lake quite dried up, and two years later Count Wickenburg found water only in the northern part. In 1960 the lake covered about 2,000 km^{2}, but shrank to a swamp over the rest of the 20th century.
