= Urbanization in Ethiopia =

Ethiopia is a mostly agrarian rural country with only its capital, Addis Ababa, having over 1 million people. However the urban population of Ethiopia has expanded dramatically, from 10.8 million in 2002 to 28 million in 2022, a growth of 160%, which has resulted in the urban population as a percentage of the total population growing from 15% to 23% over the same time period. As of at least 2024, it continues to be one of the most rapidly urbanizing countries in the world.

== Growth of Ethiopian cities ==
City	Regional State	Population (2007)	Population (2023)	Growth (%)
Addis Ababa	None	2,739,551	3,945,000	▲44.00%
Bahir Dar	Amhara	155,428	365,957	▲135.45%
Gondar	Amhara	207,044	487,224	▲135.32%
Dire Dawa	None	233,224	355,000	▲52.21%
Adama	Oromia	220,212	480,175	▲118.05%
Hawassa	Sidama	157,139	441,536	▲180.98%
Harar	Harari	99,368	162,000	▲61.34%
Jimma	Oromia	120,960	263,709	▲118.01%
Dessie	Amhara	120,095	282,697	▲135.39%
