= Rahad River =

River in Ethiopia and Sudan

Rahad River Shinfa
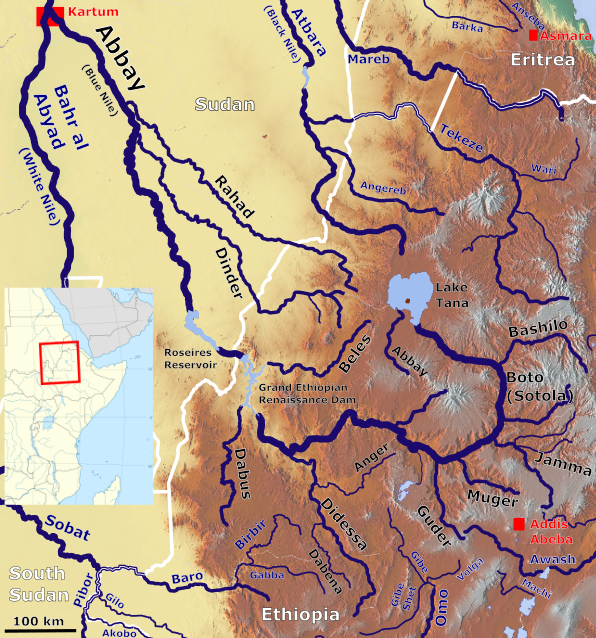

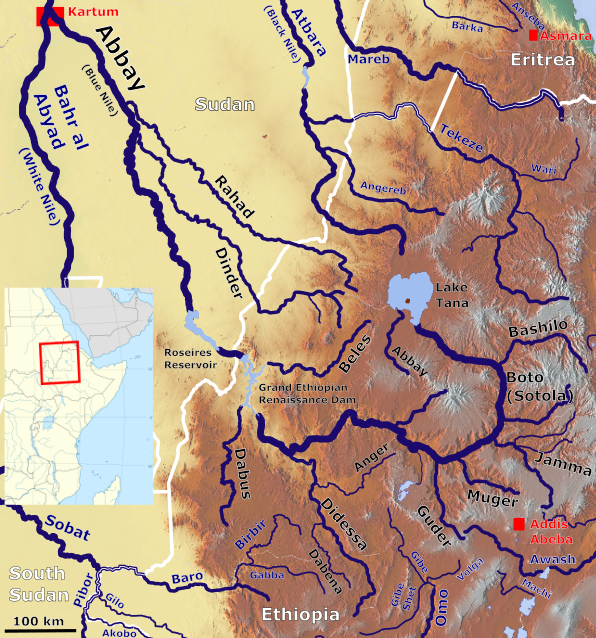
- Map showing the Abbay basin, with the Rahad River (Center left).

Location
- Country: Ethiopia, Sudan

Physical characteristics
- Mouth: Blue Nile
  - location: Wad Madani
  - coordinates: 14°28′0″N 33°31′0″E
- Length: 665 km (413 mi)
- Basin size: 42,400 km^{2} (16,400 sq mi)

Basin features
- Progression: Blue Nile→ Nile→ Mediterranean Sea
- River system: Nile Basin

The Rahad is a river that flows in Ethiopia and eastern Sudan. The sources of this river are in Ethiopia, where it is called Shinfa, and a tributary of the Abay (Blue Nile) on the right side. The river has its origins in the Ethiopian Highlands (west of Lake Tana), from where it flows 480 km (300 miles) (with a total length of about 665 km (413 mi)) into eastern Sudan. In Sudan, it merges into the Blue Nile.

A black-maned Sudan lion was described from this river.

== See also ==
- Er Rahad
- List of rivers of Ethiopia
