= Gumara River =

River in Ethiopia

- Map of Lake Tana showing the inflowing rivers

Location
- Country: Ethiopia
- Region: Amhara
- Zone: South Gondar

Physical characteristics
- Source: 11.61073°N 37.97785°E
  - coordinates: 11.601240°N 38.003587°E
  - elevation: 2,555 m (8,383 ft)
- Mouth: Lake Tana
  - coordinates: 11°54′N 37°30′E
  - elevation: 1,786 m (5,860 ft)
- Length: 103 km (64 mi)
- Basin size: 1,600 km^{2} (620 sq mi)
- Discharge
  - location: Mouth (estimate)
  - average: 39.66 m^{3}/s (1,401 cu ft/s)
  - minimum: 13.4 m^{3}/s (470 cu ft/s)
  - maximum: 76.3 m^{3}/s (2,690 cu ft/s)

Basin features
- Progression: Lake Tana → Blue Nile → Nile → Mediterranean Sea
- River system: Nile Basin
- Population: 463,000

The Gumara is a river of northern-western Ethiopia. It empties into Lake Tana into a bird's-foot delta from the east. Hot springs on the Gumara's banks at Wanzaye, which were popular in medicinal hot baths from the late 18th century till now, were already mentioned by missionary Henry Stern.

The river is an important spawning ground for native fish species, which include barbus, tilapia and catfish.
