= Atbarah River =

River flowing between Ethiopia and Sudan

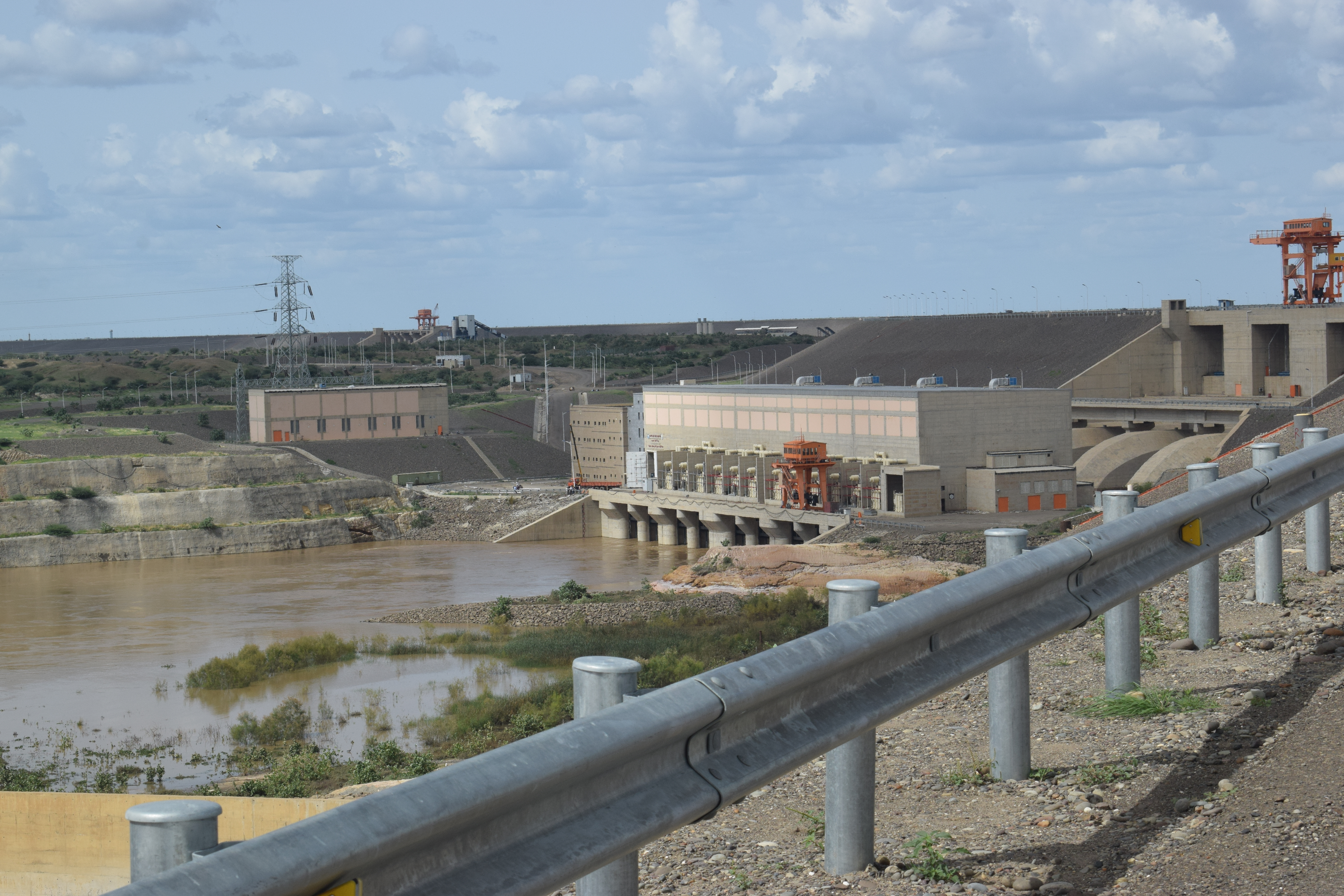
- Upper Atbara and Setit Dam Complex Hydroelectric Power Plant

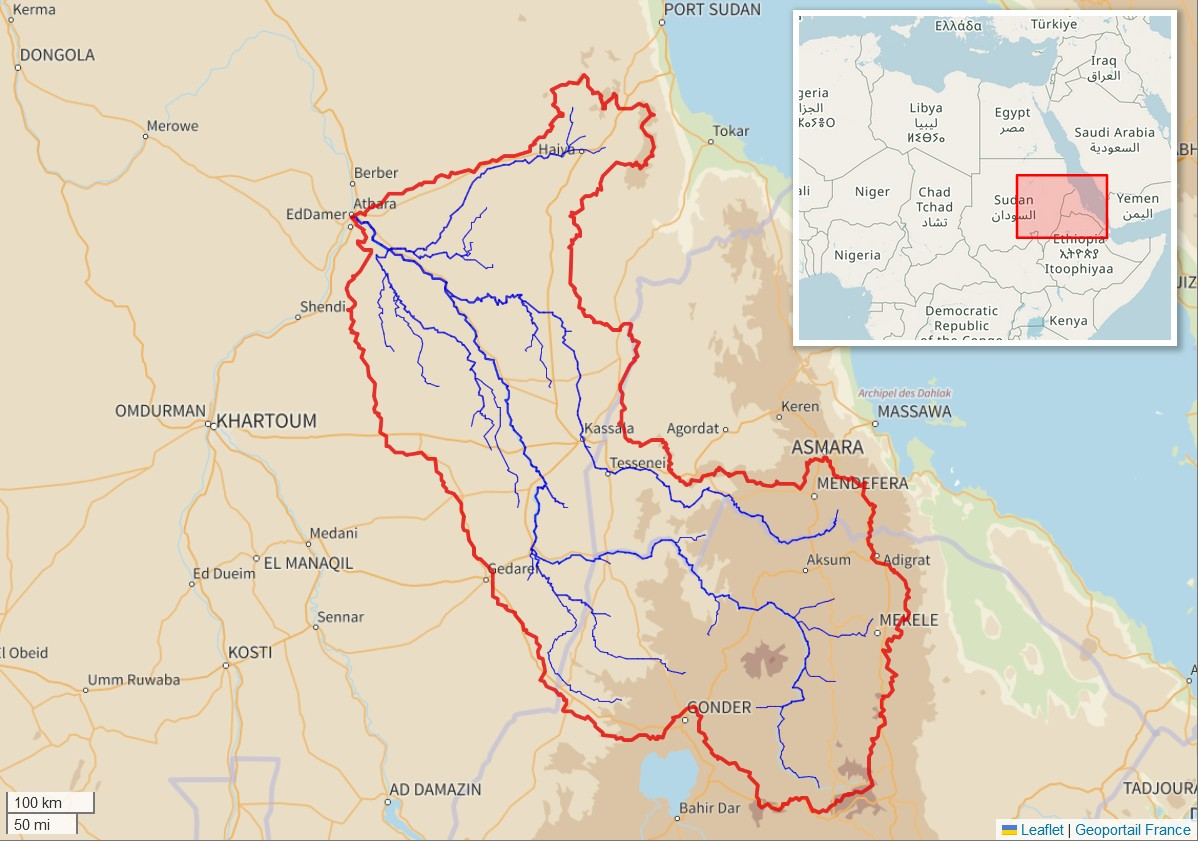
- Atbarah River Basin (Interactive map)

Location
- Countries: Ethiopia; Sudan

Physical characteristics
- Mouth
  - location: Discharges into the Nile
  - coordinates: 17.6781°N 33.9735°E
- Length: 805 kilometres (500 mi)
- Basin size: 69,000 square kilometres (27,000 mi^{2})
- Discharge
  - average: 374 m^{3}/s (13,200 cu ft/s)

The Atbarah River (Arabic: نهر عطبرة; transliterated: Nahr 'Atbarah), also referred to as the Red Nile and / or Black Nile, is a river in northeast Africa. It rises in northwest Ethiopia, approximately 50 km north of Lake Tana and 30 km west of Gondar. It then flows about 805 km (500 mi) to the Nile in north-central Sudan, joining it at the city of Atbarah (17.677°N 33.970°E). The river's tributary, the Tekezé (Setit) River, is perhaps the true upper course of the Atbarah, as the Tekezé follows the longer course prior to the confluence of the two rivers (at 14° 10' N, 36° E) in northeastern Sudan. The Atbarah is the last tributary of the Nile before it reaches the Mediterranean.

For much of the year, it is little more than a stream. However, during the rainy season (generally July to October), the Atbarah rises some 18 ft (5 m) above its normal level. At this time, it forms a formidable barrier between the northern and central districts of the Amhara Region of Ethiopia. Besides the Tekezé, other important tributaries of the Atbarah include the Shinfa River which rises west of Lake Tana, and the Greater Angereb which has its source north of the city of Gondar.

== History ==
The earliest surviving mention of the Atbarah is by Strabo (16.4.8), who called the river Astaboras (Greek: Ασταβόρας). Other ancient authors mentioning the name include Agatharchides, who called it Astabaras (Greek: Ασταβάρας), and Ptolemy (Geography 4.7). Richard Pankhurst and others have argued that the name should be understood as "River of the Boras people", where asta can be related to Proto-Nubian asti "water", while -boras can be linked to a number of Roman allusions to a tribe named the Bora (Bera), who lived near Meroe, and another tribe named the Megabares (Greek: Μεγάβαροι in Eratosthenes and Strabo, Latin: Megabarri in Pliny the Elder). Pliny the Elder provides a slightly different etymology of Astaboras, stating that "in the language of the local people" the name means "water coming from the shades below" (N.H. 5.10).

In April 1898 a major battle was fought beside the river during the Anglo-Egyptian invasion of Sudan 1896–1899 between Mahdist forces and an Anglo-Egyptian Army under the command of Lord Kitchener, which resulted in the destruction of the 20,000-strong Mahdist detachment.

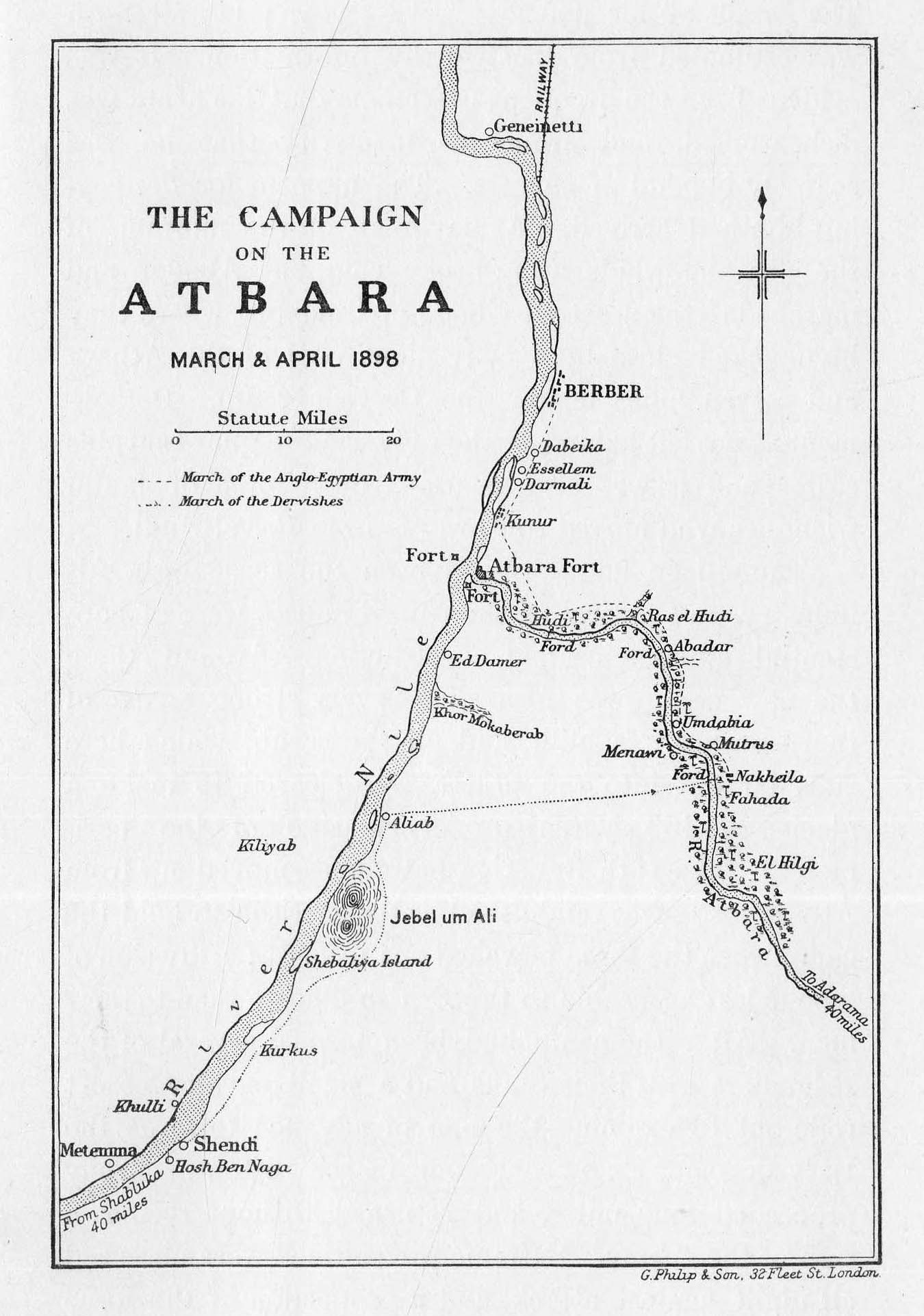
Atbara river campaign

In 1964, the river was dammed by the Khashm el-Girba Dam near Kassala in Sudan to provide irrigation to the newly built town of Halfa Dughaym in an otherwise fairly arid region and to resettle the Sudanese population driven away by the Aswan High Dam (Sad al-Aali) in Egypt, which flooded 500 km of the Nile Valley in southern Egypt and northern Sudan.

Construction on a $1.9 billion twin dam project about 20 km upstream from the confluence of the Upper Atbara and Setit rivers, the Rumela and Burdana dams, began in 2011 and was inaugurated by President Omar al-Bashir in February 2017.

== Hydrology ==
Average monthly flow (1912–1982) of the Atbarah measured approximately 25 km upstream of its mouth, measured in m^{3}/s:

== See also ==
- List of rivers of Ethiopia
- List of rivers of Sudan
