= List of rivers of South Sudan =

This is a list of streams and rivers in South Sudan, arranged geographically by drainage basin. There is an alphabetic list at the end of this article. The list may not be comprehensive.

The hydrology of the eastern part of South Sudan is complicated by the Sudd, a vast area of marshland into which many rivers flow and lose their identity. Much of the water entering the Sudd is lost to evaporation, but much ultimately drains to the White Nile. Ninety percent of South Sudan lies in the White Nile basin The three major cities of South Sudan are all located on the White Nile or a major tributary.

== Flowing into the Mediterranean ==
- Nile (Egypt, Sudan)
  - White Nile
    - Adar River
      - Machar Marshes, into which flow
        - Yabus River
        - Daga River
        - Khor Machar
    - Sobat River
      - Baro River
        - Jikawo River
      - Pibor River
        - Akobo River
        - Agwei River
          - Abara River
          - Kongkong River
        - Kangen River
        - Lotilla River
          - Veveno River
    - Bahr el Zeraf
    - Bahr el Ghazal
      - Bahr al-Arab (Kiir River)
        - Lol River
          - Sopo River
            - Kuru River
          - Pongo River
        - Adda River
      - Jur River
        - Sue River
        - Waw Nahr
        - Numatinna River
    - Lau River
    - Gel River
    - Aswa River (Achwa)
    - Yei River
    - Kebe River
    - Kaya River
    - Kindi River
    - Kemi River
    - kizu River
    - Kembe River

== Flowing into marshes ==
- Koss River
- Kidepo River
- Medikiret River

== Flowing into endorheic basins ==
=== Lake Turkana ===
- Kibish River

== Alphabetical list ==
- Abara River
- Achwa
- Adar River
- Agwei River
- Akobo River
- Bahr el Ghazal River
- Bahr el Naam River
- Bahr el Zeraf
- Baro River
- Daga River
- Ibba River
- Jikawo River
- Jur River
- Kangen River
- Kibish River
- Kidepo River
- Kiir River
- Kongkong River
- Koss River
- Kuru River
- Lol River
- Lotilla River
- Maridi River
- Medikiret River
- Pibor River
- Pongo River
- Sobat River
- Sopo River
- Suuwe River
- Tigi River
- Veveno River
- Wau River
- White Nile
- Yabus River
- Yei River

== See also ==
- List of rivers of Africa
- List of rivers of Sudan
