= Aswa =

Aswa may refer to:

== Settlements and areas ==
- Aswa County, a county in Uganda
- Aswa, Uganda, a village in Uganda
- Aswa, South Sudan, a village and IDP camp in South Sudan
- Aswa-Lolim Game Reserve, a now-degazetted wildlife reserve in Uganda
- Aswa Ranch a defunct beef ranch run by the parastatal Uganda Livestock Industries

== Geology and hydrology ==
- Achwa (also spelled Aswa, Asua and Assua), a river flowing from Uganda into South Sudan
- Aswa Dislocation, a 300 km shear zone in Uganda, forming the channel of the above river
- A small stream in Kibale, Uganda
- A small stream in Nebbi, Uganda
