= Achwa Hydroelectric Power Station =

Achwa Hydroelectric Power Station may refer to one of the following:

- Achwa 1 Hydroelectric Power Station, a 41 megawatts hydroelectric power station across the Achwa River in Uganda
- Achwa 2 Hydroelectric Power Station, a 42 megawatts hydroelectric power station across Achwa River in Uganda
