= Abara River =

- Location of mouth in South Sudan

Location
- Country: South Sudan

Physical characteristics
- Mouth
  - coordinates: 7.45°N 33.2333°E

The Abara River, also known as Abara Khawr, is a stream in Jonglei, South Sudan. It is a tributary of the Agwei River, which is formed at the confluence of the Abara and the Kongkong River just east of Bongak. The stream is a wadi, or ravine, that may run dry during the dry season but quickly becomes a watercourse due to heavy rainfall during the wet season.

== Geography ==
The Abara River flows across the low-lying plains of Jonglei State before joining the Kongkong River to form the Agwei River. The surrounding landscape is characterized by broad alluvial plains, seasonally inundated grasslands, and wetlands typical of eastern South Sudan. The river ultimately contributes runoff to the Pibor, Sobat and White Nile rivers.

== Hydrology ==
The Abara River is an intermittent watercourse whose flow depends largely on seasonal rainfall. During the rainy season, runoff increases rapidly and connects the river with the Agwei River, while parts of the channel may become dry during prolonged dry periods. This seasonal hydrological regime is typical of many rivers draining the eastern plains of South Sudan.

== Scientific documentation ==
The Abara River has received little individual scientific attention. Most published information is derived from regional hydrological surveys, official topographic mapping, and hydrographic databases covering the Sobat and White Nile basins. As a result, the river is generally documented as part of the wider Nile drainage network rather than as an independently studied river.

=== See also ===
- Agwei River
- Kongkong River
- Pibor River
- Sobat River
- White Nile
- List of rivers of South Sudan
