= Yal =

Yal, or YAL, can mean:

- Boeing YAL-1, a US Air Force test aircraft for anti-missile laser development
- Yāḻ, an ancient Tamil harp
- YAL, the IATA code for Alert Bay Airport in British Columbia, Canada
- YAL, the National Rail code for Yalding railway station in Kent, UK
- Yal (boat), a type of Russian rowboat
- Yal (river), a river in South Sudan
- Young Americans for Liberty, an American right libertarian association
- Young Australia League, an Australian youth organisation
