= List of rivers of Uganda =

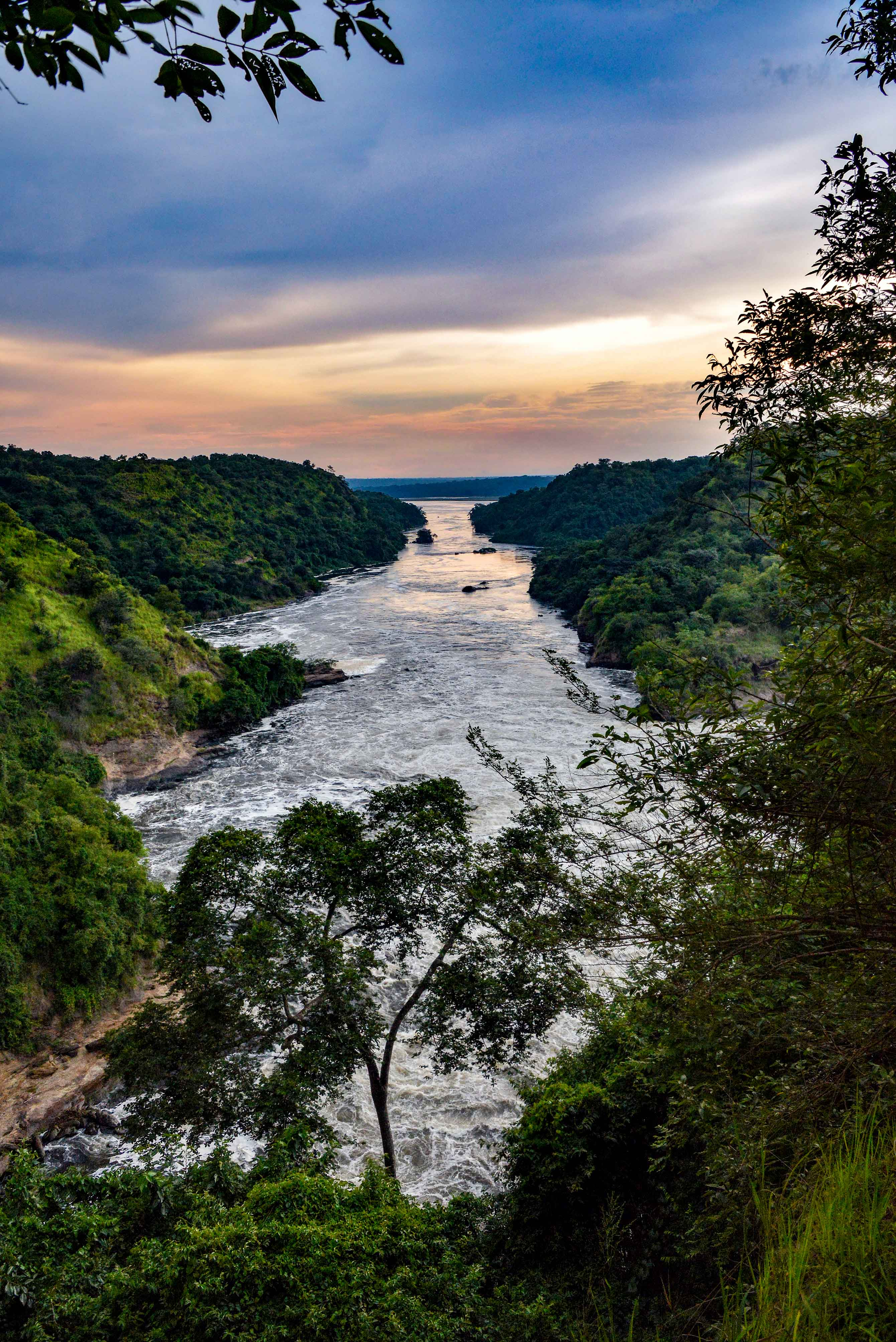
White Nile River

Uganda has one of the most extensive inland water systems in Africa. Nearly all of the country's surface water drains into the Nile Basin through a network of rivers, lakes, wetlands, and tributaries. Major rivers include the Victoria Nile, Albert Nile, Kagera, Katonga, Achwa (Aswa), Kafu, Semliki, and Ishasha rivers. Uganda's river systems are closely associated with the Great Lakes, particularly Lakes Victoria, Kyoga, Albert, Edward, and George. The Victoria Nile flows from Lake Victoria through Lake Kyoga into Lake Albert, where it becomes the Albert Nile before entering South Sudan as part of the White Nile system.

== Drainage basins ==
Uganda's rivers belong almost entirely to the Nile drainage basin. Rivers originating in the country's central, eastern, and southern regions generally flow into Lake Victoria or Lake Kyoga before reaching the Nile. Rivers in western Uganda drain into Lakes Edward, George, and Albert, eventually joining the Nile through the Semliki and Albert Nile systems.

== List of rivers by drainage basin ==
=== White Nile system (Bahr al Jabal) ===
- Kidepo River
- Narus River
- Achwa River
- Pager River
- Ora River
- Nyagak River
- Victoria Nile
- River Kafu (Kabi River)
- Lugogo River
- Mayanja River
- Lake Kyoga
- Lake Bisina
- Okok River

=== Lake Victoria Basin ===
- Katonga River
- Mpaga River
- Sezibwa River
- Dura River
- Kibiimba River
- Kagera River
- Lwajjali River

=== Lake Albert Basin ===
- Nkusi River
- River Muzizi
- Semliki River
- Lamia River

=== Lake Edward and Lake George basin ===
- Ishasha River
- Nyamwamba River
- Mubuku River
- Kyambura River
- Nyamugasani River
- Mitano River

=== Turkana Basin ===
- Turkwel River
- Suam River

== Hydrology ==
The country's drainage system is dominated by the Nile River. Water from Lake Victoria exits at Jinja and forms the Victoria Nile, which flows northward through Lake Kyoga before entering Lake Albert. From Lake Albert, the river continues as the Albert Nile and subsequently the White Nile. The Semliki River, which links Lakes Edward and Albert, is one of the most important western tributaries of the Nile system in Uganda.

== See also ==
- Uganda
- Nile
- List of lakes of Uganda
