= Bukteng, South Sudan =

Bukteng
- Town
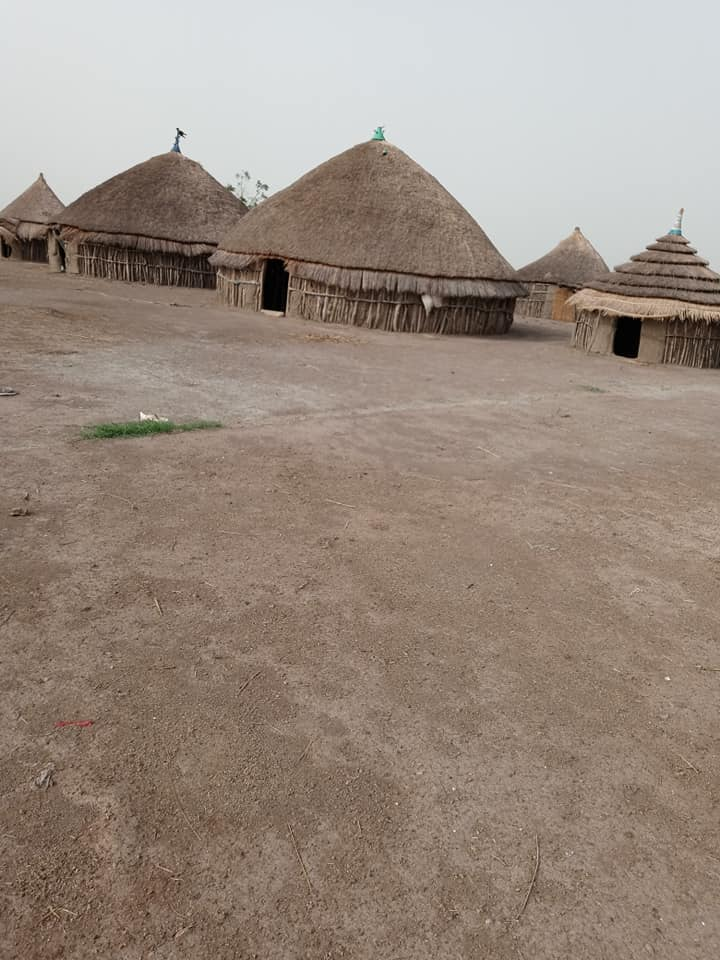
- Huts in BukTeng

- Location within South Sudan
- Coordinates: 8.404075°N 33.187738°E
- Country: South Sudan
- Region: Greater Upper Nile
- State: Upper Nile State

Population (2022)
  - Total: 7,000

Bukteng is a small town located in the Ulang County of Upper Nile State, in the Greater Upper Nile region of South Sudan. It is situated approximately 10 kilometers south of Jikmir. BukTeng has a population of approximately 2,000 to 3,000 people, primarily from the Nuer ethnic group.

== Geography ==
BukTeng is situated on a flat plain, surrounded by grasslands and scattered trees. The town is located near the Gilo River, which provides water for drinking and irrigation. Key towns bordering BukTeng include Makak, Jikmir, and Kuanythony Nyang.

== History ==
In recent years, BukTeng has been affected by the ongoing civil war in South Sudan and global warming. Due to the armed conflict and extreme floods, the town has experienced displacement of its population during the rainy seasons.

== Economy ==
Agriculture is the main source of income for the people of BukTeng. The town is known for its production of sorghum, maize, and other cereals. Fishing is also an important economic activity, with the Gilo River providing a source of fish.

BukTeng has limited infrastructure, no paved roads or electricity.
