= Narus River, Uganda =

River in the Uganda

Narus River
- Location within Uganda

Location
- Country: Uganda, South Sudan
- Region: Karamoja
- District: Kaabong, Eastern Equatoria
- City: Apoka

Physical characteristics
- Source: Narus Valley
  - location: Kidepo Valley National Park, Karamoja, Uganda
  - coordinates: 3°40′13″N 33°46′11″E
- Mouth: Kidepo River
  - location: Komoloich, Sudan
  - coordinates: 3°58′N 33°35′E

Basin features
- Tributaries
  - right: Namamkweng

The Narus River flows in a northwesterly direction through the southern portion of Kidepo Valley National Park in northern Uganda, joining the larger Kidepo River near Komoloich, about 13 kilometres (8.1 mi) after entering Eastern Equatoria state of South Sudan. The name Narus is derived from the Karamajong word for mud.

The Narus Valley has a 40% higher mean annual precipitation than the Kidepo Valley (89 centimetres (35 in) versus 64 centimetres (25 in)). Together with a different soil structure, this creates perennial swamps and water pools along the Narus River in the middle of undulating grassland and bushland mosaic savanna, which draw plains game and are home to the Nile crocodile. Most of the Park's tourist infrastructure is in Narus Valley, as much of the game from the more expansive northern Kidepo Valley migrates there during the dry season.

== See also ==
- Narus valley kidepo
- Kidepo Valley National Park
- List of rivers of Uganda
- List of rivers of South Sudan
