= Lotilla River =

- Location of mouth in South Sudan

Location
- Country: South Sudan

Physical characteristics
- Mouth
  - coordinates: 6.78333°N 33.15°E

The Lotilla River is a river in South Sudan. It rises in marshes on the borders of the erstwhile Eastern Equatoria and Jonglei states and flows north to join the Pibor River near Pibor, at a junction with the Kangen River. The marshes are fed by the Medikiret River, which has its origins in marshes further south.

== See also ==
- List of rivers of South Sudan
