= Yabus River =

River in South Sudan

Yabus River Khor Yabus
- Location of mouth in South Sudan

Location
- Country: South Sudan, Sudan, Ethiopia

Physical characteristics
- Source
  - coordinates: 9.480521°N 34.462993°E
  - elevation: 1,346 m (4,416 ft)
- Mouth: Machar Marshes
  - coordinates: 9°52′N 33°35′E
  - elevation: 432 m (1,417 ft)
- Length: 192 km (119 mi)
- Basin size: 6,080 km^{2} (2,350 sq mi)
- Discharge
  - location: Mouth (estimate)
  - average: 34.57 m^{3}/s (1,221 cu ft/s)
  - minimum: 3.61 m^{3}/s (127 cu ft/s)
  - maximum: 103.82 m^{3}/s (3,666 cu ft/s)

Basin features
- Progression: Machar Marshes → Adar → White Nile → Nile → Mediterranean Sea
- River system: Nile Basin
- Cities: Bunj
- Population: 227,000

The Yabus River (or Khor Yabus) rises in the far west of Ethiopia, in Asosa Zone, flows west into Sudan past the town of Yabus, then enters South Sudan. At the town of Bunj it turns south west and enters the Machar Marshes, where it loses its identity.

The river is sometimes confused with the Dabus River, a tributary of the Blue Nile, also known as the Yabus River. The sources of the two rivers are close to each other.

== See also ==
- List of rivers of South Sudan
- List of rivers of Sudan
- List of rivers of Ethiopia
