= Veveno River =

- Location of mouth in South Sudan

Location
- Country: South Sudan

Physical characteristics
- Mouth
  - coordinates: 6°40′44″N 32°58′20″E

The Veveno River is a river in eastern South Sudan by the Imatong Mountains. It is a tributary of the Lotilla River, which it joins southwest of Pibor.

== See also ==
- List of rivers of South Sudan
