= Jikawo River =

River in Ethiopia and South Sudan

- Location of mouth in South Sudan
- Etymology: Shared with Jikawo

Location
- Countries: Ethiopia, South Sudan

Physical characteristics
- Source
  - coordinates: 8.888134°N 34.741041°E
  - elevation: 2,418 m (7,933 ft)
- Mouth: Baro River
  - location: Near Jikawo
  - coordinates: 8°22′N 33°46′E
  - elevation: 415 m (1,362 ft)
- Length: 151 km (94 mi)
- Basin size: 1,940 km^{2} (750 sq mi)
- Discharge
  - location: Mouth (estimate)
  - average: 23.07 m^{3}/s (815 cu ft/s)
  - minimum: 6.32 m^{3}/s (223 cu ft/s)
  - maximum: 44.23 m^{3}/s (1,562 cu ft/s)

Basin features
- Progression: Baro → Sobat → White Nile → Nile → Mediterranean Sea
- River system: Nile Basin
- Cities: Pagak
- Population: 51,100

Jikawo River is a river of southwestern Ethiopia. It is a tributary of the Baro River, which it joins at latitude and longitude 8°22′N 33°46′E.

The river rises in Ethiopia, and in its lower course forms the border with South Sudan.

== See also ==
- List of rivers of Ethiopia
- List of rivers of South Sudan
