= Pager River =

River in northern Uganda

Location
- Country: Uganda
- Region: Northern Region
- District: Kitgum District

Physical characteristics
- Mouth: Achwa River
- Length: 194.79 km

Basin features
- River system: Nile (via Achwa River and the White Nile)

The Pager River is a river of Uganda in East Africa. It flows through the northern part of the country and joins the Achwa River. The river flows next to Kitgum Matidi in Kitgum district Uganda. It covers a total distance of 194.79 kilometres.

== Course and drainage ==
Studies describe the Pager River as running through Labongo Layamo, Labongo Akwang and Labongo Amida sub-counties and Kitgum municipality before joining the Achwa River, near where the Agago River also enters the Achwa system.

Kitgum District planning documents describe many local streams draining into the Pager River, which flows westward across the district to join the Aswa (Achwa) River, a tributary within the Nile system.

== Settlements ==
The river is closely associated with Kitgum’s urban area. A sanitation and solid-waste management case study notes that Kitgum Town lies on the bank of River Pager and treats Pager as the town’s major river.

An earlier urban study reported that the town site was encircled on three sides by the River Pager.

== Flooding and risk ==
A national hazard profile for Kitgum reports flash flooding in low-lying areas linked to the Pager River and documents a 2011 incident where a flash flood temporarily disrupted traffic at Pager Bridge in Kitgum Town Council.

Media reports have also described floods after the river burst its banks in Kitgum Municipality, submerging nearby gardens and fish ponds in Pager and Central divisions (July 2020).

Environment and land useDistrict planning documents note poorly drained soils (gleysols) along the Pager River corridor in Kitgum District.

Kitgum Municipality and national agencies have taken steps focused on river buffer protection. Uganda Radio Network reported proposals to gazette River Pager buffer zones into Uganda’s National Wetland Atlas, linked to encroachment and degrading activities such as sand mining, brickmaking, grazing, car-washing, agriculture and construction along the banks.

In January 2025, The Independent reported a municipal directive requiring farmers to vacate the Pager River buffer zone in Kitgum Municipality, citing enforcement of national environmental law on river buffers.

== Water quality ==
A peer-reviewed study reported that parts of the Pager River in and near Kitgum Municipality are affected by pollution pressures linked to dense settlements and discharge of wastes, and assessed toxic metal contamination risks from river water contact and intake.

== See also ==
- Achwa River
- Kitgum
- Kitgum District
- List of Rivers of Uganda
