= Akobo River =

River on the Ethiopia–South Sudan border

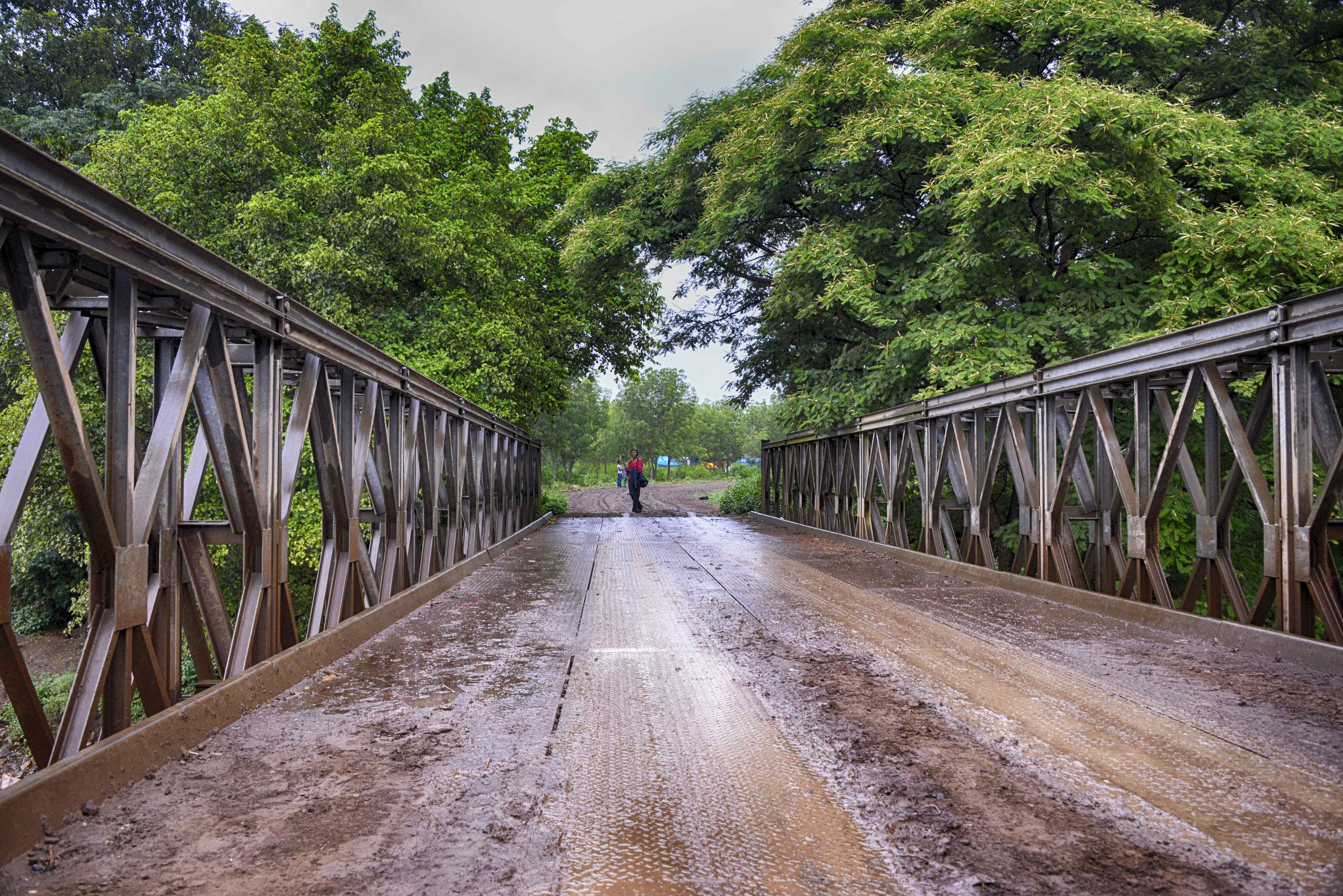
- Akobo River Bridge

- Location of mouth

Location
- Countries: Ethiopia; South Sudan

Physical characteristics
- Source
  - coordinates: 6°57′28″N 34°53′25″E
  - elevation: 1,901 m (6,237 ft)
- Mouth: Pibor River
  - location: Akobo, South Sudan
  - coordinates: 7.7944°N 33.0461°E
  - elevation: 408 m (1,339 ft)
- Length: 434 km (270 mi)
- Basin size: 6,250 km^{2} (2,410 mi^{2})
- Discharge
  - location: Mouth
  - average: 106.4 m^{3}/s (3,760 cu ft/s)
  - minimum: 22.6 m^{3}/s (800 cu ft/s)
  - maximum: 255 m^{3}/s (9,000 cu ft/s)

Basin features
- Progression: Pibor → Sobat → White Nile → Nile → Mediterranean Sea
- River system: Nile
- Population: 13,500
- Tributaries
  - left: Neubari River; Ajuba River; Kaia River
  - right: Cechi River; Chiarini River; Owag

The Akobo River is a river on the border between South Sudan and Ethiopia. From its source in the Ethiopian Highlands near Mizan Teferi it flows west for 434 kilometres (270 mi) to join the Pibor River. The Pibor flows into the Sobat River, which in turn empties into the White Nile.

The tributaries of the Akobo river include the Cechi, the Chiarini, and the Owag, on the right (Ethiopian) side; and the Neubari, Ajuba and Kaia on the left (South Sudanese) side.

== History ==
The boundary between Sudan and Ethiopia was defined for the region near the Akobo River in 1899, by Major H.H. Austin and Major Charles W. Gwynn of the British Royal Engineers. They had no knowledge of the land, its inhabitants, or their languages, and were short on supplies. Rather than defining a line based on ethnic groups and traditional territories, essentially along the escarpment that separates the highlands and the plains, Majors Austin and Gwynn simply proposed drawing the line down the middle of the Akobo River and parts of the Pibor River and Baro River. This boundary was consummated in the Anglo-Ethiopian Treaty of 1902, resulting in an area in the Ethiopian Gambela Region called the Baro Salient.

The Baro Salient is more closely connected to South Sudan than Ethiopia, both in terms of natural features and people. The Baro Salient was used as a sanctuary by Sudanese insurgents during the country's long civil wars. It was difficult for Sudan to exert authority over a region that is part of Ethiopia, and Ethiopia was reluctant to police this remote region and become involved in the politics of Sudan's internal conflicts.

The Akobo has been the subject of several mining surveys. In 1939, engineers of Companies Mineralia Ethiopia (COMINA) carried out exploration of the Akobo and its tributaries. North-flowing tributaries appeared to be more promising than the south-flowing ones. Values up to 10 grams of gold per cubic meter were found in Chama creek, and the possible average value could be 0.7 g per cubic meter. In the period 1952–1954 the Ministry of Mines employed as many as 120 miners at a time. They produced an average of 1.66 grams of gold per day.

== See also ==
- List of rivers of South Sudan
- List of rivers of Ethiopia
