= Machar Marshes =

Group of Wetlands in Upper Nile, Sudan

Coordinates: 10.3833°N 32.2500°E

The Machar Marshes are a large area of wetlands in the state of Upper Nile, South Sudan. Estimates of their size vary. A 1950 study put the area of swamp at 6,500 km^{2}. A 1980 study put the area of permanent swamp at 8,700 km^{2}, 60% of which was grass and forest.

The marshes are fed by waters from the Khor Machar (a distributary of the Baro River), the Yabus River and the Daga River. At times of high water they are also fed by spill from the Pibor River. The marshes are drained by the Adar River, a tributary of the White Nile.
