= Daga Post =

Daga Post Dajo
- City
- Location of Daga Post within South Sudan
- Coordinates: 9°13′N 33°58′E
- Country: South Sudan
- Region: Greater Upper Nile
- State: Upper Nile
- County: Longechuk County

Daga Post is a town in the Longechuk County of Upper Nile State, in the Greater Upper Nile region of South Sudan on the Daga River, near the border with Ethiopia. It lies on the same longitude as Addis Ababa, the Ethiopian capital.
