= Daga River (South Sudan) =

River in Ethiopia and South Sudan

Daga River Deqe Sonka Shet, Khor Daga
- Location of mouth in South Sudan

Location
- Country: South Sudan, Ethiopia

Physical characteristics
- Source
  - coordinates: 8.946893°N 34.601764°E
  - elevation: 2,048 m (6,719 ft)
- Mouth: Machar Marshes
  - coordinates: 9°32′N 33°24′E
  - elevation: 410 m (1,350 ft)
- Length: 337 km (209 mi)
- Basin size: 6,630 km^{2} (2,560 sq mi)
- Discharge
  - location: Mouth (estimate)
  - average: 44.4 m^{3}/s (1,570 cu ft/s)
  - minimum: 5.93 m^{3}/s (209 cu ft/s)
  - maximum: 113.89 m^{3}/s (4,022 cu ft/s)

Basin features
- Progression: Machar Marshes → Adar → White Nile → Nile → Mediterranean Sea
- River system: Nile Basin
- Population: 52,000

The Daga River (or Khor Daga) is a river in South Sudan. It rises in the mountains of the Mirab Welega Zone in Ethiopia, just east of the South Sudan-Ethiopia border, where it is known as the Deqe Sonka Shet. It flows west past the town of Daga Post and discharges into the Machar Marshes.
