= Aswa, South Sudan =

Aswa
- IDP Camp
- Location in South Sudan
- Coordinates: 3.72268°N 31.97112°E
- Country: South Sudan
- Region: Equatoria
- State: Eastern Equatoria
- County: Magwi County

Aswa was an Internally displaced persons camp during the Second Sudanese Civil War near Nimule on the South Sudan-Uganda border.

== Location ==
Aswa lies in Magwi County, Eastern Equatoria about 18 km north of Nimule on the eastern banks of the Aswa River, roughly six Kilometers East from that river's confluence with the White Nile.

== Demographics ==
Together with nearby Ame and Atepi, Aswa belonged to the group of camps widely known as "Triple-A". Aswa was the last of the camps in the region to remain open so it received an estimated 10,000 people who fled government air and ground assaults on the other camps. The SSRA finally evacuated Aswa's population of roughly 37,000 eastwards to Mongali in early February 1994.
