= Achwa 2 Hydroelectric Power Station =

- Map of Uganda showing the location of Achwa 2 HEP Station.
- Country: Uganda
- Location: Achwa River, Gulu District
- Coordinates: 03°08′55″N 32°31′06″E
- Purpose: Power
- Status: Operational
- Opening date: 2019

Dam and spillways
- Impounds: Achwa River

Power Station
- Turbines: 4 x 10.25MW
- Installed capacity: 41 MW (55,000 hp)

Achwa 2 Hydroelectric Power Station is a 41 megawatts (55,000 hp) hydroelectric power plant, in Uganda.

== Location ==
The power station is located across the Achwa River, in Gulu District, Northern Uganda. This location is at the border between Gulu District and Pader District, approximately 38 kilometres (24 mi) north of the settlement of Aswa. This is approximately 50 kilometres (31 mi), by road, northeast of Gulu, the largest city in Northern Uganda. The geographical coordinates of the power station are: 03°08'55.0"N, 32°31'06.0"E (Latitude:3.148611; Longitude:32.518333).

== Overview ==
This power station is one in a cascade of five power stations planned on the Achwa River totaling 109 megawatts (146,000 hp), with Achwa 2 being the first to be built. Achwa 2 is a run-of-the-river hydroelectricity project with planned annual output of 281 GWh.

The power generated will be evacuated via a 132kV high voltage transmission line to a substation in Lira, a distance of approximately 140 kilometres (87 mi), where it will be sold to the Uganda Electricity Transmission Company Limited ("UETCL"). Other infrastructure that will be constructed include 9 kilometres (6 mi) of service roads, a 38 kilometres (24 mi) road to connect the site to the Gulu-Kitgum Road and a camp for the construction workers.

== Ownership and funding ==
The power station is owned and being developed by ARPE Limited. The cost of construction is budgeted at US$78,808,400, of which the African Development Bank lent US$14,330,754 and the remaining US$64,477,646 was borrowed from Delta and other sources. PAC SpA, an Italian construction company, is the EPC contractor for civil works and Voith, a German manufacturer has been contracted to supply the four turbines and associated electro-mechanical parts. The contract includes design, manufacturing, supply, transportation, erection, testing and commissioning of all supplied equipment.

The sources of funding for this project are as illustrated in the table below:

Sources of Funding for Achwa 2 Hydroelectric Power Station
Rank	Funding Source	Amount (US$)	Percentage
1	Delta	56,955,541	72.27
2	African Development Bank	14,330,754	18.18
3	Co-financier	7,522,105	9.55
	Total	78,808,400	100.00

== Completion ==
As of January 2020, the power station was fully constructed. However, only 12 megawatts of the capacity 42 megawatts available was being evacuated via a 33kV power line to Kitgum and Layibi, a suburb in the city of Gulu. The planned development involves construction of a 132kV high voltage transmission line by Uganda Electricity Transmission Company Limited (UETCL), to its substation in Lira. However, disagreements over land compensation for the transmission line delayed construction. The majority of disagreements have been resolved and construction is expected to resume in 2020. The government of Uganda is expected to pay a capacity charge for the 30 megawatts of unused electricity, until the evacuation line is commissioned.

In an interview given in March 2022, the managing director/CEO of Uganda Electricity Transmission Company Limited (UETCL), the government parastatal responsible for evacuating the power from this power station indicated that the 132kV evacuation line and associated substation are expected to be ready during the first quarter of 2023.

== See also ==
- Achwa 1 Hydroelectric Power Station
- List of power stations in Uganda
