= Achwa 1 Hydroelectric Power Station =

- Map of Uganda showing the location of Achwa 1 HEP Station.
- Country: Uganda
- Location: Achwa River, Gulu District
- Coordinates: 03°08′53″N 32°30′51″E
- Status: Operational
- Construction began: 2019
- Opening date: 2021

Dam and spillways
- Impounds: Achwa River

Power Station
- Turbines: 4 x 10.25MW
- Installed capacity: 41 MW (55,000 hp)

The Achwa 1 Hydroelectric Power Station (A1HPS), also Achwa I Hydroelectric Power Station, is a hydroelectric power station in Uganda, with a planned installed capacity of 41 megawatts (55,000 hp).

== Location ==
The facility is located across the Achwa River, in Gulu District, Northern Uganda. This location is at the border between Gulu District and Pader District, approximately 38 kilometres (24 mi) north of the settlement of Aswa. This location is within close proximity of the Achwa 2 Hydroelectric Power Station.

This is approximately 65 kilometres (40 mi), by road, northeast of Gulu, the largest city in Northern Uganda.

== Overview ==
Achwa 1 is a run-of-the-river hydroelectricity project with planned annual output of 274 GWh. This power station is one in a cascade of five power stations planned on the Achwa River totaling 109 megawatts (146,000 hp). The power generated will be sold to the Uganda Electricity Transmission Company Limited, for integration into the national electricity grid.

== Construction ==
The power generated will be evacuated via the Lira–Gulu–Agago High Voltage Power Line, a 132kV high voltage transmission line, to a substation in Lira, a distance of approximately 140 kilometres (87 mi), where it will be sold to the Uganda Electricity Transmission Company Limited (“UETCL”). Other infrastructure that will be constructed include 9 kilometres (6 mi) of service roads, a 38 kilometres (24 mi) service road to connect the site to the Gulu-Kitgum Road and a camp for the construction workers.

In 2016, solicitation for bids to carry out feasibility and environmental impact assessments for this power station, were advertised. The development rights are owned by Berkeley Energy, through its wholly owned Ugandan subsidiary, Maji Power Limited.

Works were ongoing as of January 2020.

== See also ==
- List of power stations in Uganda
- Energy in Uganda
