= Wau River =

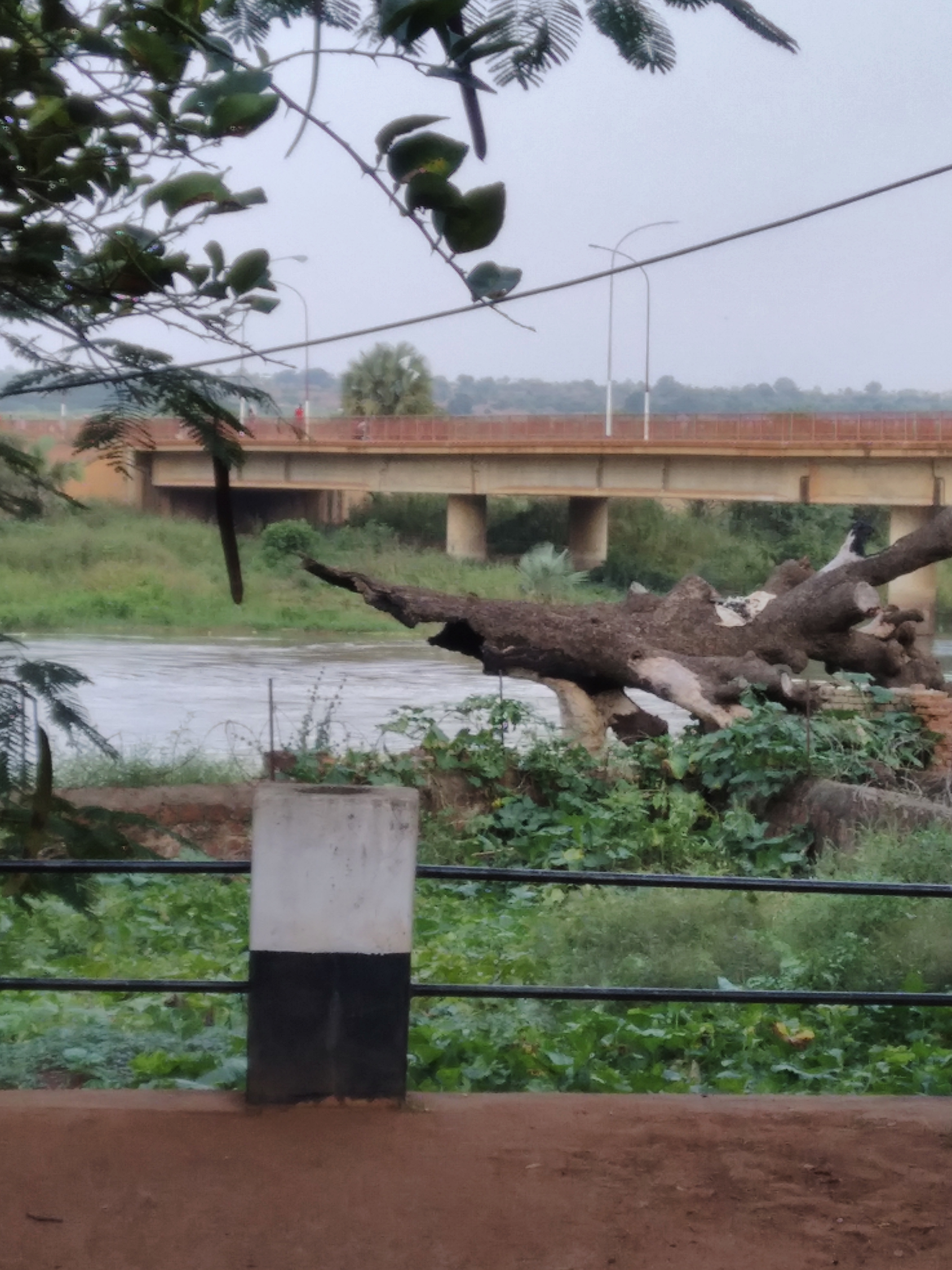

- Location of mouth in South Sudan

Location
- Country: South Sudan

Physical characteristics
- Mouth
  - coordinates: 7.05°N 27.2167°E

The Wau River, or Wau Nahr (sometimes spelled Waw or Wow), is a river in South Sudan. It shares its name with Wau, the state capital of Western Bahr el Ghazal, where the river is located east of the international border with the Central African Republic.

== See also ==
- List of rivers of South Sudan
