= Pongo River (South Sudan) =

- Location within South Sudan

Location
- Country: South Sudan
- State: Western Bahr el Ghazal

Physical characteristics
- Source
  - coordinates: 7.0314°N 26.6913°E
- Mouth: Lol River
  - coordinates: 8.9422°N 28.1498°E

The Pongo River is a stream in the South Sudanese state of Northern Bahr el Ghazal. It is a right tributary of the Lol River.

== Course ==
The Pongo rises in the south of Western Bahr el Ghazal. It flows in a north northeast direction into Western Bahr el Ghazal, and passes to the east of Malek Alei. The river branches, with one branch flowing north to join the Lol River around 8.8619°N 27.6178°E while the longer main branch flows northeast and then east to the south of Akon before turning northeast to join the Lol River.

== See also ==
- List of rivers of South Sudan
