= Kongkong River =

- Location of mouth in South Sudan

Location
- Country: South Sudan

Physical characteristics
- Mouth
  - coordinates: 7.43333°N 33.2333°E

The Kongkong River, also spelled Kong Kong, is a stream in the South Sudanese state of Jonglei, west of Boma National Park near the Ethiopian border. At the village of Bongak it joins the Abara River to form the Agwei or Agvey River, a tributary of the Pibor River. The Kongkong is within the drainage basin of the White Nile.
