= Kidepo River =

River in the Uganda and South Sudan

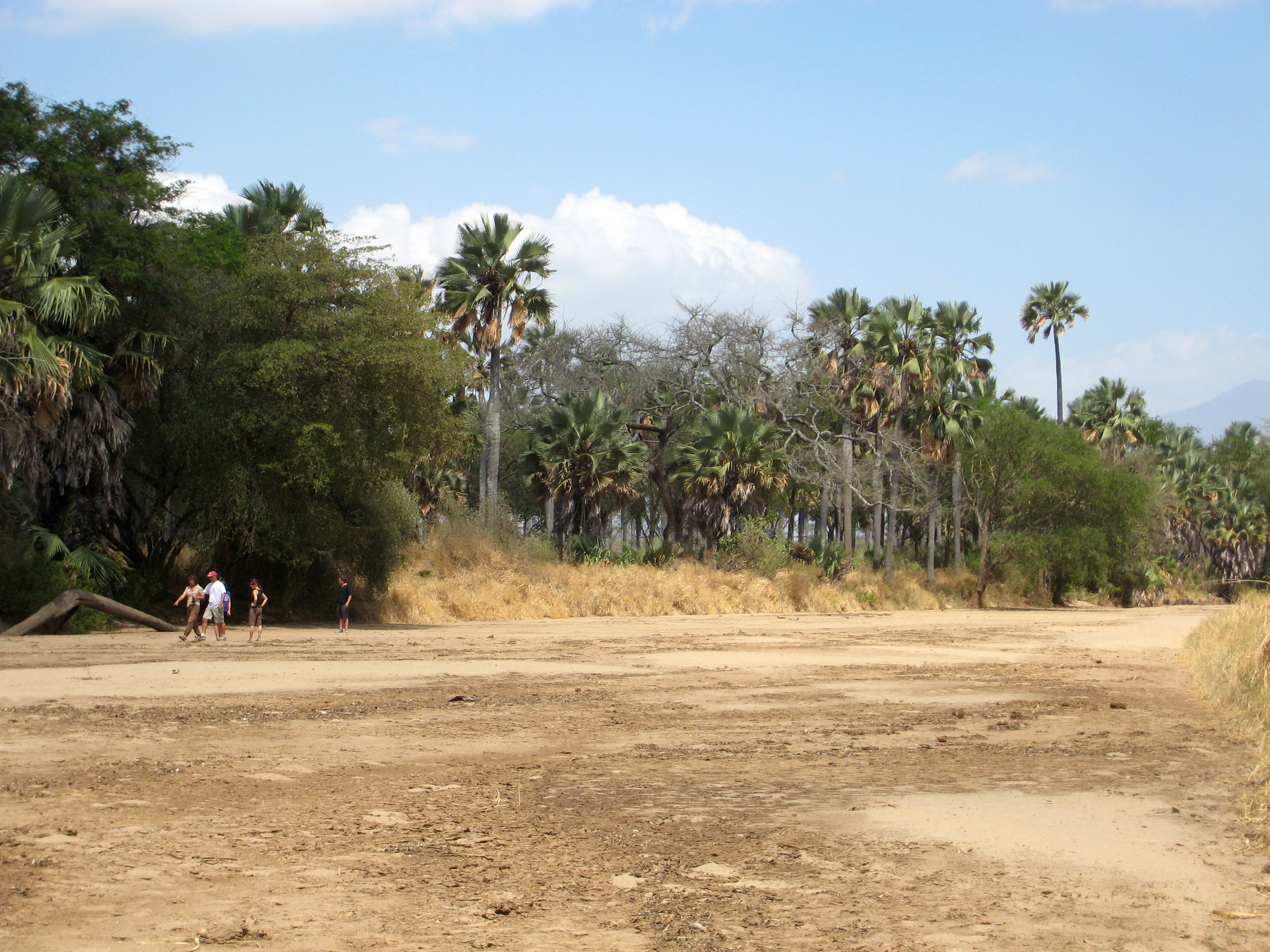

- Etymology: "to pick" in Karamajong

Location
- Country: Uganda, South Sudan

Physical characteristics
- Source: Napore–Nyangea Hills and the Morungole and Zulia ranges
  - location: Kaabong District, Uganda
  - coordinates: 3°54′4″N 34°0′42″E
  - elevation: 1,300 m (4,300 ft)
- Mouth: White Nile
  - location: South Sudan
  - coordinates: 4°52′6.348″N 33°8′14.280″E
- Discharge
  - minimum: 0 m^{3}/s (0 cu ft/s)

Basin features
- River system: White Nile (Nile basin)
- Tributaries
  - right: Narus River

The Kidepo River is a seasonal river along the Kidepo Valley in the Karamoja region of Uganda, and in East Equatoria area of South Sudan. The river gives its name to the Kidepo Valley National Park, which it runs through.

== Course ==
Headwaters in the far north-east of Uganda are linked to the Napore–Nyangea Hills and the Morungole and Zulia mountain ranges, which are noted sources for rivers in the Karamoja region, including the Kidepo system. The river runs through the Kidepo Valley area (including Kidepo Valley National Park) before crossing into South Sudan. In the broader Kidepo–Narus river system, the Kidepo and Narus rivers are described as flowing roughly north and converging in Sudan (now South Sudan), ultimately draining toward the Nile system.

== Geography ==
The Kidepo River drains part of the semi-arid landscap of northern Uganda and southern South Sudan. Its upper catchment lies within the Karamoja sub-region, where runoff from the Napore-Nyangea Hills and the Morungole and Zulia mountain ranges contributes to seasonal river flow. The river traverses the Kidepo Valley, one of the principal landscape features of Kidepo Valley National Game Park, before crossing into South Sudan. The surrounding landscape is characterized by open savanna, seasonal wetlands, riverine vegetation, and isolated mountain ranges that influence local hydrology and biodiversity.

== Hydrology and seasonality ==
In Kidepo Valley National Park, the rivers Kidepo and Narus are described as seasonal “sand rivers” that flow briefly after heavy rains, with the Kidepo Valley and its tributaries being dry for much of the year. Water persistence during dry months is reported mainly as remnant pools (especially along the Narus), which wildlife use when surface flow is absent.

An external description of the river system in the Kidepo area characterises the Kidepo as an ephemeral river prone to flash flooding, draining through an arid valley environment. The Uganda Wildlife Authority information for Kidepo Valley National Park reports a semi-arid climate and provides indicative rainfall differences between the Narus valley (about 890 mm per year) and the Kidepo valley (about 635 mm per year).

== Kidepo Basin ==
A wetlands governance profile for South Sudan describes the “Kidepo Basin” as extending through Lamwo, Kitgum, and Kaabong districts and draining into the White Nile in South Sudan through the Kidepo and Narus rivers. The same source notes a semi-arid setting, with seasonal wetlands reported along the Lamwo–Kitgum district border and in parts of Kaabong District in the upper reaches of the Kidepo River.

== Ecology and protected areas ==
The Kidepo–Narus valley system supports river-associated habitats within Kidepo Valley National Park. Uganda Wildlife Authority materials describe dry-season dependence on remaining pools and highlight contrasts between the drier Kidepo Valley and the more reliable water conditions associated with the Narus area.

Within the park’s broader landscape, Borassus palms are described as a common feature along rivers including the Kidepo and Narus.

== Conservation ==
Much of the upper course of the Kidepo river lies within Kidepo Valley National Game Park, a protected area managed by the Uganda Wildlife Authority. The river and its associated habitats contribute to the ecological integrity of the Kidepo-Narus ecosystem, supporting wildlife populations and riverine vegetation communities. Seasonal pools remaining after river flow ceases provide important dry-season water sources for wildlife within the Park.

The conservation of riverine habitats is therefore considered an important component of broader ecosystem management in the protected area.

== See also ==
- Kidepo Valley National Park
- List of rivers of Uganda
- List of rivers of South Sudan
- Narus River
