= Kangen River =

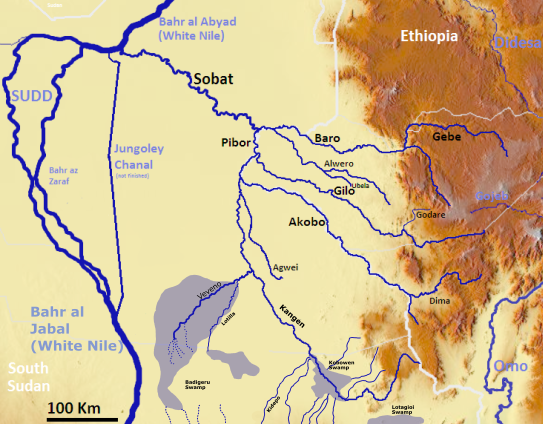
- Sobat River basin

- Location of mouth in South Sudan

Location
- Country: South Sudan

Physical characteristics
- Mouth
  - coordinates: 6.78333°N 33.15°E

The Kangen River is a river in South Sudan, just west of Boma National Park. It joins the Pibor River near Pibor.

== See also ==
- List of rivers of South Sudan
