= Agwei River =

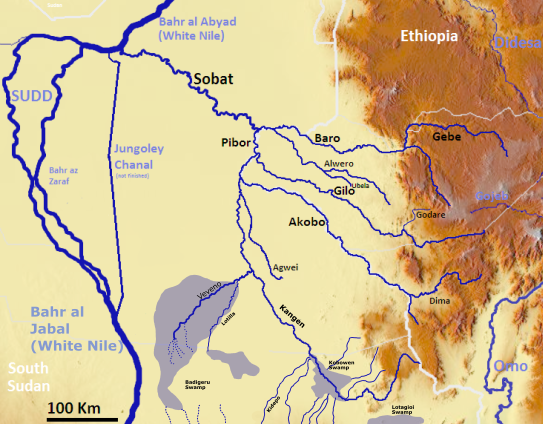
- Sobat River basin

- Location of mouth in South Sudan

Location
- Countries: South Sudan

Physical characteristics
- Mouth
  - coordinates: 7.8°N 33.05°E

Basin features
- River system: Pibor River

The Agwei River or the River Agwei, also spelled Agvey, is a tributary of the Pibor River that flows through eastern South Sudan. Its own tributaries include the Abara and Kongkong rivers. The river is a wadi, or ravine, that may run dry during the dry season but quickly becomes a watercourse due to heavy rainfall during the wet season.
