= Yal (boat) =

Lightweight naval vessel

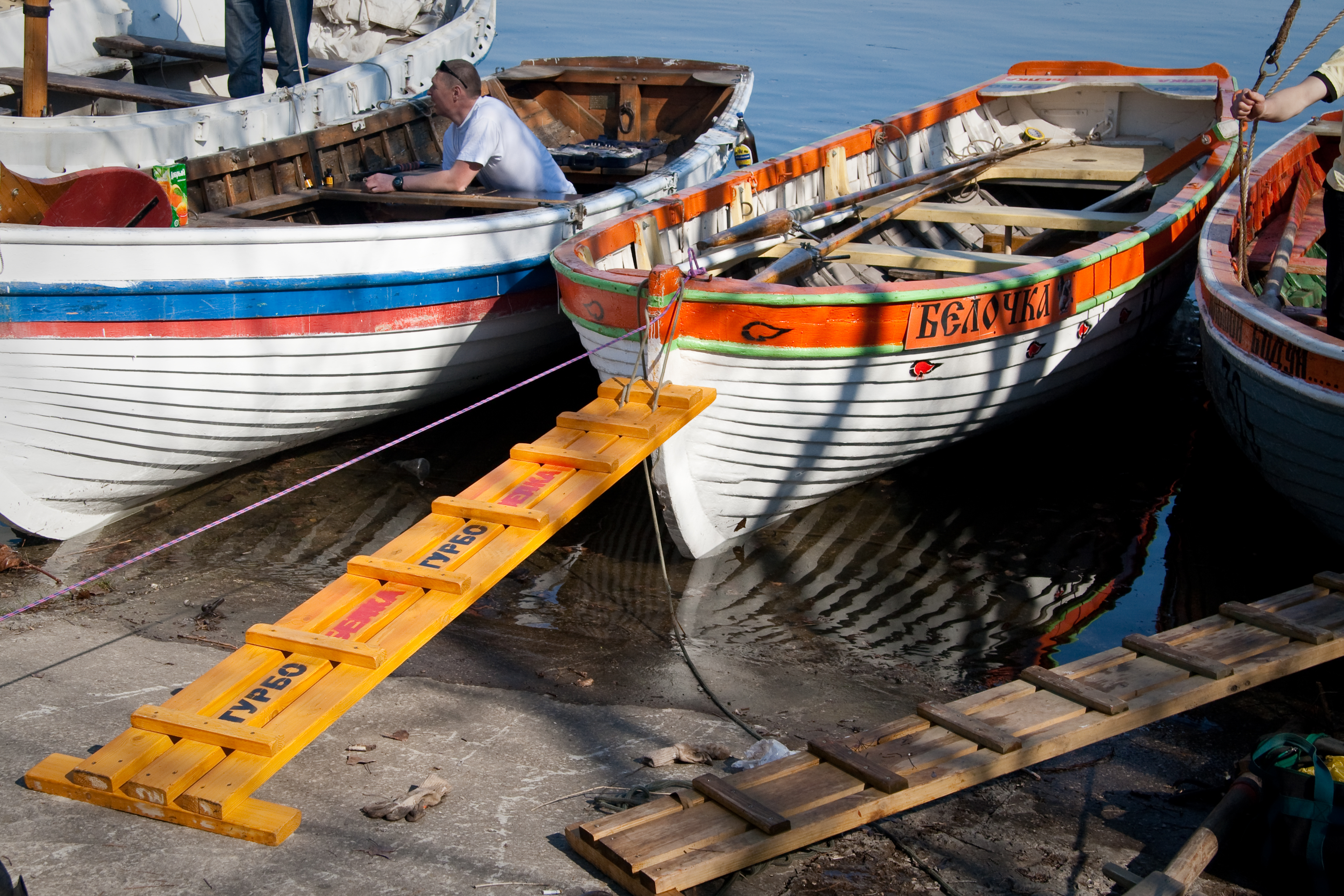
Russian wooden planked hull yals, model "Yal-4"

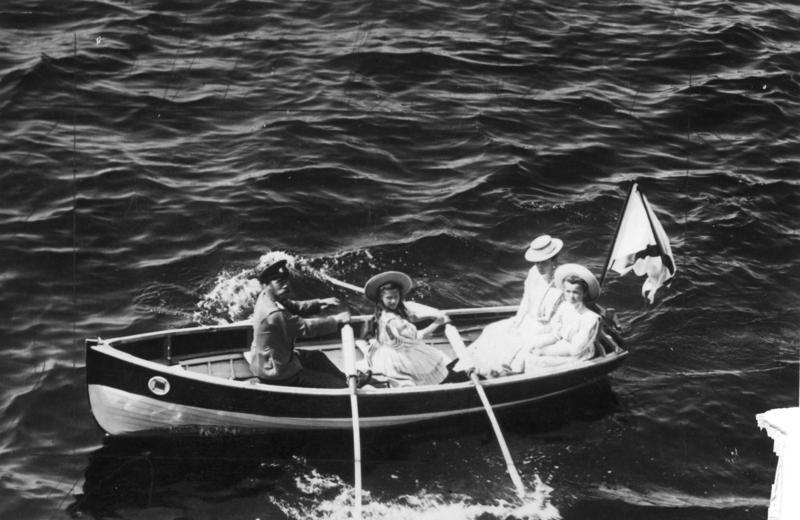
Russian Tsar and his family retreat in a "Yal-4" (4 oars)

Yal (from Dutch: jol to Russian: ял) – Russian and Soviet Naval transom stern light weight rowing-boat with one removable mast and set with the sail. A small yal is sometimes called a yalik, the diminutive form of yal.

Yals were used as life-boats, mooring boats, boat for kedge operations, supply boats, boat for works alongside the ship (painting, etc.), boat for communication with the shore and for personnel transportation, small fishing boats since the 19th century.

Yals are popular for sport and tourism purposes also.

The six-oar, four-oar and two-oar yals have one mast used to support two quadrilateral standing split-lug sails. Wooden yals are constructed of oak keels, stem and stern posts, ash thwarts and gratings, and pine or laminated glued spruce strakes.

Types of yals according to the materials used for the manufacture of distinguished, the last digit means the maximum quantity of oars:

- Wooden – ЯЛ-6, ЯЛ-4, ЯЛ-2
- Veneer – ЯЛШ-6, ЯЛШ-4, ЯЛШ-2
- Plastic – ЯЛП-6
- Alloy – ЯЛА-6

== Two-oar yal ==
Length – 3.55 m

Width – 1.25 m

The two-oars yal is rigged with a split-lug sail and is able to carry up to three people for short distances in sea conditions up to 2 points on the Beaufort scale.

== Four-oar yal ==
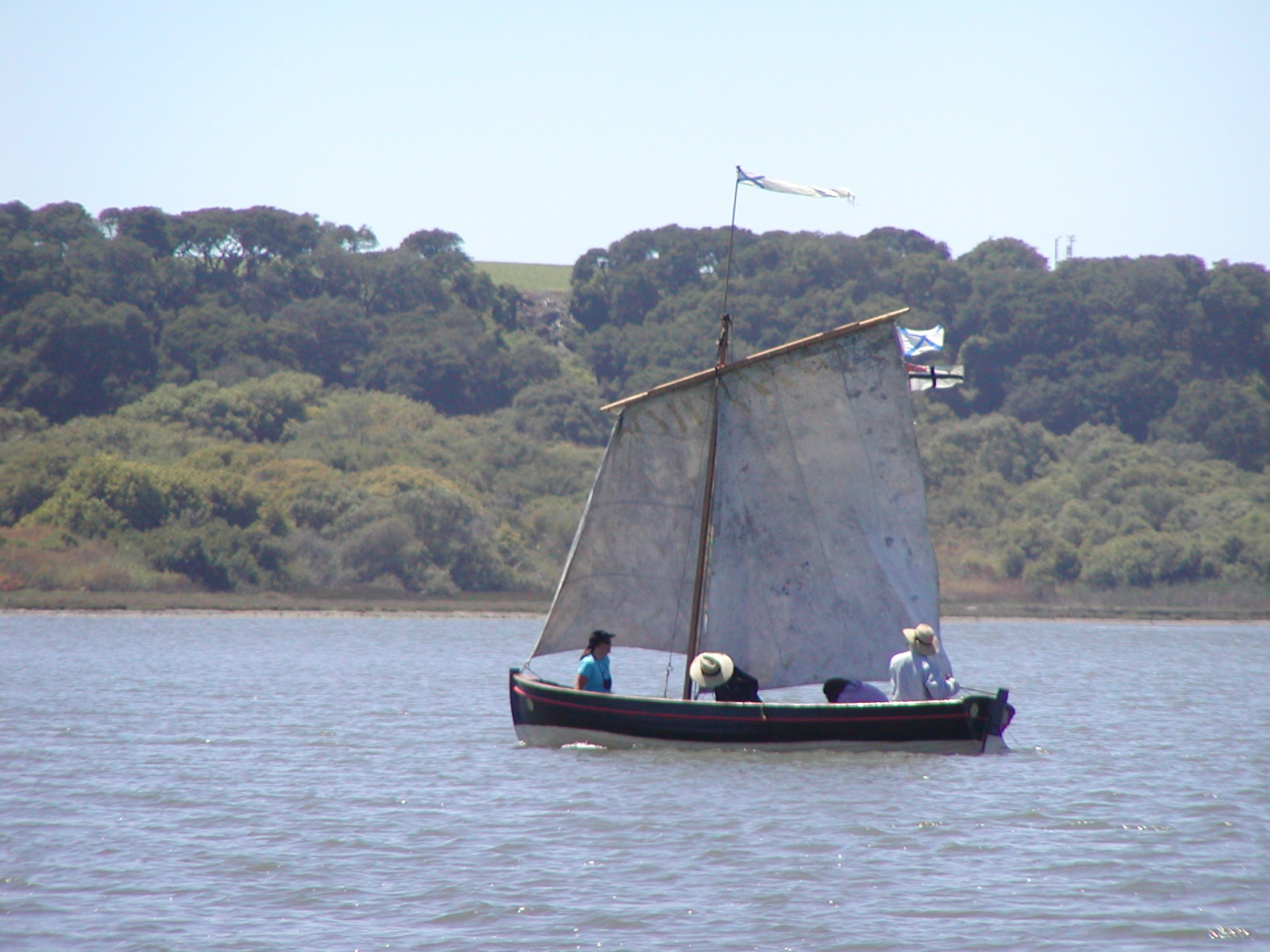
Four-oared yal of Boat-Base Monterey sailing in Moss Landing, California, 2002

Length – 5.26 m

Width – 1.61 m

This yal is able to carry up to eight people.

The four-oared yal is rigged with a split-lug sail on a single mast, and sometimes can be supplied with outboard motor. Often referred to as a "gig" (gichka in Russian). Able to transport light goods or people.

== Six-oar yal ==
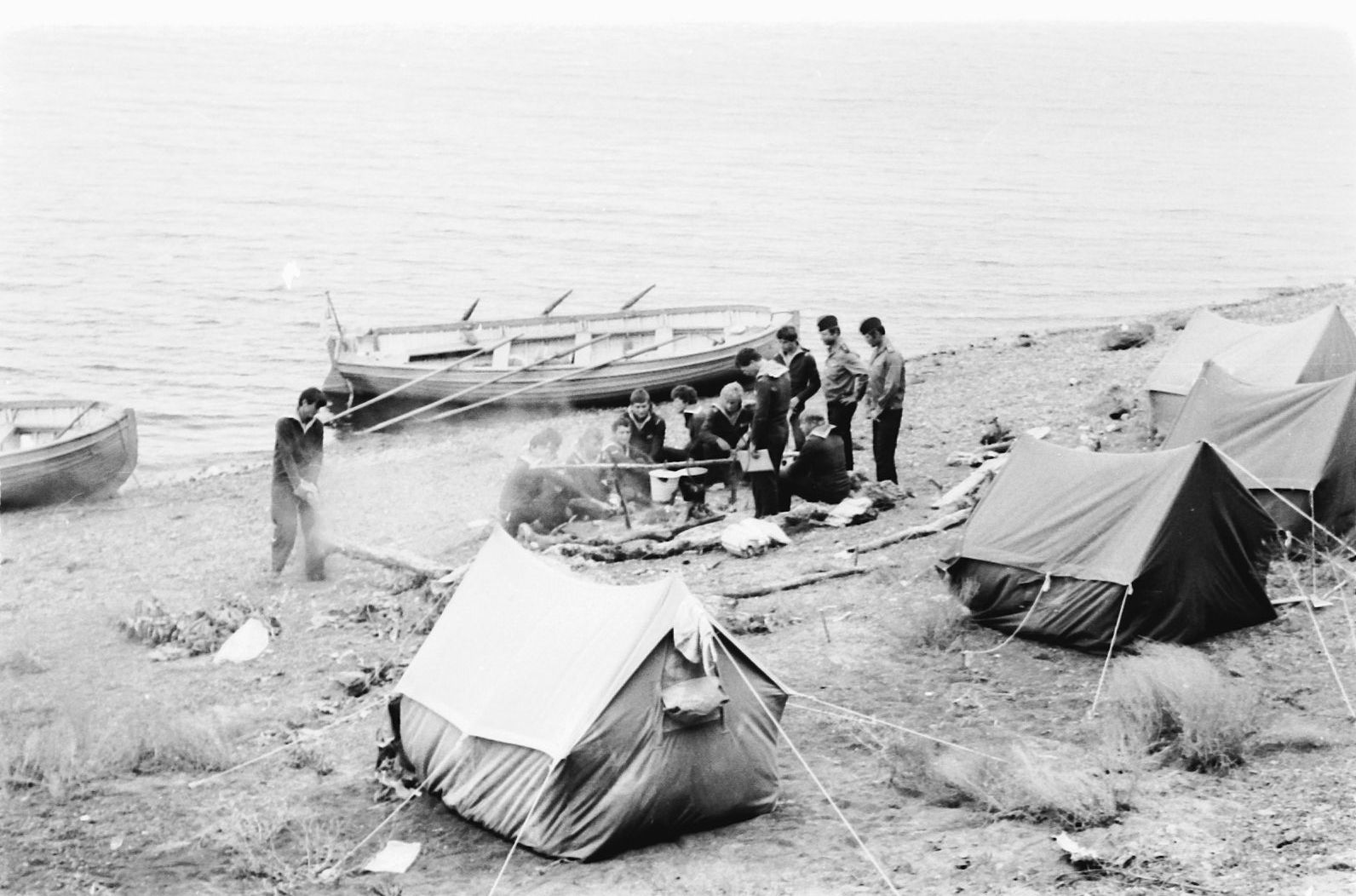
"Yal-6", six-oars yal, on the shore of lake Bolon

Length – 6.11 m

Width – 1.85 m

Maximum persons on board if winds not more than 5 points as per Beaufort scale, in areas closed from the waves:

- Under oars – 13 persons
- Under sail – 8 persons in case weather not more than 5–6 per Boufort scale

Yal-6 or six-oar yal – seaworthy boat is rigged with a split-lug sail on a single mast. Originally the yal-6 was made of wood, but since the late 1990s more commonly made of plastic. Propelled with oars, sails or outboard motor.

This yal has the following parameters: length – 6,11 m, width – 1,85 m, height from keel to gunwale (amidships) – 0.91 m, weight 600–650 kg (wooden), 450–500 kg (plastic).

== Books ==
- "Военно-морской словарь" ("Original Naval Dictionary"), page 196, Authors – Chief editorial office of the leaders of the USSR and the Russian Navy, Commander of the Navy Admiral Tchernavin V.N., ISBN 5-203-00174-X, total pages 511, Year 1989, Publisher – Воениздат, Moscow.
- "Учись морскому делу" ("Learn seamanship"), page 141, Authors – Bagryantsev B.I., Rechetov P.I., Total pages 175, Year 1986, 2nd supplemented edition, Publisher – ДОСААФ, Moscow.

== See also ==
- Rowing boat
- Yawl
