= Medikiret River =

- Location of mouth in South Sudan

Location
- Countries: South Sudan, Ethiopia

Physical characteristics
- Mouth
  - coordinates: 5.2°N 32.7333°E

The Medikiret River, also known as simply Medikiret or the Mediket, is a wadi, or narrow ravine that becomes a watercourse during the wet season, in South Sudan. It feeds into marshes in Bandingilo National Park in Eastern Equatoria and Jonglei states from the south, meeting the marshes almost due north of Torit and about 238 kilometers north-north-east of Juba, the South Sudanese national capital.

== See also ==
- List of rivers of South Sudan
