= Aswa-Lolim Game Reserve =

Wildlife reserve in northern Uganda

- Aswa-Lolim Wildlife Reserve
- IUCN category IV (habitat/species management area)
- Location within Uganda
- Coordinates: 2°43′N 31°35′E

The Aswa-Lolim Game Reserve was a wildlife reserve in northern Uganda. It was degazetted in 1972.

The reserve was located just north of Murchison Falls National Park and provided a dispersal and migration area for ungulates including elephants.

In 2010 the Uganda Wildlife Authority gave a concession to a private group known as the Aswa-Lolim Wildlife Association to manage the important wildlife migration route in the area.
