= Pibor River =

River in South Sudan and Ethiopia

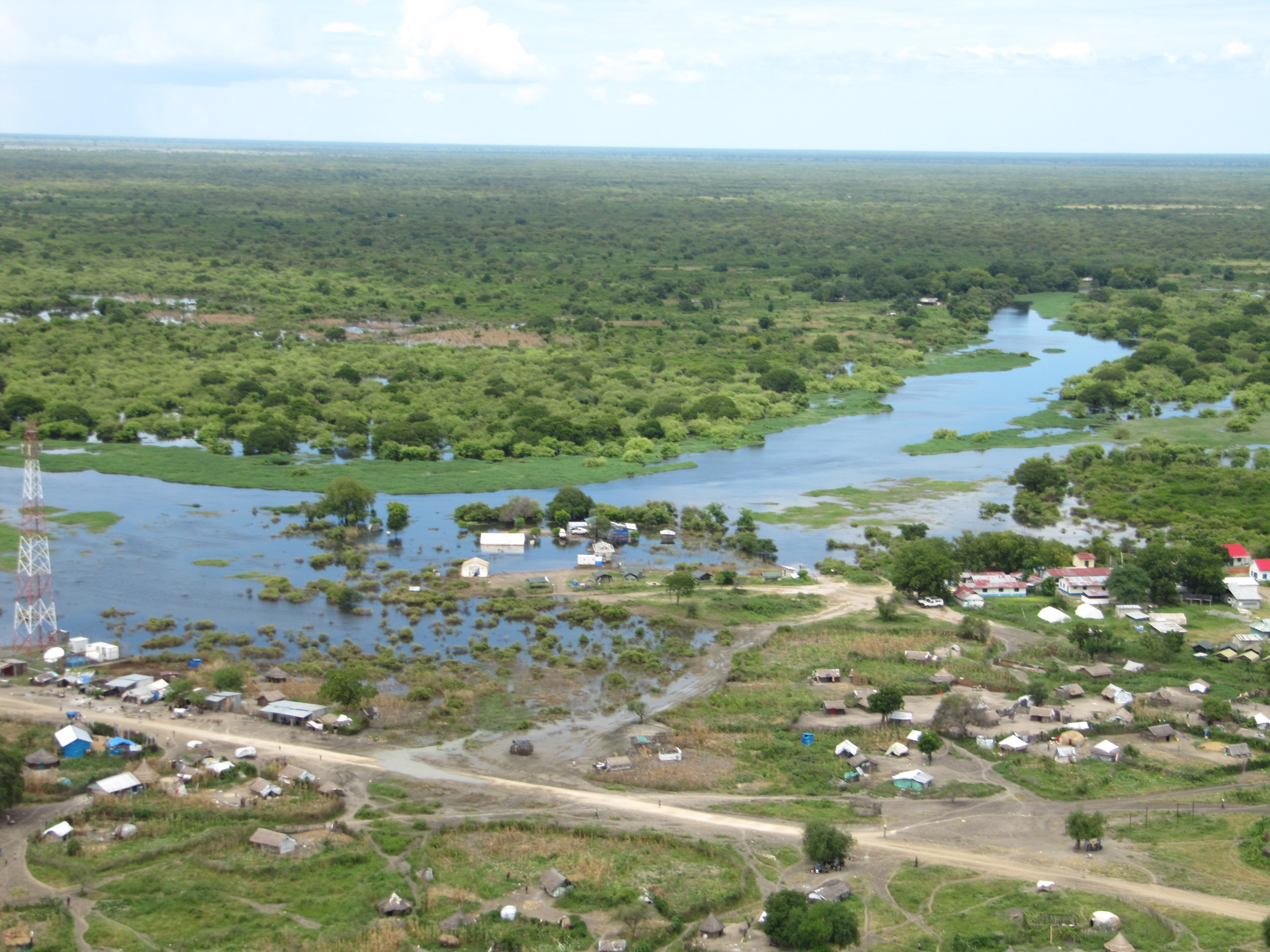
- Pibor at Pibor Post

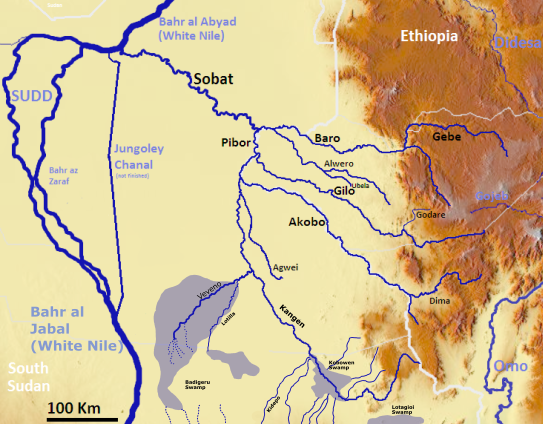
- Map of the Sobat River basin, showing the Pibor

- Location of mouth in South Sudan

Location
- Countries: South Sudan; Ethiopia

Physical characteristics
- Source: Pibor River
  - location: Pibor Post, Greater Pibor
  - coordinates: 6°47′42″N 33°09′07″E
  - elevation: 418 m (1,371 ft)
- Mouth: Sobat River
  - location: Jikmir, South Sudan
  - coordinates: 8°26′01″N 33°13′07″E
  - elevation: 404 m (1,325 ft)
- Length: 320 km (200 mi)
- Basin size: 137,130 km^{2} (52,950 sq mi)
- Discharge
  - location: Mouth
  - average: 186.3 m^{3}/s (6,580 cu ft/s)
  - minimum: 102.1 m^{3}/s (3,610 cu ft/s)
  - maximum: 348.1 m^{3}/s (12,290 cu ft/s)

Basin features
- Progression: Sobat River → White Nile → Nile → Mediterranean Sea
- River system: Nile
- Population: 3,100,000
- Tributaries
  - left: Lotilla
  - right: Kangen, Agwei, Akobo, Gilo

The Pibor River (also called the River Pibor) is a river in eastern South Sudan, which defines part of South Sudan's border with Ethiopia. From its source near Pibor Post it flows north for about 320 kilometres (200 mi), joining the Baro River to form the Sobat River, which is a tributary of the White Nile.

The Pibor and its tributaries drain a watershed 137,130 km^{2} (52,950 sq mi) in size. The river's mean annual discharge at its mouth is 186.3 m^{3}/s (6,580 cu ft/s).

== Course ==
The Pibor River is formed by various streams that come together at Pibor Post, a colonial era outpost built in 1912 and originally called Fort Bruce. The Pibor flows north, receiving the Akobo River near Akobo. Continuing north the Pibor receives the Gilo River and Bela Rivers on the right, then joins the Baro River, forming the Sobat River.

== Natural history ==
The Pibor, Baro, Gilo, and Akobo rivers all drain the Ethiopian Highlands. The Baro River is by far the largest, contributing 83% of the total water flowing into the Sobat River. During the rainy season, between June and October, the Baro River alone contributes about 10% of the Nile's water at Aswan, Egypt. In contrast, these rivers have very low flow during the dry season.

== History ==
The boundary between Sudan and Ethiopia was defined for the region near the Pibor River in 1899 by Major H.H. Austin and Major Charles W. Gwynn of the British Royal Engineers. They had no knowledge of the land, its inhabitants, or their languages, and were short on supplies. Rather than defining a line based on ethnic groups and traditional territories, essentially along the escarpment that separates the Ethiopian Highlands and the plains of the Sudanian Savanna, they simply proposed a line drawn down the middle of the Akobo River and parts of the Pibor and Baro rivers. This boundary was consummated in the Anglo-Ethiopian Treaty of 1902, resulting in an area in Ethiopian Gambela Region called the Baro Salient. This area is more closely connected to South Sudan than Ethiopia, both in terms of natural features and people. The Baro Salient was used as a sanctuary by Sudanese insurgents during the country's long civil wars. It was difficult for Sudan to exert authority over a region that is part of Ethiopia, and Ethiopia was reluctant to police this remote region and become involved in the politics of Sudan's internal conflicts.

== See also ==
- List of rivers of South Sudan
- List of rivers of Ethiopia
