= Jikmir, South Sudan =

Jikmir, Nasir County
- Interactive map of Jikmir, Nasir County
- Coordinates: 8.455766°N 33.18813°E
- Country: South Sudan
- Region: Greater Upper Nile
- State: Upper Nile State
- County: Nasir County

Population (2022)
  - Total: 50,000

Jikmir is a Payam within Nasir County of Upper Nile State in the Greater Upper Nile region of South Sudan. The main town in Jikmir Payam is Jikmir, with a population of approximately 10,000 to 20,000. The town is located 15 miles west of the Ethiopian border, Gambella Region. Jikmir Payam expands from the town of Kierwan to most western to the Ethiopian border town of Burebiey across the Sobat River. The ethnicity of people in Jikmir is a predominantly Nuer ethnic group who speak Nuer or Thoknath. Jikmir development strategy serves as replicable model for transitioning villages to towns. Jikmir Model emphasizes the need for local leaders and population to take ownership of their own developmental initiatives, such as establishing local police, town administration structure, and localized taxation system. The town continue to attract diverse population across the country in search fo safety, education, and stability. Jikmir experience yearly flooding due to town being in lowland and surrounded by swamps.

== Sports ==
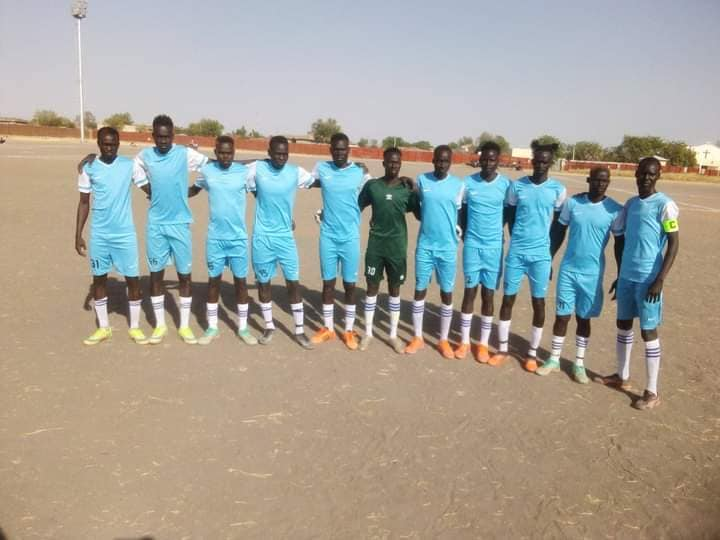
Jikmir Footbal Club

Jikmir Football Club (JFC) also called Jikmir Joklech is one of football club in Nasir County. Jikmir Joklec won 2021 and 2022 County cup where they represented Nasir County in State tournament. Jikmir Joklec continue to be the provide of the town as they continue to dominate opponents on the field. Jikmir Joklec represent traditional pride of Jikmirians. The local always support them when they're playing at home and welcome them with parade when they play with other teams in away games. Rival teams for Jikmir Joklec include Torkech Footbal Club, Wanding Football Club, Mandeng Football Club, and Nasir Football Club.

== History ==
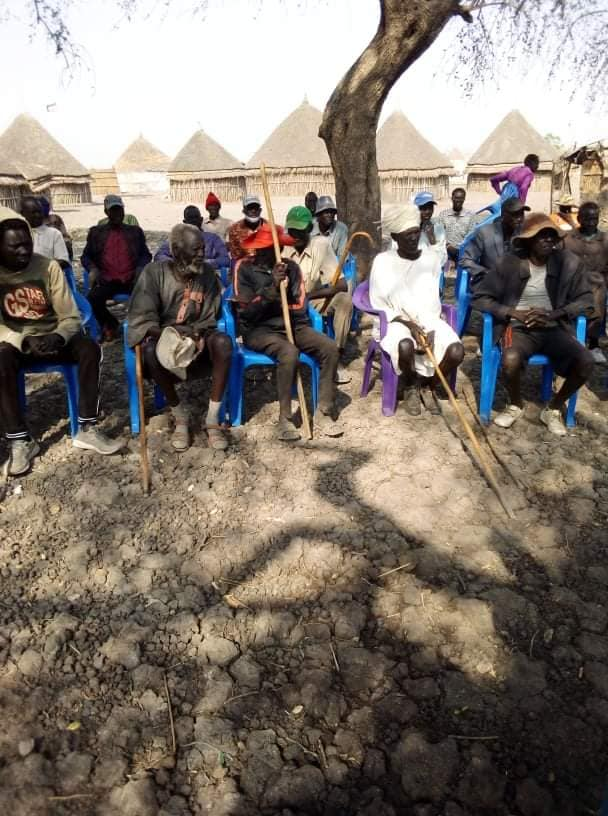
Town Chiefs

During the Sudan Civil War from 1983 to 2005, Jikmir served as the primary military town for SPLA soldiers as they battled the Khartoum government in Nasir. From 1983 to 1989, Jikmir hosted key senior SPLA officers such as CDR William Nyuon Bany, CDR Koang Chuol Kulang, and CDR Steven Duol Chuol Lual until the fall of Nasir town in 1989. Jikmir was used a SPLA Garrison town as the rebel continue launch operation into Nasir.

During South Sudan Civil War of 2013–Present, Jikmir serves as major city for internally displaced persons(IDPs) around Nasir county. The town continue to take in refugees from the surrounding villages as they seek security from the established local police and leadership administration. As a result of hosting internal displace people, Jikmir has experience multiple bombartment as military operations.

== Notable people from Jikmir ==
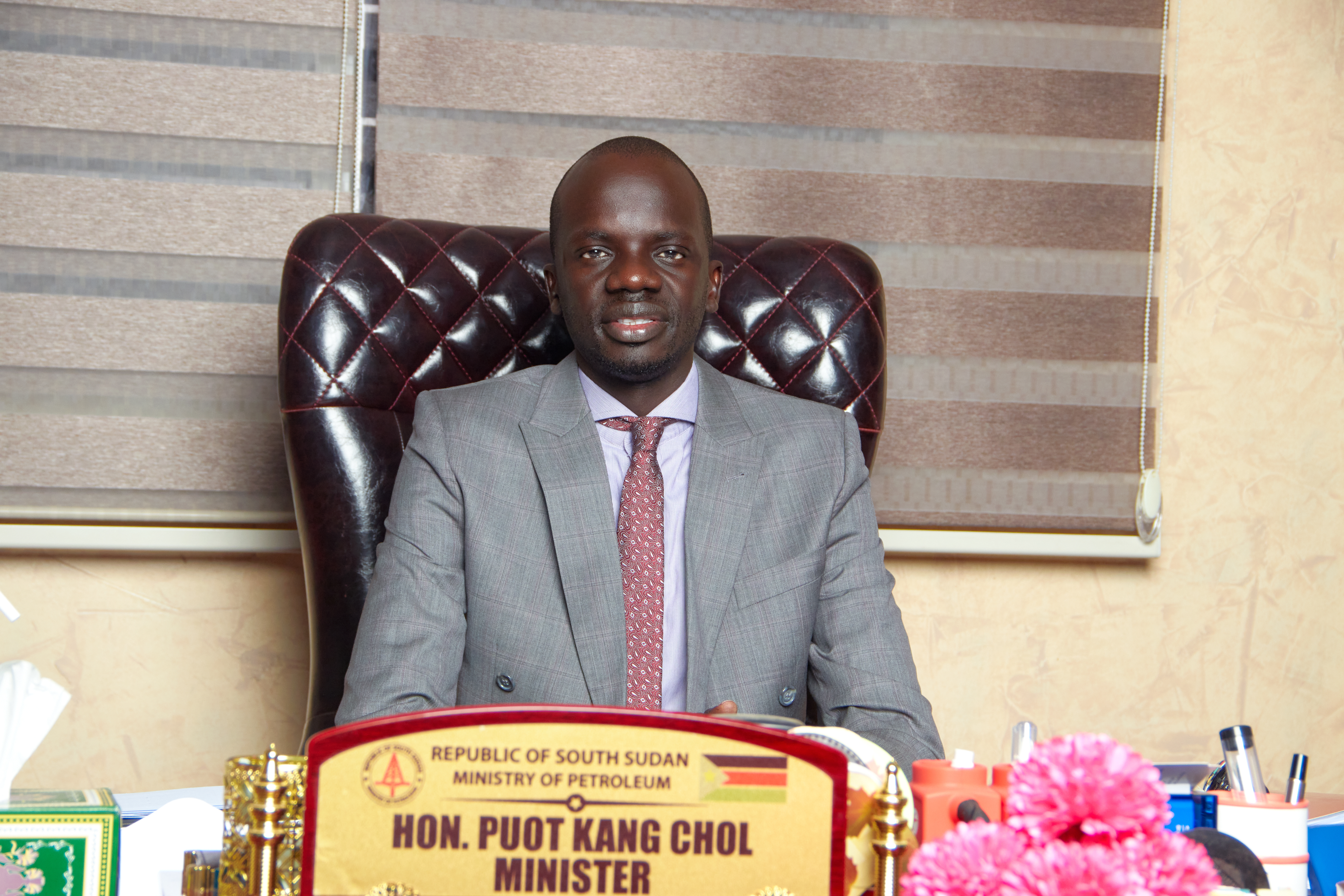
Hon. Puot Kang Chol, SSD Minister of Petroleum

Prominent leaders from Jikmir include Hon. Puot Kang Chuol (National Minister of Petroleum, South Sudan), Gen. Koang Chuol Ranley (Governor, Upper Nile), Hon. Pal Ruach Duop (Deputy Speaker of Upper Nile State Transitional Legislative Assembly), Ato. Bagual Jock (Gambella Town Mayor, Ethiopian); Hon. Mark Chuol Wie (Ethiopia, Politician, late), Hon. Opal Lual Yier (1st Gambella Governor), Gen. Stephen Duol Chuol Lual (SPLA, Late), Gen. Dep Tew Wahr (Upper Nile Police Chief, late). Gen. Pur Nienkel (SPLA, Late), Chuol Jock Wei( Battle Adowa Veteran)

== Governmental structure ==
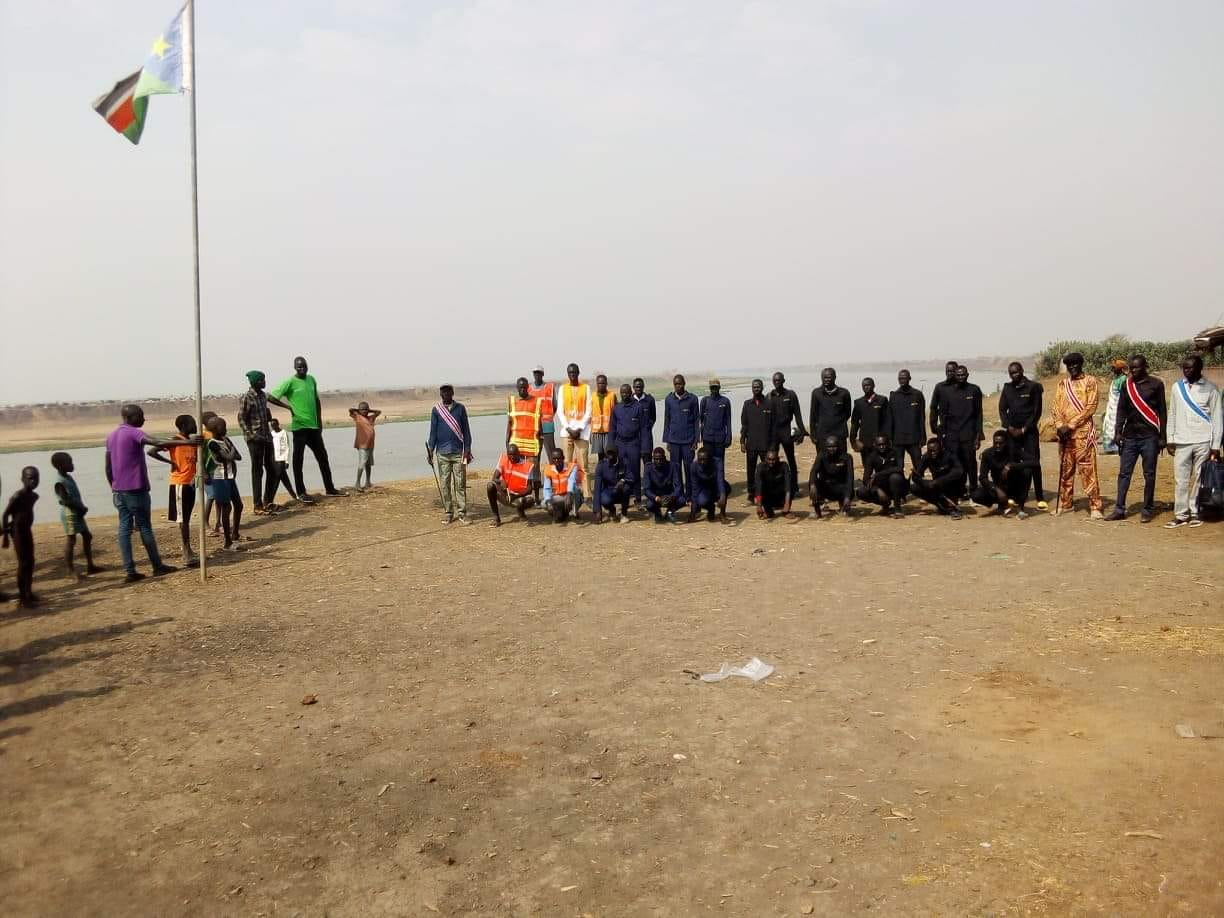
Jikmir Police and administration

The primary governmental body in Jikmir includes Payam leadership, traditional Chiefs, and the town Police Chief. The major institutions in Jikmir are Stephen Duol Primary School, Jikmir Presbyterian Church, and Jikmir Payam Compound.

== Sources ==
- Bol Jock, B. (2022). Jikmir, South Sudan in the late 1970s. Facebook. Retrieved February 5, 2023, from Jikmir, South Sudan in the late 1970s vs Jikmir 2022, Edited by Bol Jok (Nuer History,). For more information please subscribe to my YouTube channel... | By Kim Koang Biel | Facebook
- Bol Jock, B. J. (Ed.). (2022, May 14). Jikmir, South Sudan in the late 1970s vs Jikmir 2022 edited by Bol Jock. YouTube. Retrieved February 5, 2023, from Jikmir, South Sudan in the late 1970s vs Jikmir 2022 edited by Bol Jock
- IRNA Report. (2017, January 2). IRNA report: Jikmir, Nasir County (28-29 January 2017). HumanitarianResponse. Retrieved February 5, 2023, from IRNA Report: Jikmir, Nasir County (28-29 January 2017) | HumanitarianResponse
- Komach Deng, K. K. (Ed.). (2015, December 17). Nasir native in Jikmir. YouTube. Retrieved February 5, 2023, from Nasir Native in Jikmir Video
- Reliefweb. (2017, March 9). South Sudan: NFI and emergency shelter assessment/verification report, Jikmir - WVI, SSUDA, Ada, SSRC15 (February 2017) - south Sudan. ReliefWeb. Retrieved February 5, 2023, from South Sudan: NFI and Emergency Shelter Assessment/Verification Report, Jikmir - WVI, SSUDA, ADA, SSRC15 (February 2017) - South Sudan | ReliefWeb
