= Adar River =

River of South Sudan

- Location of mouth in South Sudan

Location
- Country: South Sudan

Physical characteristics
- Mouth
  - coordinates: 10°23′N 32°15′E

Basin features
- River system: White Nile

The Adar River (or Khor Adar), known to the Dinka as the Yal, is a tributary of the White Nile in the state of Upper Nile, South Sudan. It flows north west from the Machar Marshes and enters the White Nile just upstream of the town of Melut.

== Geography ==
The Adar River drains part of the extensive Machar Marshes, a large wetland complex in eastern South Sudan. The surrounding landscape consists mainly of seasonally flooded grasslands and low-gradient alluvial plains. The river ultimately conveys water from the marshes to the White Nile, contributing to the hydrological functioning of the Upper Nile floodplain.

== Hydrology ==
The Adar River is characterized by a strongly seasonal flow regime. Water levels rise during the rainy season as rainfall and wetland storage increase throughout the Machar Marshes, while discharge decreases during the dry season. This seasonal pattern is typical of tributaries entering the White Nile from the eastern floodplains of South Sudan.

== Ecology ==
The Adar River forms part of the Machar Marshes ecosystem, one of the major wetland regions of the Upper Nile Basin. These wetlands provide habitat for fish, migratory birds and other wildlife while also supporting seasonal grazing and traditional pastoral livelihoods. Although few ecological studies focus specifically on the Adar River, it contributes to the maintenance of wetland habitats within the White Nile basin.

== Scientific documentation ==
Scientific information on the Adar River is limited. Most published knowledge derives from hydrological investigations of the White Nile, the Machar Marshes and the Upper Nile wetlands rather than studies devoted exclusively to the river itself. Consequently, the Adar River is primarily documented as part of the regional hydrological network of eastern South Sudan.

== See also ==
- White Nile
- Machar Marshes
- Nile Basin
- List of rivers of South Sudan
