= Sobat River =

River in South Sudan

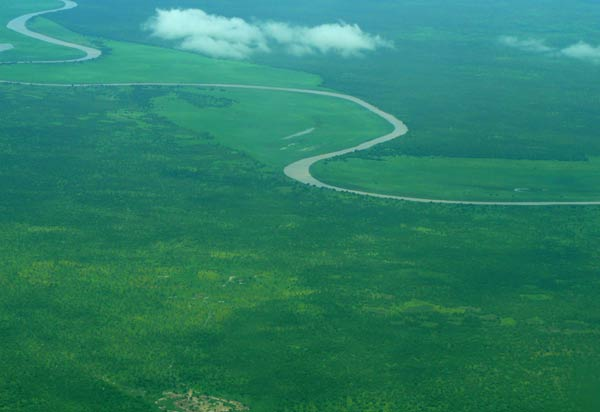
- Sobat River from air

Location
- Country: South Sudan
- State: Upper Nile (state)

Physical characteristics
- Source: Baro River
  - location: Dibdib, Ethiopia
  - coordinates: 7°42′04″N 35°52′44″E
  - elevation: 2,367 m (7,766 ft)
- 2nd source: Pibor River
  - location: Pibor Post, Greater Pibor
  - coordinates: 6°47′42″N 33°09′07″E
  - elevation: 418 m (1,371 ft)
- Source confluence
  - location: Jikmir, South Sudan
  - coordinates: 8°26′10″N 33°13′7″E
  - elevation: 404 m (1,325 ft)
- Mouth: White Nile
  - location: Againg, Upper Nile
  - coordinates: 9°22′2″N 31°32′57″E
  - elevation: 398 m (1,306 ft)
- Length: 354 km (220 mi)
- Basin size: 225,000 km^{2} (87,000 sq mi)
- Discharge
  - location: Hillet Doleib
  - average: 412 m^{3}/s (14,500 cu ft/s)
  - minimum: 99 m^{3}/s (3,500 cu ft/s)
  - maximum: 680 m^{3}/s (24,000 cu ft/s)
- Discharge
  - location: mouth
  - average: 437 m^{3}/s (15,400 cu ft/s)

Basin features
- Progression: White Nile → Nile → Mediterranean Sea
- River system: Nile

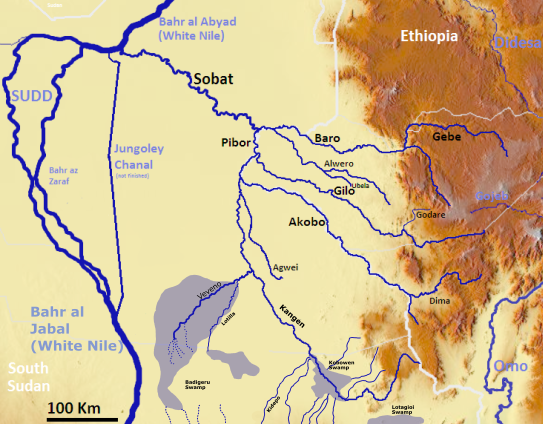
Sobat River basin

The Sobat River is a river of the Greater Upper Nile region in northeastern South Sudan, Africa. It is the most southerly of the great eastern tributaries of the White Nile, before the confluence with the Blue Nile.

== Geography ==
The Sobat River is formed by the confluence of the west-flowing Baro River and the north-flowing Pibor River, on the border with Ethiopia. The river enters the White Nile at Doleib Hill, near the city of Malakal in Upper Nile State.

When in flood the Sobat River produces an enormous discharge carrying a white sediment, which gives the White Nile its name.

=== Hydrology ===
The Sobat and its tributaries drain a watershed approximately 225,000 km^{2} (87,000 mi^{2}) in size. The river's mean annual discharge is 412 m^{3}/s (14,500 cu ft/s).

== See also ==
- List of rivers of South Sudan
