= Achwa River =

River in South Sudan and Uganda

Achwa River Aswa River
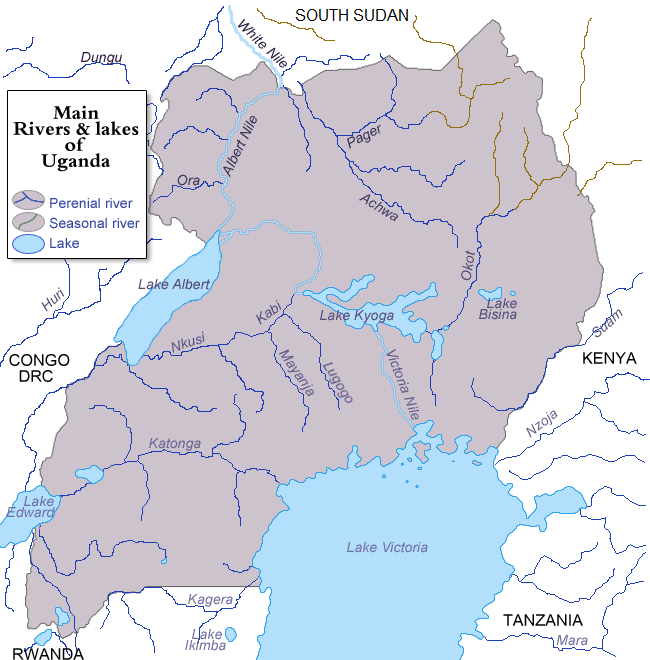

Location
- Country: Uganda, South Sudan

Physical characteristics
- Mouth
  - coordinates: 3°44′52″N 31°55′25″E
- Length: 434 km (270 mi)
- Basin size: 31,604.9 km^{2} (12,202.7 mi^{2})
- Discharge
  - location: Near mouth
  - average: (Period: 1944–1977)3 km^{3}/a (95 m^{3}/s) • (Period: 1971–2000)63.4 m^{3}/s (2,240 cu ft/s)

Basin features
- Progression: White Nile → Nile → Mediterranean Sea
- River system: Nile River
- Tributaries
  - left: Awero
  - right: Agago, Pager, Nyimur

The Achwa River is a river of Uganda. It flows through the northern central part of the country, draining much of Uganda's northern plateau and northeastern highlands, before crossing the border into South Sudan where it joins the White Nile. In South Sudan it is known as the Aswa River. The river is a lifeline for communities along its path through offering fishing activities.

The river is a source of livelihood to nearby communities despite being under degradation threats. It is a protected area.

The Achwa River is a major river in northeastern Uganda which flows northwest into South Sudan where it is named the Aswa River and joins the White Nile. The river begins in hills in the northwestern part of Katakwi Province and flows through Lira Province and becomes the border between the provinces of Pader and Gulu where the Agago River and then the Pager River flow into it. The Achwa River forms most of the border between the provinces of Atiak and Kitgum before crossing into Sudan east of the border town of Nimule and joining the White Nile about ten miles northwest of Nimule. That particular section of the White Nile is known as Bahr el Jebel or "River of the Mountain", or Mountain Nile.

The Achwa drains much of the northeastern highland and northern plateau of Uganda. Like most rivers in the region the flow of the Achwa is strongly influenced by the season and weather. It is prone to flooding at times. In 2000, it submerged the bridge connecting the cities of Gulu and Kitgum.

The distance from the Achwa's headwaters to joining the White Nile is about 185 miles. The river flows through East Sudanian savanna which encompasses much of northeastern Uganda. This hot, dry, wooded savanna composed mainly of Combretum and Terminalia shrub and tree species and tall elephant grass has been adversely affected by agricultural activities, fire, clearance for wood and charcoal, but large blocks of relatively intact habitat remain even outside protected areas. Populations of some of the larger mammal species have been reduced by hunting, but good numbers of others remain.

== Catchment and hydrology ==
The Aswa (Achwa) catchment is a transboundary basin between Uganda and South Sudan, covering over 31,000 km2. Wetlands International reports that the Aswa River Basin in northeastern Uganda drains about 27,677 km2 and contains extensive wetland systems (about 2,045 km2), with the catchment delineated into eight tributaries or sub-catchments. Average annual flow of the Aswa is reported at about 3.0 km3 per year (1940–1977).

== Ecology ==
Large parts of the Achwa basin lie in savanna landscapes of northern Uganda and South Sudan. Wetland systems in the basin support water regulation and local livelihoods, including fishing and small-scale agriculture, and provide habitat for wetland-dependent biodiversity.

== Human use ==
=== Hydropower ===
The Achwa River supports run-of-river hydropower development in northern Uganda. The Achwa II project is a 42 MW hydropower plant located on the Achwa River in the districts of Pader, Kitgum and Gulu. The project scope includes access and service roads and grid interconnection facilities.

=== Livelihoods ===
Communities in the basin depend on river and wetland resources for domestic water use, small-scale farming, livestock, and fishing, especially during dry seasons when alternative sources are limited.

== Conservation and threats ==
Parts of the Aswa basin have faced degradation pressures linked to wetland encroachment, land conversion, and declining freshwater ecosystem condition. Reporting in Uganda has linked basin degradation to reduced access to safe water for nearby communities. Restoration work in the basin has included catchment management activities focused on wetlands and landscape recovery, as documented by Wetlands International’s “Rise of Okom” initiative.

== Protected areas ==
Protected Planet lists “Achwa River” as a protected area site in Uganda (85.68 km2), designated in 1948.

== Hydrology ==
The Achwa River is a major river of northern Uganda and a significant tributary of the White Nile. Rising on the slopes of the Ugandan highlands, it flows generally north-westward before joining the White Nile near the border with South Sudan.

The river drains an extensive catchment characterised by seasonal rainfall, wooded savannas, and agricultural landscapes. River discharge varies considerably between wet and dry seasons, contributing to seasonal flooding in low-lying floodplains.

The Achwa basin has attracted interest for hydropower development because of its significant hydraulic gradient. Environmental assessments have emphasised the importance of maintaining ecological flows and protecting riparian habitats during infrastructure development.

== See also ==
- River Okot
- River Semliki
- River Sezibwa
- Rutshuru River
- River Rwizi
- Semliki River
- Sezibwa River
- Turkwel River
- White Nile
