= Medri Bahri =

Historical Eritrean province

Medri Bahri ምድሪ ባሕሪ
- 12th century – 1890
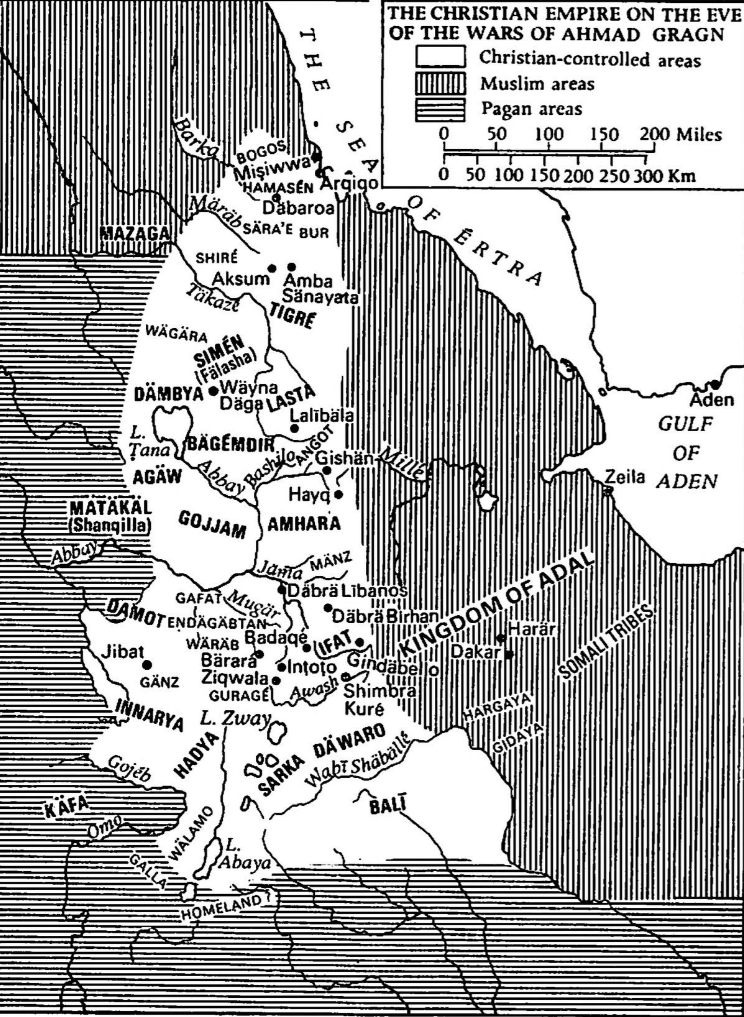
- Medri Bahri (Hamasen, Seraye, Bur, Bogos) within the Ethiopian Empire on the eve of the wars of Ahmad ibn Ibrahim al-Ghazi. The Mereb River marked its southern boundary with Tigray.
- Status: Province of the Ethiopian Empire
- Capital: Debarwa; Sa'azzaga; Addi Taolay; Asmara (from 1866)
- Common languages: Tigrinya, Ge'ez
- Religion: Ethiopian Orthodox Tewahedo Church
- Government: Hereditary/Appointed Governorship
- Bahr Negash
  - Early 12th century: Unnamed (first attested)
  - fl. late 19th – early 20th c.: Abbay Habtä Séyon (last)
- History
  - Title baher nagasi first attested: Early 12th century
  - Bahr Negash title formally established: Mid-15th century
  - Battle of Addi Qarro; death of Bahr Negash Yeshaq: 1578
  - Hab Sellus dynasty founded: 1663/64
  - Abuna ransom crisis; Bahr Negash-led blockade of Massawa: 1745
  - Wolde Selassie appointed ruler of Bambolo Mellash: 1795
  - Wube Haile Maryam consolidates control of Tigray: 1835
  - Battle of Gura; Egyptian defeat: 1876
  - Hewett Treaty signed: 1884
  - Ras Alula Engeda recalled; end of the Bahr Negash title: 1889
  - Formation of Italian Eritrea: 1890
- Currency: Amole (salt bars; universal medium of exchange); Gold (measured in waqet); Textiles (shamma; Indian cotton used in caravan trade); Maria Theresa thaler (19th century)
Succeeded by
Italian Eritrea
- Today part of: Eritrea Ethiopia

Medri Bahri (Note: Tigrinya: ምድሪ ባሕሪ, English: Land of the Sea) or Mereb Melash (Note: Tigrinya: መረብ ምላሽ, English: Beyond the Mereb. Also known as Bambolo Melash.) was a semi-autonomous province of the Ethiopian Empire, located north of the Mereb River, in the Eritrean Highlands, primarily comprising the historical regions of Hamasien and Seraye. It was governed by the Bahr Negash. The province originally held authority over coastal territories, including the port of Hirgigo and Massawa, but lost control of the coast to the Ottomans in 1557.

The highlands of Hamasien and Seraye had been part of the ancient Aksumite kingdom, whose influence reached the Red Sea port of Adulis. After Aksum's decline in the seventh century, waves of Beja and then Agaw peoples moved into the region, before it came to be dominated by Tigrinya-speaking communities under the early Solomonic dynasty. From at least the twelfth century the coastal region was ruled by local governors bearing various titles. In the mid-fifteenth century, Emperor Zara Yaqob extended the Bahr Negash's authority over Hamasen, Seraye, Shiré and Bur. Control of the trade routes linking the highlands to the coast brought the office into repeated conflict with the Ottomans during the sixteenth century, and Bahr Negash Yeshaq was killed fighting alongside them at the Battle of Addi Qarro in 1578.

By the seventeenth century, the administration of the province was by hereditary local dynasties, most prominently the family of Hab Sellus. Fragmentation of authority between the rival families of Hamasen took place during the Zemene Mesafint era, until the province once again regained its importance in the empire through Yohannes IV, who protected it against an Egyptian invasion at the Battle of Gura in 1876, and subsequently appointed Ras Alula Engeda its governor. The territory became the core of the colony of Italian Eritrea in 1890, following Alula's recall in 1889.

Below the Bahr Negash, certain settlements were allowed to govern themselves, and highland communities followed their own traditional laws, administered by councils of elders. Gold, ivory and enslaved people passed along the province's trade routes, and weapons imported helped resist the Ottomans and later the Egyptians.

== History ==
=== Ancient and Aksumite roots ===
The territory that would later form Medri Bahri was part of the heartland of the ancient Aksumite Empire. Archaeological evidence shows that the Hamasen highlands had been an area of economically flourishing culture since around 800 BC, with a settlement density among the highest on the African continent, linked to the so-called Ona culture. The name Hamasen itself may be ancient, with a possible identification with MSW ("Amasu"), a province registered in the Egyptian "Lists of Foreign People" of Pharaoh Thutmosis III, ca. 1458 BC. In Aksumite times, Hamasen appears in a pre-Christian fourth-century inscription of King Ezana, who received the homage of the Metin peoples there after subduing the coastal kingdom of Gabaz.

Seraye, the southernmost of the three highland provinces, also has a documented Aksumite presence. A rock inscription at Sehuf Emni, Qwahayn, in Epigraphic South Arabian script and palaeographically comparable to Ezana's trilingual inscriptions, testifies to the region's role in Aksumite times, and Aksumite-period church foundations survive at Enda Mikael in Debarwa, on the border of Hamasen and Seraye. According to the historian Sergew Hable Selassie, the name of the Mareb River itself may derive from the South Arabian settlers who named it after the famous dam of Marib in Yemen, and "Serae" (Seraye) is similarly linked to the South Arabian Sarawat Mountains.According to written and oral traditions, around the end of the 13th and early 14th century, the former Balaw (of Beja origin) and Kunama inhabitants of Seraye were replaced by the Adkama Malga, Agaw immigrants from Lasta, who assumed the Tigrinya language and played a dominant role in the area until the 18th century, when they came into conflict with the Daqqi Tassem of Hamasen.

Adulis remained the principal Aksumite port on the Red Sea throughout this period. The Egyptian merchant and monk Cosmas Indicopleustes, who visited the port in 523, described its trade, together with that of the Ethiopian and Nubian interior, with India, Ceylon and other regions in his geographical treatise, the Christian Topography. According to his account, the Aksumites at the time required all vessels passing through that part of the Red Sea to pay for the right of passage and call at Adulis.

After the decline of Aksum around the seventh century AD, parts of Hamasen came under the control of Beja and other Muslim tribes, possibly responsible for the first exploitation of gold mines in the region. During the last decades of the Zagwe dynasty and the first period of the restored Solomonic dynasty, Agaw groups linked with the Zagwe fled from Lasta into Hamasen, and the ancestors of the Bogos (Bilin) people also migrated through Hamasen at this time. These population movements left traces in many Cushitic-origin toponyms in the region, including the name of Debarwa itself.

Trade routes departing from Massawa and then following the course of the Anseba river northward connected Hamasen with the lowlands of the Sudan. The local Tigrinya groups of Hamasen kept their own petty leaders but were possibly tributary to the maekele bahr (lit. "the middle of the coast"), as the governor of the provinces between the Ethiopian highlands and the Red Sea is called in a series of local 13th- to 15th-century documents from the "Golden Gospel" of Debre Libanos of Ham.

Relations between the Aksumite kingdom and Arabia turned to open conflict in the seventh century. After pirates from the Kingdom of Axum sacked Jeddah in 702, Arab forces retaliated by seizing a string of harbors on the opposite shore, including Suakin, where they dispossessed the Beja who held it, along with Massawa, then still only an anchorage, and the Dahlak islands. Arab control of the ports sharply reduced Aksum's foreign trade and is thought to have spurred the empire's expansion southward into the interior instead, coinciding with growing Beja pressure on the highlands as Beja groups moved into Hamasen from the late seventh or early eighth century.

A tributary relationship with the coast nonetheless outlasted the loss of direct control for some time. The Arab historian al-Yaqubi, writing in 872, described the Najashi's kingdom as still reaching the sea and encompassing the Dahlak islands. Al-Masudi, writing in 935, likewise reported that Dahlak and the neighbouring coastal plain remained tributary to Ethiopia, and that the Najashi had concluded a treaty of friendship with the Yemeni king Ibrahim bin Ziyad, under which ships from Zabid traded freely with Ethiopia. Ibn Hawqal, writing in 977–78, similarly described Zeila as under Ethiopian Christian rule and at peace with its Muslim trading partners. This tributary relationship broke down amid the political fragmentation of the Zagwe era, during which separatist dynasties took control of both Dahlak and Zeila.

=== Zagwe period ===
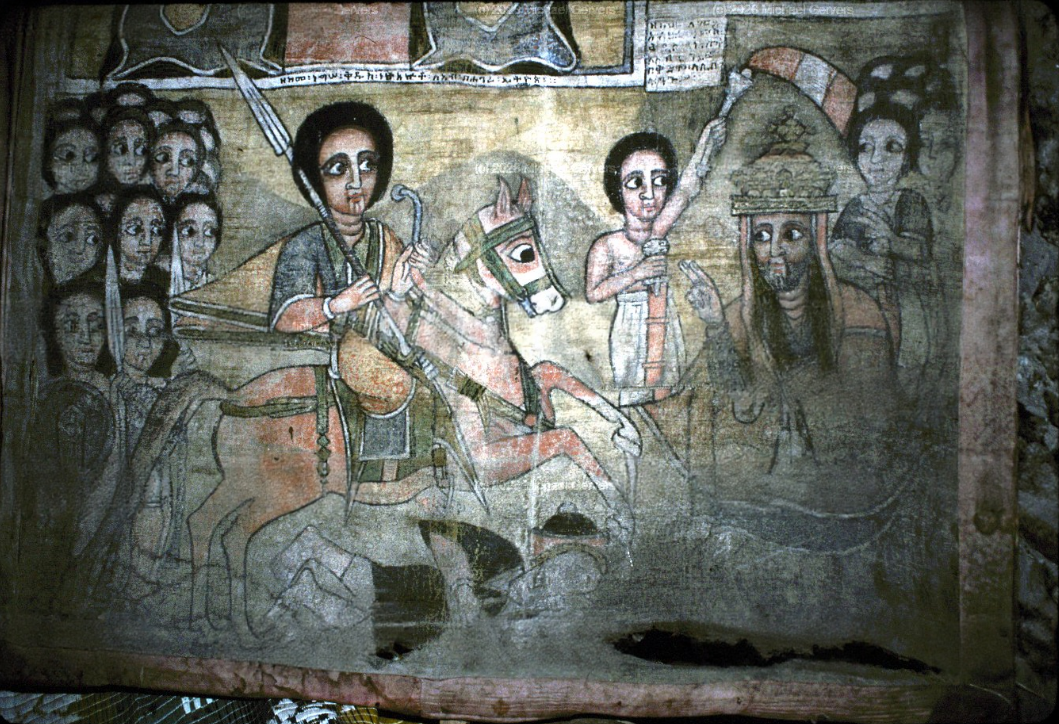
Nayakkweto Layab (left) with king Lalibala (right)

Both Hamasen and Seraye "passed, like much of the northern highlands, under Zagwe suzerainty" according to Taddesse Tamrat, confirmed by a land grant of the Zagwe king Lalibela preserved in the monastery of Debre Libanos of the north. The Zagwe pursued a deliberate strategy for annexing the regions beyond the Mareb River, at one point resettling Agaw groups from Wallo there. The title baher nagasi for a governor of the coast appears even in a land grant of the Zagwe king Tatadim, who ruled during the eleventh century, in a grant issued in the twelfth year of his reign to the church of Ura Masqal; the document threatened excommunication against the seyyuman ("appointed ones") of Agama, Bur, and Sarawe, as well as an officer bearing the title of baher nagasi, described as viceroy of the coast.

The fall of the Zagwe dynasty around 1270 and its replacement by the Solomonic dynasty "sparked off a series of population movements from the Lasta region to north-eastern Tigray, Akala-Guzai, Hamasen, and Saraye," resulting in a struggle for power between newcomers and original inhabitants, and the eventual transfer of political supremacy from the Christian Balaw tribes to new Tigrinya-speaking settlers. The Balaw tribes were of Beja origin and had dominated the Eritrean plateau, including probably some districts south of the Mareb, before this transformation. Local genealogical tradition traces the early Solomonic-period Tigrinya settlement of Hamasen and Akkele Guzai to a single legendary founder remembered as negui Meroni.

The office of the Bahr Negash had roots stretching back to the Aksumite period. The coast around Massawa is recorded as under Beja domination by the 8th century, before the rise of the Dahlak sultanate in the 11th century made the port the main link between the Muslim-controlled Red Sea coast and the Christian highlands.

Local tradition records the existence of a ruler called the shum bahri (also ieyyuma baher, meaning "ruler of the sea"), who controlled trade routes between Massawa and the Christian highlands, and who may originally have been a prefect appointed by the Aksumites. Even after the Sultanate of Dahlak became independent, its sultan continued to be referred to by the Ethiopians using the Aksumite title ieyyuma baher, reflecting the persistence of Ethiopian institutional memory over the coast.

=== Early Solomonic Administration ===
During the reign of Amda Seyon I (r. 1314-1344), the northern maritime provinces were brought under tighter imperial control. When a rebellion broke out in Tigre in 1328, the king placed one of his sons over the region with the title of maekele bahr, meaning "between the rivers or seas", covering the territory between the Mareb River and the Red Sea, a title already used in the Zagwe period and probably the precursor of the later Bahr Negash title.

Amda Seyon was deeply concerned about the dangers of Muslim power on the Eritrean coast. His recent campaigns against the Muslims of Ifat and eastern Shawa were resented by their fellow Muslims in the north, who may have cooperated with the rebellious army in northern Tigre. This may have provided an immediate reason for his expedition to the region. A land grant issued by Amda Seyon to the monastery of Debre Hayq Estifanos states: "...And I, King Amda Seyon, went to the sea of Eritrea. When I reached there, I mounted on an elephant and entered the sea. And I took up my arrow and spears and killed my enemy, and I saved my people. (Note: The name persisted well beyond Amda Seyon's reign: a Ge'ez–Amharic praise song for the Solomonic kings, compiled in stages up to the mid-sixteenth century, names the "Sea of Eritrea" alongside Tigray and Angot among the realm's long-established provinces.)

Despite this appointment, the maekele bahr did not yet constitute a formal administrative unit; rather, it remained a descriptive geographic term for the region between the Mareb River and the Red Sea, governed by local chiefs recognized by the Solomonic kings until the time of Zara Yaqob. By the same year, two named officials in Hamasen already appear in the sources as local rulers.

At least four Ethiopian monarchs of this period are recorded granting land to monasteries in the far north. Amda Seyon issued a land charter in favor of the monastery of Debre Libanos. Sayfa Ar'ad (r. 1342–1370) allocated two areas in Seraye to the convent of Abba Madhanina Egzi'e of Bankwal. Emperor Dawit granted an estate at Karnessem in Hamasen to the monastery of Debre Bizen, while Yeshaq I gave a stretch of land in Seraye to that of Debre Abbay. (Note: Pankhurst cites Conti Rossini (1901), pp. 182, 201–10, 216–17; Huntingford (1965b), pp. 32, 34; Huntingford (1989), p. 82.) Contact between the court and the northern provinces is further suggested by another medieval text, which records that the courtiers of Emperor Dawit I (r. 1380–1409) included men from Hamasen, Seraye and neighbouring districts. (Note: Pankhurst cites Tamrat (1972), p. 77, and Conti Rossini (1900), p. 65.)

Before Zara Yaqob's formal administrative reforms, Yeshaq I (r. 1414–1430) had already extended imperial presence along the coast by settling a military regiment at Massawa in 1417.

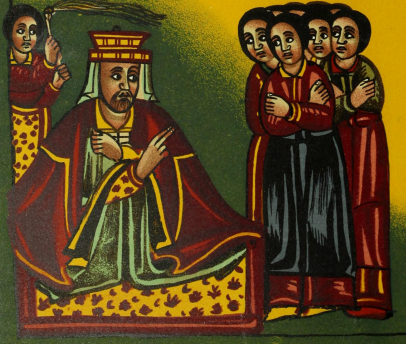
King Zara Yaqob addressing the men who had come to him

The older title maekele bahr ("middle of the coast"), used during the Zagwe period and still in use during the reign of Amda Seyon, was abolished by Zara Yaqob, who sought to unify the administrative system of his kingdom. According to historian Richard Pankhurst, it was during the reign of Emperor Zara Yaqob (r. 1433–1468) when the title Bahr Negash ("Ruler of the sea") appeared for the first time. In a reform datable to between 1436 and 1439, he "increased the power of the bahr nagash" and raised him "much above" all the shums (Note: This means "chiefs".), and he was given authority over the rulers of Shire (Note: South of the Marab River.) as well as control over the shum of Saraye, the two kantibas (Note: Local chiefs.) of Hamasen, and the shum of Bur.

To strengthen the imperial presence in the area, Zara Yaqob also established a military colony consisting of Maya warriors from the south of his realm. These settlers were believed to have terrified the local population, and it was said that the "earth trembled at their arrival" and the inhabitants "fled the country in fear".

In 1449/50, only one year after establishing the military colonies on the plateau, Zara Yaqob began construction of a seaport at Girar on the mainland opposite Massawa, intending a more permanent occupation of the coastal districts. This activity was met with hostility from the local Muslim population and led to armed conflict. It is reported that the islands of Massawa and Dahlak were pillaged in 1464/5, and that the Qadi of the islands lost his life in the encounter. However, a lasting occupation of the coast ultimately did not succeed.

The capital of the Bahr Negash was Debarwa, located next to the sources of the Mareb River; he occasionally moved to other district centres, including the nearby Addi Baro, which has sometimes been mistakenly identified as the original seat of the office.

=== Bur Province ===
Bur (ቡር) was a large and vaguely delimited historical region across the present-day Ethio-Eritrean border, divided into Upper Bur and Lower Bur. Its territory covered parts of Agame, the entire province of Akkele Guzai, and lands further east, possibly including the Buri Peninsula. From the 14th century, the region fell into the sphere of the Ewostatean monastic movement.

In the first half of the 15th century, Bur seems to have been governed by a seyum whom Emperor Zara Yaqob placed under the supremacy of the Bahr Negash, alongside the governors of Shiré, Hamasen, and Seraye. In the time of Emperor Lebna Dengel, the office of seyum was held by Zemal, a favorite of the Emperor, who fought alongside him against Ahmad ibn Ibrahim al-Ghazi and was killed on 11 March 1529 in the Battle of Shimbra Kure.

After the defeat of Bahr Negash Yeshaq in 1578, Bur fell under the rule of the tegre makwannen. The Ottoman Turks attempted to invade Bur during this period but were beaten back by local farmers (falahin): the Chronicle of Galawdewos records how troops raiding "one of the districts of Bur" were repelled, their commander Yishaq killed, and his head sent to Emperor Galawdewos. (Note: During the reign of Emperor Susenyos, challengers including a pretender named Yaqob and a false Melkite metropolitan found support among Bur's ethnically and religiously heterogeneous population, prompting punitive expeditions against the region.)

As a coastal region, Bur was of economic importance to the emperors. The Chronicle of Emperor Iyasu II describes it as part of Tigray and "the land of Bur which brings [the tribute of] 20 shekels of gold." In later periods, smaller territorial units appeared in the area and the name Bur fell out of use.

=== Ewostatean movement ===
A major factor in the Christianization and political consolidation of the northern highlands was the Ewostatean monastic movement, named after Ewostatewos of Debre Sarabi (ca. 1273–1352), who was born and educated in eastern Tigray. His followers, the Daqiqa Ewostatewos ("Sons of Ewostatewos"), proved significant for the regions of Seraye, Hamasen, Shiré, and Bur. They were initially forced to cross the Mareb River to escape persecution under Emperor Amda Seyon I, and by the end of the fourteenth century had established themselves firmly along the western edge of the Eritrean plateau. The earliest monastic settlement of the Daqiqa Ewostatewos beyond the Mareb was Debre Maryam in Qwahayn (Seraye), founded by Absadi around 1374; it became the cradle of the Ewostatean movement for the entire northern highland zone.

The Ewostatean movement had a deep relationship with local political structures. The leader of the movement in the north, Warasina Egzi of Seraye, headed the Adkama Melga descent group and used the movement for enhancing local autonomy against both the emperor and the metropolitan. The Adkama Melga had initially sheltered Ewostatewos, but conflict arose when he demanded that Warasina Egzi renounce bigamy. According to hagiographic tradition, Warasina Egzi had him jailed, then drove him from Seraye to the land of the Agaw Bilin, from where he was eventually exiled to Nubia.

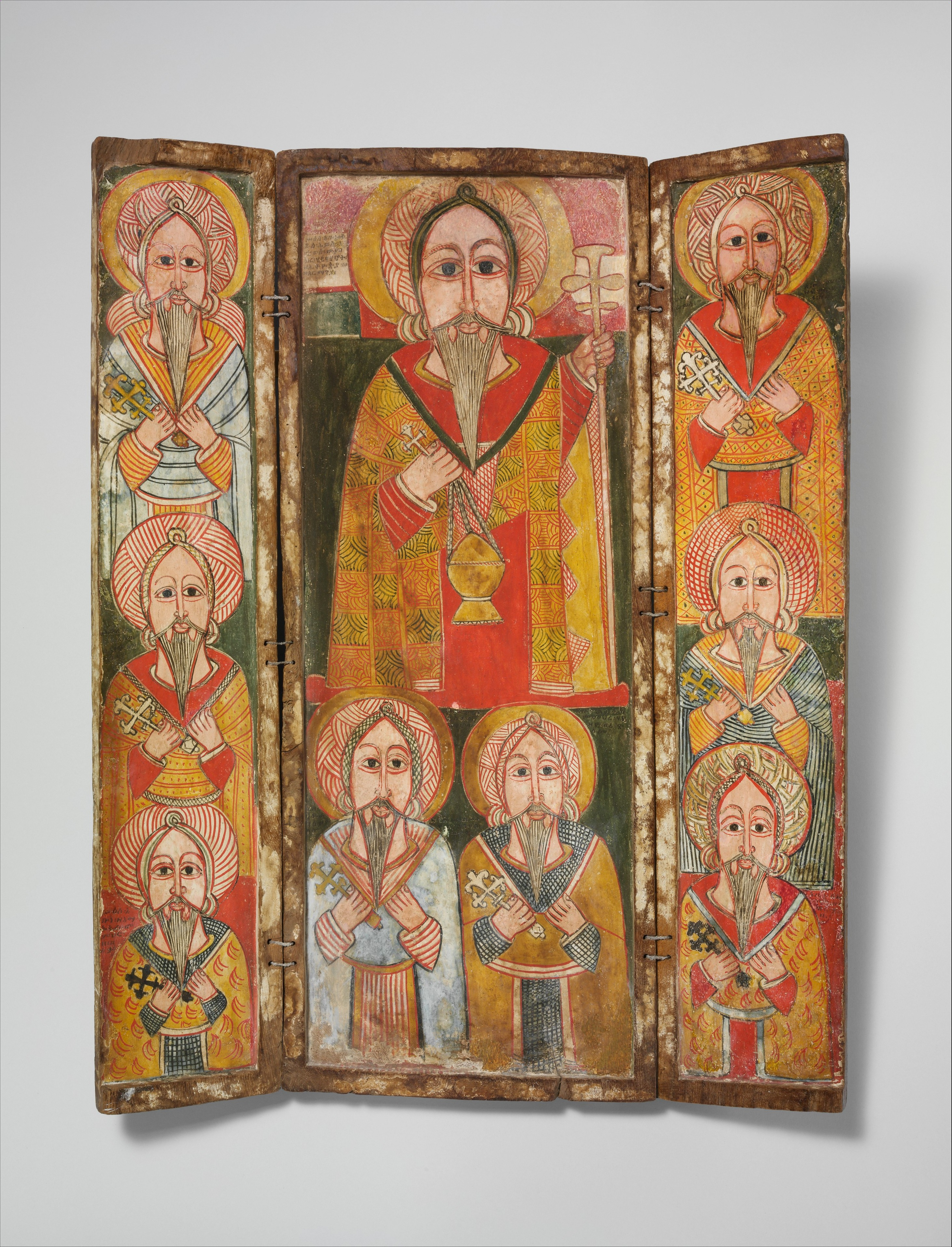
Icon triptych of Ewostatewos and eight of his disciples

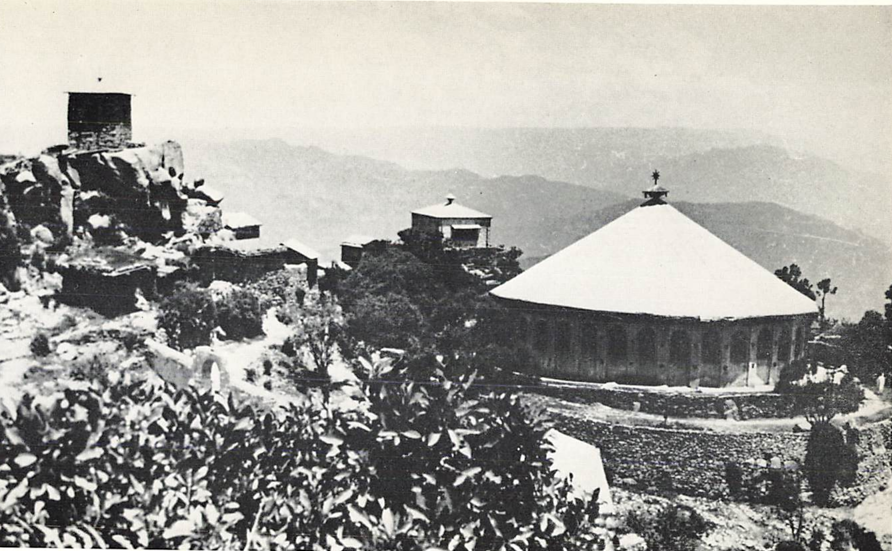
The monastery of Debre Bizen on the edge of the Hamasen plateau overlooking the Sea of Eritrea. It was founded by Abba Fillipos in A.D. 1390/1, and continued to be a strong centre of the House of Ewostatewos

During the reign of Zara Yaqob, the Ewostateans were reconciled with the imperial church. This reconciliation was mediated notably by Fileppos, the abbot of Debre Bizen, the great monastery in Hamasen that "dominates the road that leads from the highlands and the Hamasen plain to the seaboard and the port of Massawa." By this time there were three major Ewostatean centres: Debre Maryam, Debre Bizen, and Debre Daqqi Ita in Maragwez, the southernmost district of Seraye, each with large numbers of monks and affiliated dependent houses.

=== Francisco Alvares and the early 16th century ===
Ethiopian royal trade at the coast is attested slightly earlier than Alvares's visit. The Armenian agent Matthew, later sent by the Empress Regent Eleni on her embassy to King Manuel I of Portugal in 1509, had previously traded on her behalf at Massawa, Decamim and Dahlak.

In the 1520s, Medri Bahri was visited by the Portuguese traveller and priest Francisco Alvares. The current Bahr Negash bore the name Dori and resided in Debarwa, a town on the very northern edge of the highlands. Dori was an uncle of Emperor Lebna Dengel, to whom he paid tribute. These tributes were traditionally paid with horses and imported cloth and carpets. Dori was said to wield considerable power, with his authority extending from the Hamasien highlands to the port of Hirgigo. He was also a promoter of Christianity, generously gifting the churches and monasteries everything they needed. By the time of Alvares' visit, Dori was engaged in warfare against some Nubians after the latter had killed his son. The Nubians were known as robbers and generally had a rather bad reputation. They originated somewhere five to six days away from Debarwa, possibly Taka (a historical province named after Jebel Taka near modern Kassala). (Note: P. L. Shinnie suggests an origin from the area around Old Dongola instead.)

Alvares witnessed the annual geber, or tax, paid by the Bahr Nagash's domains to Lebna Dengel alongside those from three other regions: Tigray, Gojjam and Hadeya. The Bahr Nagash arrived with many lords and troops stationed in his lands, spending the entire first day presenting 150 horses, which were run and made to jump before the Emperor. The remainder of the tribute, presented the following day, consisted of silks and thin cloth from India.

The status of the territory was later specified by Lebna Dengel in a letter to King Manuel I of Portugal, in which he described the Bahr Nagash as "lord as far as Egypt." Troops from the Bahr Negash's territory were also drawn on for campaigns far to the south: in the early sixteenth century, an army of ch'awa regiments raised from Tigray and the country of the Bahr Negash, under the officer known as the hedug-ras, was deployed to suppress a rebellion led by the brother of the governor of Hadiyya.

When Alvares and his companions landed at Massawa in 1520, they were met by two emissaries from the mainland town of Hirgigo, one Christian and one Muslim, who told them the town and the surrounding mainland belonged to Christians governed by the Bahr Negash, and that Christian and Muslim inhabitants alike fled to the mountains wherever Ottoman raiders approached. The Bahr Negash of the time was a brother of the Emperor's mother. A Portuguese man-of-war reaching Massawa the following year found a number of Gujarati trading vessels at anchor; the Portuguese fleet pursued and destroyed one, while the others fled north to Suakin or south to Hirgigo and Decamim, and the Muslim merchants of Massawa took refuge with the Ethiopian governor of Hirgigo. A delegation from Hirgigo welcomed the Portuguese captain with visible enthusiasm, the local governor's letter expressing thanks that the long-prophesied arrival of Christians from overseas had finally come to pass; when the delegation returned to the mainland, a crowd said to number two thousand rushed into the sea to help drag their boat ashore, chanting only "Christian, Christian, Jesus Christ, Son of Mary".

In subsequent talks, the Portuguese captain proposed removing the Moors from Dahlak and Massawa and building a fortress at the latter port, declaring that the kings of Portugal had "always made war against the Moors" and had taken many of their lands in various parts of Africa. The Bahr Negash replied enthusiastically that his master desired nothing more than to see the Moors cleared from the land, offering men and supplies for the project. He added that the proposed fortress could be built whenever they pleased, as everything was at their king's disposal. Lebna Dengel himself was more cautious. Shown a map of the world by the Portuguese emissaries, he was struck by how small Portugal appeared on it, and proposed instead that Spain, Portugal and France jointly fortify Zeila, Massawa and Suakin so as to guard the Red Sea together with his own forces. The Portuguese replied that their king alone was capable of guarding the Red Sea "against all the power of the great Sultan and of the great Turk", citing his conquests against the King of Fez and Morocco. Only half persuaded, Lebna Dengel agreed to collaborate with Portugal alone, writing to John III of Portugal to propose joint operations against the Turks, and to the Portuguese Captain-General of the Indies, Diogo Lopes de Sequeira, granting permission to build a church and fortress at Massawa and Dahlak.

Other informants of the Venetian Alessandro Zorzi described the extent of the Bahr Negash's authority in this period. The Franciscan Brother Thomas, writing in 1523, reported that the Bahr Negash ruled the coast as far as, but not including, Suakin in the north, and held his capital at Debarwa, from where he governed Bizen, Amba Derho, Massawa, the coastal village of Edd, and several other dependencies; the barren country between Massawa and Suakin, he added, was inhabited only by shepherds and was avoided by travelers as unsafe. Suakin, Zorzi's informants agreed, was the preferred route for Ethiopian pilgrims traveling to Jerusalem, a role it retained until Ottoman conquests in Egypt and Arabia around 1516 made the route far more dangerous; a caravan of some 1,500 pilgrims that left in 1517 was largely destroyed by Ottoman troops, and a further caravan of over three hundred friars and priests was attacked and enslaved in 1525.

The territory held particular economic value as a transit zone for long-distance trade. Two main caravan routes passed through it: the main route ran via Tamben and split around the Asmara area, one branch continuing toward Suakin on the Sudanese coast and the other descending from the plateau to the mainland port facing the island of Massawa. Control of these routes was a significant source of the Bahr Negash's wealth and political leverage.

The goods flowing through Hergigo and Massawa during this period consisted mainly of gold, ivory, slaves, honey, and wax, making control of the coastal access one of the most economically consequential offices in the northern empire.

=== Ethiopian-Adal War ===
The far north was among the last parts of the empire to face the forces of Imam Ahmad ibn Ibrahim al-Ghazi during the Ethiopian-Adal War. Prior to the invasion reaching the region, troops from Saraye had fought alongside the Tigrayan army in the south, where both the Bahr Nagash Za-Wangel, who was a favorite of the Emperor, and the shum of Hamasen were killed, and the ruler of Saraye was taken prisoner at Damot. The army the Emperor led to the Battle of Shimbra Kure in 1529 itself included a contingent from the country of the Bahr Negash alongside several Agaw troops. When Ahmad pushed into Tigray in 1535 and captured Aksum, part of his army crossed the Marab River into Saraye, installing Tedros, a relative of local nobleman Tasfa Le'ul, as a puppet governor answerable to Ahmad's nephew Vizier Abbas. Tasfa Le'ul fiercely opposed the occupation, killing both Tedros and the Adal general Vizier Addole, whose head was dispatched to the Ethiopian emperor.

Addole's death prompted Ahmad to launch a punitive campaign into Saraye, where local fighters attempted resistance but were overwhelmed and driven back. The population submitted and agreed to pay tribute, and Ahmad installed new administrators over both Saraye and Hamasen. However, in Tigray the Adalite troops were plagued by a famine and an epidemic that was so severe that a number of Muslim soldiers converted to Christianity. Ahmad eventually recognized that holding the region was unsustainable and withdrew to the southwest in Begmeder.

When the Portuguese governor of India stopped at Massawa in February 1541, it was the Bahr Negash Yeshaq who informed him of King Galawdewos's precarious situation, directly contributing to the formation of the Portuguese military company of 400 soldiers subsequently dispatched to aid Ethiopia.

The damage left by the Muslim occupation was documented by the Portuguese soldier Miguel de Castanhoso upon his arrival in 1541. He found a major church near the coast destroyed and the surrounding land devastated. The villages around Debarwa had been abandoned, their inhabitants having fled into the mountains with their livestock. Local monks emerged from hiding to greet the Portuguese "with crosses in their hands, in solemn procession, praying God for pity", pleading for retribution against those who had ravaged their land.

The Portuguese naval commander João de Castro, visiting Massawa in 1541, reported that the island, previously under Ethiopian sovereignty, had recently been seized by the King of Dahlak; Portuguese forces broke the usurper's hold and briefly occupied the port themselves to secure their communications with Cristóvão da Gama's expedition inland. (Note: Pankhurst here cites Kammerer, Le Routier de Dom Joam de Castro, p. 69.)

=== Ottoman period and Bahr Negash Yeshaq ===
After the death of Imam Ahmad in 1543, Emperor Gelawdewos soon established control over the country of the Bahr Nagash, where he renewed Emperor Zara Yaqob's land charter in favor of the monastery of Debre Bizen. Gelawdewos also exiled several of the Portuguese who had assisted in the Imam's defeat but were beginning to intrigue against him and attempting to convert the country to Catholicism, sending them to Debarwa, the capital of the Bahr Nagash.

The Ottoman province of Abyssinia, the Habesh eyaleti, had been formally created on 15 July 1555, initially headquartered at Sawakin before expanding inland.

In 1557, the Ottoman Turks conquered the port of Massawa and under Ozdemir Pasha led an expeditionary force inland where they occupied the town of Debarwa. The Turkish troops then built a large fort at Debarwa, containing gold and silver vases, precious stones, rich vestments, and other valuables obtained through looting, extortions from trade, and the imposition of a poll tax on the local population. Material evidence for the Ottoman presence at Debarwa comes from two surviving copper coins minted there in 974 AH (1566/67 CE), the year of Sultan Selim II's accession, now kept in the University of Tübingen's Coin Collection. The local populace, having acquired a sizable number of firearms, succeeded in defeating the occupying force, killing an Ottoman military commander named Yeshaq and sending his head to the Emperor in triumph.

Around this time, the Bahr Negash Yeshaq, described as an "old and tried servant of Galawedewos", became very powerful due to the access to firearms which were imported through the coast. In 1560/61, Yeshaq, together with the Emperor's cousin Yohannes and a lord named Keflo, proclaimed Minas's nephew Tazkaro as a rival emperor. Minas marched against Yeshaq and routed his forces at Adyabo, though Yeshaq himself escaped, then went on to defeat Yeshaq's Amhara allies in Begemder in July 1561, a force that included Portuguese veterans who had turned against Minas over his hostility to Catholicism. Minas spared the surrendering Tazkaro at first but later had him killed. According to James Bruce, Yeshaq then "threw himself at the mercy of the Turks" and ceded Debarwa to them in exchange for their support, then installed a second rival emperor, Tazkaro's younger brother Marqos. When Minas marched against him again in late 1561 or early 1562, his army was decisively beaten at Endarta by Yeshaq's Ottoman and Portuguese allies, the latter led by Francisco Jacome, who brought muskets and artillery to the battle. Ozdemir Pasha, the long-serving Ottoman governor of Habesh Eyalet, had already died before this battle and could not have commanded it; the Chronicle of King Galawdewos places his death in 1557, while scholarship based on Ottoman archival sources places it in 1561. Minas spent the next rainy season trying to build up his own weaponry but died before he could move against Yeshaq again, leaving the conflict to carry over into the reign of Sarsa Dengel.

The young king Sarsa Dengel, who succeeded his father, Menas, to the throne in 1563, according to the royal chronicle, found himself in the midst of a bitter struggle right from the beginning of his reign. An officer known as Harbo, who was sent by azmač Yeshaq, challenged the Queen Mother to hand over both the young king and his younger brother, who escaped through the Abay river in the middle of the night, taking refuge in the monastery of Selalo as deacons, while the royal crown reached them there before they returned to the capital city. Another rebel, Hamalmal, had crowned his own king; the royal chronicle mentions that both Hamalmal and Yeshaq, who each crowned a king, fought over the royal tent, horses, and royal paraphernalia taken from the crown, and split from one another as a result.

Sarsa Dengel and Yeshaq subsequently reconciled, in a peace concluded during the 1567 rainy season and brokered by Harbo, sealed by oaths of mutual excommunication should either side break it. The king presented Yeshaq with many horses, which his territory was known for having, as well as many imported items, such as luxurious clothes and carpets, while Yeshaq for his part sent the king horses and imported silks and cloth as tribute. The chronicle records that as part of the reconciliation, Yeshaq met with two royal women in Abbawi, one of whom was Wayzaro Amata Giyorgis, Sarsa Dengel's paternal aunt. (Note: In the king's fifth regnal year, some 700 of Yeshaq's bahr negash cavalry and shield-bearers fought loyally alongside the imperial army in a battle avenging Sarsa Dengel's father, Minas.) The Turks then chose to withdraw from Debarwa, where Yeshaq went to recapture.

Harbo, who continued to broker relations between the crown and Yeshaq and hosted the king lavishly at Dambya in 1571, died during the 1574 rainy season; on his deathbed he asked the king to look after his wife and children, which Sarsa Dengel did, though the chronicle notes they later betrayed that trust. With Harbo gone, Yeshaq grew openly defiant, at one point refusing a royal summons with the message "do not call me, my lord, for I am seized with fear; do not come to me, for you will not find me," which angered the king. The nobility brokered a further oath of mutual excommunication in 1575–76, with the king stipulating that the excommunication against Yeshaq should remain in force "until the day of Yeshaq's death." Around the same time, Sultan Muhammad ibn Nasir of Harar arrived on the frontier and purged rival Muslim chiefs; the king deliberately delayed his response while continuing to send Yeshaq conciliatory gifts, including a gold collar, bracelet and crown confirming his rank, even as Yeshaq secretly negotiated with another rebel, Amba Giyorgis, over a pretender called "Ya'eqob the Israelite," whom he hoped to have proclaimed king; the chronicle likens the king's gifts in this period to Christ's gifts to Judas. Yeshaq then revolted openly, proclaiming a rival king, Walda Zata'os, and this time allying with both the Ottomans and Sultan Muhammad ibn Nasir of Harar.

Even when he revolted openly, Yeshaq did not have complete agreement in his own household: two of his household, Zaparaqlitos and 'Asbe, secretly maintained communication with the crown about his plans for many years, an act which is likened to the way the priests remained in Absalom's court to report back to David. This method of communication only came to a halt when Yeshaq, having become suspicious, confronted them in front of his family; and when the fight was about to happen, the two abandoned him completely, through the intervention of his wife, Maryam 'Ebaya, who convinced him to let them go because otherwise "they will be a source of trouble at the azmac's court." At this time too, Yeshaq sent the king a single cannonball to show that he had put himself under the authority of the Ottoman pasha, stating "I give myself to the lord of this ball, for I am afraid of my lord." Sarsa Dengel placed the cannonball on the altar of his tabernacle and, using Hezekiah's words of prayer against Sennacherib, replied that "If you have placed your trust in cannonballs, I have placed mine in my Lord Jesus Christ" Furious at Yeshaq's repeated treachery, Sarsa Dengel led a campaign into Medri Bahri, dated to 1576 in some secondary sources, though the chronicle of Sarsa Dengel places the first northern expedition against Yeshaq in 1578 or 1579. (Note: This 1576 date may reflect a distinct episode: Chekroun and Hirsch record that the Ottoman fort at Debarwa was captured and demolished by Sarsa Dengel's troops that year, whereas Yeshaq's own death, together with that of the Ottoman pasha Ahmed, came only in 1578, at Addi Qarro. The chronicle itself states that the king correctly anticipated Yeshaq would not leave his rainy-season quarters until after the harvest, and would stand his forces down in the meantime believing himself safe; Sarsa Dengel deliberately exploited this by forced-marching his army to catch Yeshaq's camp already demobilised.) Rather than storming Yeshaq's well-fortified capital of Debarwa directly, with its Turkish garrison, Sarsa Dengel's strategy was to threaten the home villages of Yeshaq's Tigrayan soldiers, forcing them to desert; as the king approached, a cascade of high-profile defections followed, including that of Gabra Iyasus, said to be privy to all of Yeshaq's affairs, and of several sons of a noble named Yohannes, one of whom, Sem'on, got the soldiers sent to detain him drunk on mead before slipping away to the king's camp. The campaign lasted from 10 November to 26 December 1578.

Yeshaq and his Ottoman allies routed the imperial forces on 13 November, but King Sarsa Dengel refused to yield ground; the chronicle frames this first encounter as divinely ordained, meant to lure the enemy into another battle that would be decisive. The second engagement that followed on 17 November was similarly inconclusive except for the defection of some of the soldiers serving Yeshaq to King Sarsa Dengel; the chronicle credits the Ottoman forces with firing their eight cannon repeatedly over seven hours without losing any man to this fire, which it attributes to the divine protection enjoyed by the king's army. During the following weeks, Yeshaq's soldiers delivered two captured cannonballs from the Ottomans to the king as a form of mockery; the king displayed the cannonballs on altars of churches while kneeling before the royal tabot, newly recovered from many years of hiding, as he said this prayer:

This wicked man has placed his trust in these cannonballs; as for me, I place my trust in you, O my Lord Jesus Christ; do not abandon me, your servant, son of your servants; let not my enemies mock me and say: Where is his God?

With both armies entrenched in their fortified mountain positions and no further battle for some weeks, Yeshaq's court lady, Wallato, referred to as "mother of the king by grace", tried once more to mediate peace between them, coming to Yeshaq's camp at the king's request. When she asked him to desert the Turks, he answered, "The Turk has come to help me: how can I fight him?" and she said to him, "If you place your faith in the might of the Turks, the might of Jesus Christ is greater." Abba Neway, guardian of the recovered royal tabot, kept sending letters of rebuke to Yeshaq during this time, likening him first to Judas, then to Pharaoh, and then to the rich fool of St Luke. Gudar, whose riches had been bestowed upon him by the king but who defected and now met with disdain from the Ottoman pasha himself, was put to death within ten days, a fate the chronicle judges worse than that of Judas, since Gudar, unlike Judas, never repented. In anticipation of the ultimate battle, Yeshaq ignored the prediction of one of his own fortune-tellers, who had warned that victory would belong to King Malak Sagad, and trusted another who predicted his own victory instead; and the Ottoman pasha himself is reported to have remarked on the entire affair as one between three fools: himself, for abandoning his stronghold; Yeshaq, for refusing to accept peace with his own monarch; and the king whom Yeshaq crowned, "who has not one horse and yet calls himself a king."

Although Yeshaq's forces, backed by the Turks, were well provisioned with firearms of various kinds including cannon, the last battle took place at Addi Qarro on 26 December and routed Yeshaq's army; the king assigned command of one wing of his forces to Daharagot, together with Takla Giyorgis. (Note: The chronicle names him nagaš of Gojjam at this point; this is the same Daharagot who later held the Bahr Negash title and governorship of Tigray by 1587 (see below).) Yeshaq fled the battlefield with a handful of Ottoman horsemen, but was intercepted alone and speared in the back by a foot-soldier under Takla Yohannes, son of Robel of Madabay, who then boasted of the kill; he was carried back to camp mortally wounded and died after being struck by further spears while already incapacitated, though the chronicle notes disagreement among its sources over whether he was beheaded before or after death. The Ottoman commander was also killed in the same engagement, speared through the chest and beheaded by a warrior named Yona'él, who took his gold-worked sword as a trophy. Yeshaq's rival claimant was captured alive and wounded, and spared summary execution on the king's orders to be held for later judgement.

As historian Merid Wolde Aregay argued, the revolt was not driven by "separatist motives" but by Yeshaq's ambition to influence imperial politics from the northern periphery. Richard Caulk sees Yeshaq as part of a long tradition of such attempts in the territories lying between Tigray and the coast to undermine the imperial system, characterizing Yeshaq as someone who had "treacherously allied with the Turks after initially repulsing their advance from Massawa to his capital at Däbarwa", although he adds that the people in Tigray and farther north were "probably no more unruly than those elsewhere".

The defeat curtailed the broader aspirations of the provincial nobility to break free from the Ethiopian Empire. Sarsa Dengel thereafter reduced the prestige of the Bahr Negash office, which was temporarily merged with the governorship of Tigray. After Yeshaq's death, the Emperor accorded another local chief the title of Bahr Nagash, but the post lost much of its former prestige. Bruce claims that because of Yeshaq's treachery, the post "fell into disrepute", and that the standard and drum, the marks of supreme power, were taken from the office. When a new Bahr Nagash was appointed he still had the privilege of being crowned with gold, but had a cloak thrown over him, one side white and the other dark blue, the officer who crowned him admonishing him of what would befall him if he preserved his allegiance, signified by the white side, and of the disgrace and punishment that attended treachery, figured by the color of mourning.

However, according to the chronicles of Emperor Susenyos I, close contacts between the Bahr Nagash and the imperial interior were maintained during his reign; Susenyos married one of his daughters to the Bahr Nagash, a man by the name of Amda Mikael, for political and strategic reasons. During a punitive expedition against a pretender to the throne, Susenyos visited at least six localities north of the Mareb: Hamasien, Seraye, Akele Guzai, the Debarwa district, the Buri Peninsula, and the "country of the Sahos".

Following the rains of 1587, the Turks renewed their attack against Debarwa, attacking Governor Dejazmatch Daharagot, who was concurrently the Bahr Negash and governor of Tigray, and who was said to have the right to appoint and dismiss the Tigray chiefs at will as the representative of the king, forcing him to flee with many losses. The account of Pankhurst is corroborated by the royal chronicle, which records that Daharagot's forces fled and dispersed, with his banner and armor being taken, including as fatalities the aqasan of Seraye and the kantiba of Hamasen.

In reaction to this, Sarsa Dengel rallied his army. While the Turks attempted to cross the Mareb River, they fell victim to an ambush staged by Aquba Mika'el, who, according to the chronicle, was at that time "like a private individual" and not yet Bahr Negash, commanding no more than eighty of his own shield bearers. During the battle, Aquba Mika'el made a name for himself by personally beheading two Turkish leaders, and around seventy Ottoman captives taken in the ambush were mutilated. The Emperor was pleased with the results and gave Aquba Mika'el the rank of Bahr Negash, giving him also a gold head ornament signifying the position, a gold bracelet, and a mule with a gold harness just like that of the king. The pasha, learning the king's relief force was closing in, abandoned Debarwa by night, leaving behind close to two thousand cannonballs and his camp equipment; Sarsa Dengel, arriving to find the fortress empty, was left "greatly vexed" at missing the chance for open battle.

Sarsa Dengel then advanced to Debarwa and launched a campaign against the Ottoman position at Hergigo, known in the chronicle as Dakhano. The Encyclopaedia Aethiopica identifies the Turkish commander there as Kadawered, a corruption of Huda Verdi Pasha, the twelfth Ottoman governor of Habesh Eyalet who had taken office in 1588. In a coordinated night assault on the fortress, which the pasha had ringed with a hedge of thorny qantafa wood the local Tigre called zalagiya, the defenders were driven back into their towers and a handful of ships, the Ottoman pasha was shot and knocked to the ground, and a monk was killed by cannon fire from the ships after declaring he "must offer my blood in sacrifice to the Lord"; the siege ultimately failed for lack of provisions, and the king withdrew to Debarwa by way of Debre Bizen. It was in this same episode that the local Muslim leader Ali Garad began to defect back toward the Ottomans, having previously sided with the Ethiopians.

Following the fighting, Sarsa Dengel had a local Muslim leader, Shaykh Ali Garad, interrogated and executed at Darfo near Asmara for siding with the Turks. After receiving a peace offering from the Turks, the Emperor turned against Wad Ezum (also known as Yeshaq Wolde Ezum), a Hamasen peasant who had risen to prominence in the 1580s by defeating a Turkish force and capturing its weapons, but who was later installed as a rival Bahr Negash by the Ottomans. Wad Ezum was killed in battle by Aquba Mika'el, whom Sarsa Dengel further honored by proclaiming that he should henceforth be called not only Bahr Negash but also "Son of the King".

Realizing the impossibility of holding the northern Ethiopian highlands, the Turks abandoned Hergigo, and the port was eventually entrusted to a local Beja chieftain with the title of Na'ib, or Deputy. This position remained in use for more than two centuries.

=== Diplomacy with Massawa and Bahr Negash succession ===
Ethiopian rulers, though, never fully accepted the Ottoman hold on Massawa. On 26 June 1604, Emperor Za Dengel wrote to King Felipe III of Spain asking that the Viceroy of Goa attack the port, promising that the Ethiopian governor of the coastal province would simultaneously advance to retake Hirgigo, since the Turks on the island depended entirely on the mainland for food and water. Za Dengel then declared, "We will not send honey, slaves, or other supplies to Massawa, till we have taken power from the Turks." Pedro Páez believed that the Ethiopians were in a strong position to do this as the Turks on the island were dependent on food and water from the mainland.

Tension over Massawa flared again in 1615, when a Turkish raiding party sent to steal cattle was routed by the Ethiopians, who killed a hundred and ten of the raiders and captured sixty-two rifles. The Pasha of Massawa seized Portuguese goods in reprisal, and Emperor Susenyos responded by ordering the trade route to the port closed until everything taken from the Portuguese was restored; a change of Pasha delayed the dispute's resolution into 1616. Renewed fighting in 1625 ended in a heavy Ottoman defeat, after which Susenyos believed Massawa within his grasp, though he had no wish to govern it directly. The following year an agreement was reached with Jesuit mediation, exempting the Emperor's goods from tribute at Massawa and Suakin, granting his agents free passage to India, exempting Catholic Church property from taxation, and guaranteeing the Jesuits free movement; the treaty specified that if any article were broken, the Bahr Negash would immediately close the trade routes and seize caravans bound for the port until instructed otherwise by the Emperor.

The treaty was soon violated, and Susenyos remained reluctant to reassert Ethiopian control at the coast directly. The Jesuit Barradas records that a nobleman of Seraye, a capable soldier with a substantial following, proposed to seize Hirgigo and Massawa himself, but Susenyos refused him permission; Barradas suspected the Emperor feared that a noble once established at the coast might use the position to break free of central authority altogether. As a result the Naib of Massawa continued to damage the port's trade through his exactions without the Emperor obtaining any share of its revenue, a state of affairs Barradas contrasted with nearby Suakin, whose customs were divided between the coastal ruler and the rulers of the interior.

Difficulties at Massawa and Hirgigo increased Ethiopian interest in the smaller Dankali port of Beilul, whose ruler was a tributary of the Emperor. The port was so little known internationally that Portuguese pilots traveling there in the 1620s could give no account of its location, and it saw correspondingly little use.

The exact date of the first Na'ib's appointment is uncertain; most sources place it in the late seventeenth century, though some have suggested the sixteenth. The Na'ib family originated from the Balaw group, which had a power base at Hergigo from around the fifteenth century. In the mid-eighteenth century, Na'ib Uthman Amir (r. 1741–81) received from highland rulers 44 gwelt (Note: A gwelt is a unit of land that comes with the right to collect tribute from the people on it.) lands in exchange for firearms, covering localities near Addi Qayyeh, west of Halay, Emba Derho, Balaza, and Bet Maqa in Hamasen, as well as lands in Seraye and near Adwa. Though the Na'ib, a hereditary dignitary of Beja origin, bore a Turkish title meaning "deputy", he and his predecessors were beholden to the emperors for the fiefs granted to them on the highlands.

By the early nineteenth century, Na'ib Hasan Idris had famously defied an Ottoman governor of Massawa by declaring that "the Sultan rules in Istanbul, the Pasha in Egypt, and Na'ib Hasan in Massawa." Egypt acquired Massawa from the Porte in 1865 under Khedive Ismail, after which the Na'ib's political autonomy declined sharply. Rubenson dates the erosion earlier. Massawa was placed under Egyptian administration again in 1846, and the new governor, Ismail Haqqi, who arrived in March 1847, destroyed the autonomy of the na'ibs by burning Arkiko on 16 June 1847. Na'ib Muhammad kept a nominal title, but his share of the trade taxes was abolished and he was left powerless. Massawa went back from Egypt to the Porte in 1849. The firman giving Massawa and Suakin to Ismail was dated mid-May 1865, but Massawa kept its old administration until Egypt took it over on 30 April 1866.

Susenyos's own chronicle traces a further line of Bahr Negash holders earlier in his reign. By 1608, his half-brother Se'ela Krestos governed Tigray while also holding the Bahr Negash title, with authority said to extend "up to the Eritrean Sea," but his harsh rule drove the Tigrayans into revolt. The nobleman Gabra Maryam kept faith with both Se'ela Krestos and the Emperor through the unrest, and once Susenyos removed Se'ela Krestos from his post, Gabra Maryam took over as Bahr Negash. Sent to southern Sudan in 1619 to the "country of Arom", he forced the submission of a local ruler known as Queen Fatima, and went on serving Susenyos loyally even after the Emperor's conversion to Catholicism, before eventually losing the Bahr Negash title to Susenyos's son-in-law, Takla Giyorgis.

Takla Giyorgis had risen through Susenyos's service over more than two decades. A nobleman from Endarta, he first appears in the chronicle in 1605 as shum of Dahana, north of Lasta, and by 1614 governed Semen, where he put down a rebel claiming to be the dead Emperor Yaqob. By 1619, he was already tegre makwannen (Note: Governor of Tigray.), leading a Tigrayan force into the region of Taha, possibly near Kassala, and the following year, he joined Susenyos in battle against Oromo raiders in Tigray. He later guided the Jesuit traveler Jerónimo Lobo during a search for the remains of Cristóvão da Gama.

By 1628, Takla Giyorgis held both the Tigray governorship and the Bahr Negash title at once, and that September he rebelled against Susenyos over the Emperor's continued support for the Jesuit mission. Two other men holding the Bahr Negash title joined him, Yohannes, based between Debarwa and Massawa, and Gabra Maryam, while at the same time he was feuding separately with another Tigrayan chief and Bahr Negash, Amda Mikael, who instead allied with Susenyos against him. The rebellion fell apart after Takla Giyorgis had a Jesuit priest serving as his chaplain killed, prompting Gabra Maryam to abandon him out of fear of royal punishment. Takla Giyorgis was captured by Qeb'a Krestos and taken to Gannata Iyasus, where he was tried and executed, while nothing further is recorded of Gabra Maryam's fate.

The expelled Catholic Patriarch Afonso Mendes later petitioned the King of Spain that Massawa and Hirgigo be occupied by a Portuguese garrison, with a fortress and permanent troops, as the only remaining means of converting Ethiopia by force; nothing came of the proposal. Emperor Fasilides, once the Jesuits had been expelled, concluded treaties with the Ottoman pashas of both Massawa and Suakin closing the ports to further European contact.

=== Hab Sellus dynasty ===
The northern power of the Ethiopian crown over the region was fragmented by appointing several governors, but in the 17th century, a Daqqi Tassem dynasty loyal to the Gondarine kingdom emerged, with Daggiyat Hab Sellus based at Sa'azzaga near Asmara. Hamasen then gained a high degree of autonomy and came to include Seraye. In 18th-century versions of the administrative law code Ser'ata Mangest, Hamasen appears divided into Amasen gra and Amasen qann ("northern" and "southern Hamasen"). The successive governors mostly came from Hab Sellus's dynasty, which eventually split into two competing branches: the Enda Sa'azzaga and the Enda Hazzaga. Their authority extended over Bogos, which paid tribute to them until it became Egyptian-controlled in the 19th century.

The founding figure of the Daqqi Tassem was Atashshim (ca. 1600–50), son of Hezbay, whose own sons included Tasfasen, Gabra Krestos, Abreham, Beruh, Monqoreyos, Zartonay and Musa. Tasfasen in turn established two hereditary ruling lines in Hamasen: Takkala Aggaba, centred around Sa'azzaga and Minab, and Minaba Zaray, centred around Hazzega. After Tasfaeen's death around 1660, his sons all pressed competing claims to the governorship of Hamasen, and their descendants remained in conflict for generations. The height of Sa'azzaga power came under bahri nagashi Solomon Tasfasen, grandson of Dejazmatch Gabra Krestos Habta Sullus, while Hazzega was contested by kantiba Zaray and his son Solomon. This rivalry eventually produced the well-known feud between Sa'azzaga, under the leadership of Hailu Tewolde Medhin, and Hazzega, under the leadership of Wolde Mikael Solomon, which ended with the death of Dejazmatch Hailu Tewolde Medhin at the Battle of Wakki Dabba on 17 July 1876 against Wolde Mikael Solomon.

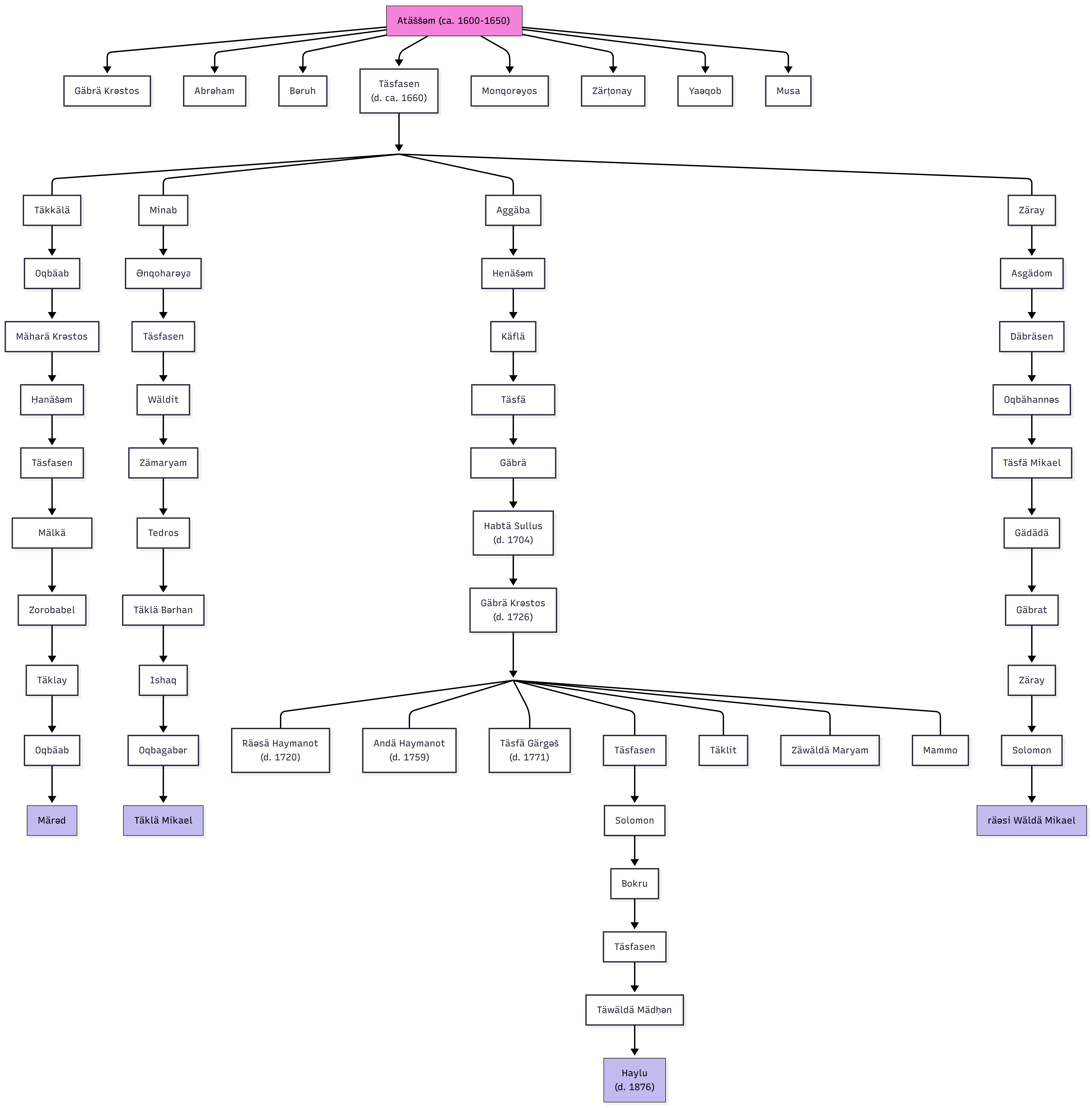
Genealogical pedigree of the Daqqi Tassem dynasty in Hamasen

Bambolo-Mellash followed a naming convention used for other northern provinces of the Gondarine period, in which the suffix mellash ("beyond" or "starting from") was attached to a river's name. Bambolo was itself the name of a village near the Angarab river north of Gondar, possibly also used as an alternative name for that river or a smaller tributary. As an administrative unit, Bambolo Mellash only existed when an emperor appointed a governor over it, and the place name "Bambelo" is already attested in a list of districts of Wagara dating to the late 16th century, predating Hab Sellus's governorship.

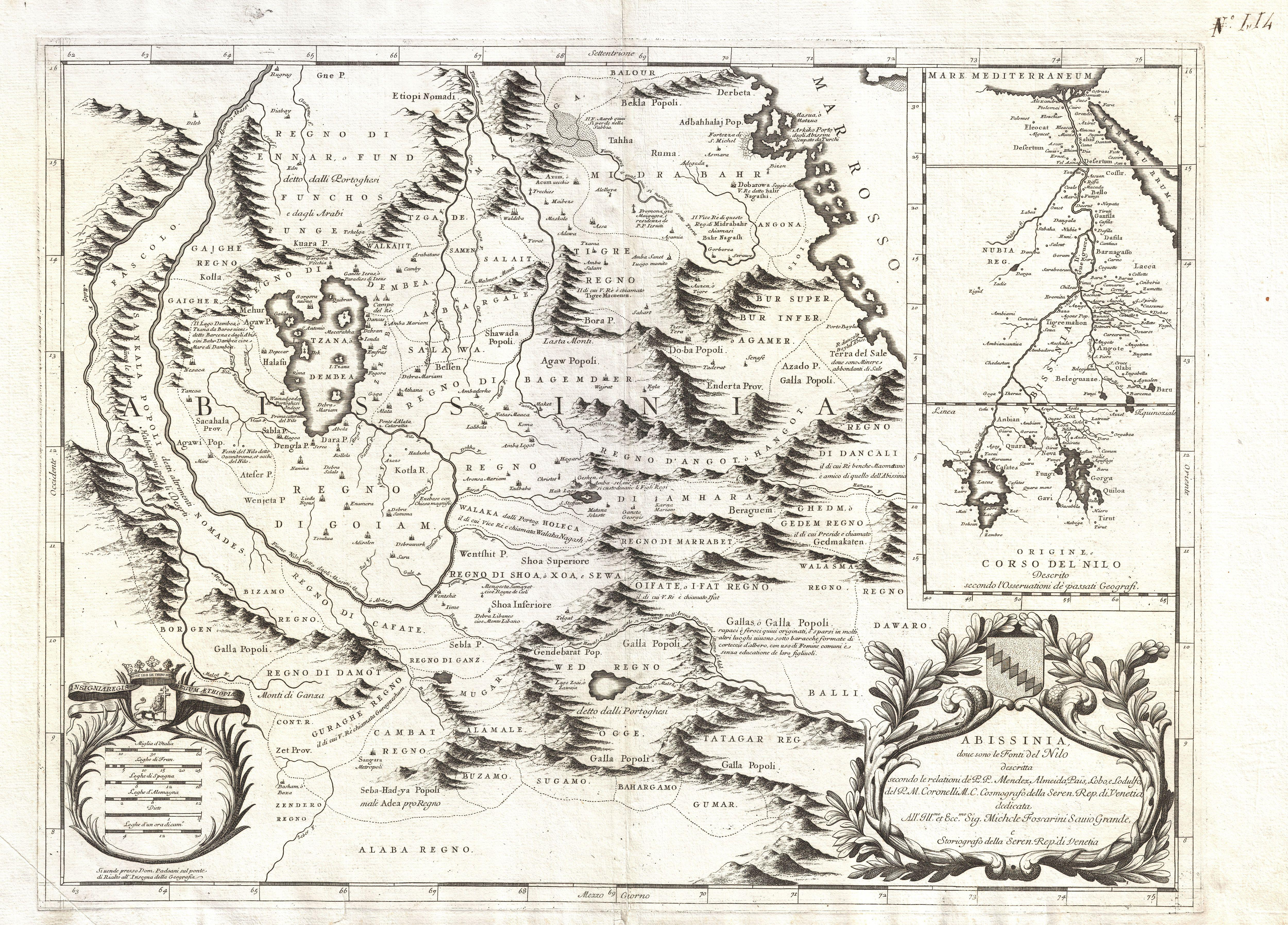
1690 map of Ethiopia (Abyssinia) by Vincenzo Coronelli illustrating Midrabahr (Midri Bahri) in the northern part of Abyssinia.

Hab Sellus (also Habta Sellase) was born at Salale to kantiba (Note: Office of the ruler of Hamasen.) Gabra Sellase of Salale, son of Tasfallase, and etiye Maryata Ab. Hoping to secure the nagarit (Note: Historically, the nagarit in Ethiopia belonged to royalty and was a symbol of political power alongside other instruments, and was given to a newly appointed governor or tribal chief confirmed by him.) of Hamasen, then held by his cousin Emmeha, he went to Gondar to attend the court of Emperor Fasilides. After seven years there, he attracted the Emperor's notice, demonstrated his courage, and was given an honorary garment and eventually the title abeto.

Emperor Fasilides then married his daughter (or a relative) to him and appointed his son-in-law, Hab Sellus of Hamasien, as the governor of a province known as Bambolo-Mellash, which included Mereb Melash and much of Tigray. However, he abused his wife so violently that she died, after which he would make his way to the Emperor's palace in Gondar to seek forgiveness. Upon arriving in the palace he addressed the Emperor, saying, "Your Majesty, in your great magnanimity, gave me your daughter and appointed me; but when I wished to approach my wife in accordance with nature and the law she rejected my approach; whereupon I, incited by Satan, raised my hand and struck her; and she died as a result of my blow. Because of this misfortunate I stand before Your Majesty." Fasilides, fearing to alienate the people of Hamasien, spoke to one of his daughter's slaves to confirm the story. He then asked the theologians of his court: "If I pardon him, would I be guilty?" They told him no, so he decided to forgive his son-in-law, declaring, "You did to her what she deserved." But he significantly reduced his fiefdom to just Mereb Melash with the title of Dejazmatch. Hab Sellus subsequently returned to Hamasien and brought the entire region of Mereb Melash under his authority.

Hab Sellus appointment is dated to around 1663/64 according to tradition, and the region of Hamasen became so associated with his rule that the phrase medra Ab Sellus ("Land of Hab Sellus") was recorded in the short chronicles as a synonym for Hamasen. His hereditary fief (Note: A fief is an estate of land granted by a lord to a vassal in exchange for loyalty, military service, and political support) was Addi Sefalat in the Loggo Cewa district of Hamasen, where he was buried on 6 September 1704. He founded the dynasty known as the Ad Daggiyat ("family of the Dejazmatch"), drawn from the district of Daqqi Tassem, which held authority over the Marab Mellas until the appointment of Ras Alula Engeda in the 1870s.

Hab Sellus's son, Gabra Krestos, later traveled to the imperial court in Gondar in his elder brother's place after his brother had refused to represent their father there to present the tribute owed; he used the opportunity to become the Emperor's guardian before rising to the rank of Dejazmatch. Around 1675, the reigning Emperor gave him his relative Sabana Giyorgis as a wife, a descendant of Emperor Fasilides through a female line. In recognition of his rise at court, he was granted the full governorate of the Bambolo Mellash, meaning authority over all the northern provinces (probably excluding Welkait), and became the co-governor of the Marab Mallas alongside his father, while he was still living. He took part in his father's government in a subordinate capacity, attending him during judicial proceedings and audiences with officials, which were always held at May Bala. Their joint government also produced a new law code for Hamasen, the Heggi Hab Sellus Gara Kestos, drawn up with input from the region's assembly of elders; the government of Gabra Krestos was also remembered as a period of enhancement of trade, with new regular markets appearing in Hamasen, including at Debarwa. After Hab Sellus died on 6 September 1704, Gabra Krestos ruled alone until his own death on 8 November 1713. He was succeeded by his son Mammo, who extended his authority to include Oromo areas and from around 1722 also held the governorship of Welkait for seven years; he suppressed a rebellion in Seraye during his tenure, with Hamasen remaining the centre of power throughout his family's dominance.

The commercial value of the region in this period is documented by Murad himself, who reported to the Dutch during his 1686-87 visit to Batavia that the Massawa trade was so considerable that Debarwa, the capital of Hamasen, and Seraye each provided Emperor Iyasu with five hundred ounces of gold a year.

The relationship between Hamasen and the Massawa Na'ib during this period was at times confrontational. In 1693, the Emperor Iyasu's Armenian trade agent Murad returned from a journey to the Dutch East Indies carrying presents for the monarch, which were seized by Na'ib Musa of Massawa. Iyasu, greatly angered, sent a message to Hab Sellus and two other functionaries, as well as "all the people of Hamasen," ordering them to proclaim throughout their domains that no one should bring honey, butter, cheese, or "anything necessary for life" to Massawa until he arrived to attack it, threatening that any transgressor would forfeit his life and have his house destroyed. Hab Sellus and the Hamasen officials enforced the blockade, cutting off provisions to the Na'ib, who was compelled to restore the seized property and added to it "objects a thousand times more numerous."

The French physician Charles Poncet, visiting in 1700, left a description of Debarwa at the time. He noted that there were then two functionaries simultaneously bearing the title of Bahr Nagash. When news reached Debarwa of the death of Emperor Iyasu's eldest son Fasiladas, both governors immediately ordered the news proclaimed throughout the area by trumpet. The following day they led all the militia and "an infinite number of people" to a church dedicated to the Blessed Virgin for a solemn service for the prince, after which they received the officers and persons of note in a great hall, where men and women sang mourning songs "in so doleful a tone" that Poncet was unable to keep from weeping for the entire hour the ceremony lasted.

Throughout this period, the leaders of Hamasen, concerned chiefly with protecting their trade routes, generally maintained practical relations with the Ottoman administration of Massawa, including through marriage ties; oral tradition also recalls treaties concluded with the Na'ib. In the 18th century the Na'ib founded a settlement called Bet Maa, identified with the hill known today as Forto in Asmara, populating it with Muslim families who had acquired grazing rights; travelers arriving from the Red Sea would sometimes stay there first before being permitted to enter the Ethiopian Empire.

According to the French traveller de Maillet, the Na'ib of Hirgigo had at one time sent his own trading agents inland to Gondar, but after they were found attempting to locate Ethiopia's gold mines, the Emperor had them replaced with foreign agents operating directly under his own orders instead.

However, by 1745, increasing tension at the port again brought in the Bahr Negash. Emperor Iyasu II raised some 450 waqets (ounces) of gold and sent a group of merchants and clergy to Cairo to fetch a new Abuna, but they were seized at Massawa by the Naib and held until at least half their money was surrendered. Iyasu then ordered Ras Mikael Sehul of Tigray and Bahr Negash Solomon to blockade the port in response, though the Naib later forced the captives to pay before the blockade could take effect. The Abuna himself was smuggled through Massawa by Ras Mikael's Greek agent Janni. His companion Tewodros, though, was imprisoned by the Naib until an additional eighty ounces of gold was paid for his release.

While investigating the Naib's persistent defiance, Iyasu learned that both the governor of Tigray and the Bahr Negash could, in Bruce's own words, reduce Massawa "to nothing with his little finger", and that the Naib's confidence rested with his friendship with Ras Mikael. But when Mikael refused a summons to Gondar over this affair, he fled to the mountain stronghold of Samayat, unsuccessfully resisted, and was ultimately required to come down carrying a stone on his head as a token of guilt before being briefly imprisoned and then pardoned. The Naib, in the meantime, had made the Emperor a peace offering.

The exact date of the establishment of the Mereb Melash as a distinct administrative unit is not known, though the Encyclopaedia Aethiopica suggests it may have emerged in the 17th century. Portuguese sources of the same period refer to a province called "Marebo", corresponding to the territory of the Mereb Melash. In that period, the province of Tigray was reported to consist of two segments: one governed by the Tigre Makonnen with twelve provincial governors, and the other by the Bahr Negash also with twelve provincial governors, which corresponds to what later became formally known as the Mereb Melash.

The Mereb River was consolidated as a firm provincial boundary in the mid-18th century when the older and larger province of Bambollo Melash was partitioned, with Tigray falling to Ras Mikael Sehul and the Mereb Melash going to Anda Haymanot's grand-nephew Booru Solomon; Anda Haymanot's own descendants settled mainly at Kalkalti, their principal fief.

=== Zemene Mesafint ===
The decline of the Gondarine monarchy coincided with the rise of Ras Mikael Sehul of Tigray, who, as ruler of the north, inherited the imperial interest in the land of the Bahr Nagash and Massawa. In 1766, he crossed the Marab river to control Hamasen and Saraye, residing briefly at Debarwa. By the end of the 18th century, Ras Wolde Selassie of Tigray held nominal sovereignty over the region, and when he planned an expedition to Saraye and Hamasen in 1800, people from these districts arrived bearing tribute. Pankhurst concludes that the country of the Bahr Nagash "thus remained as for so long in the past a major tributary territory."

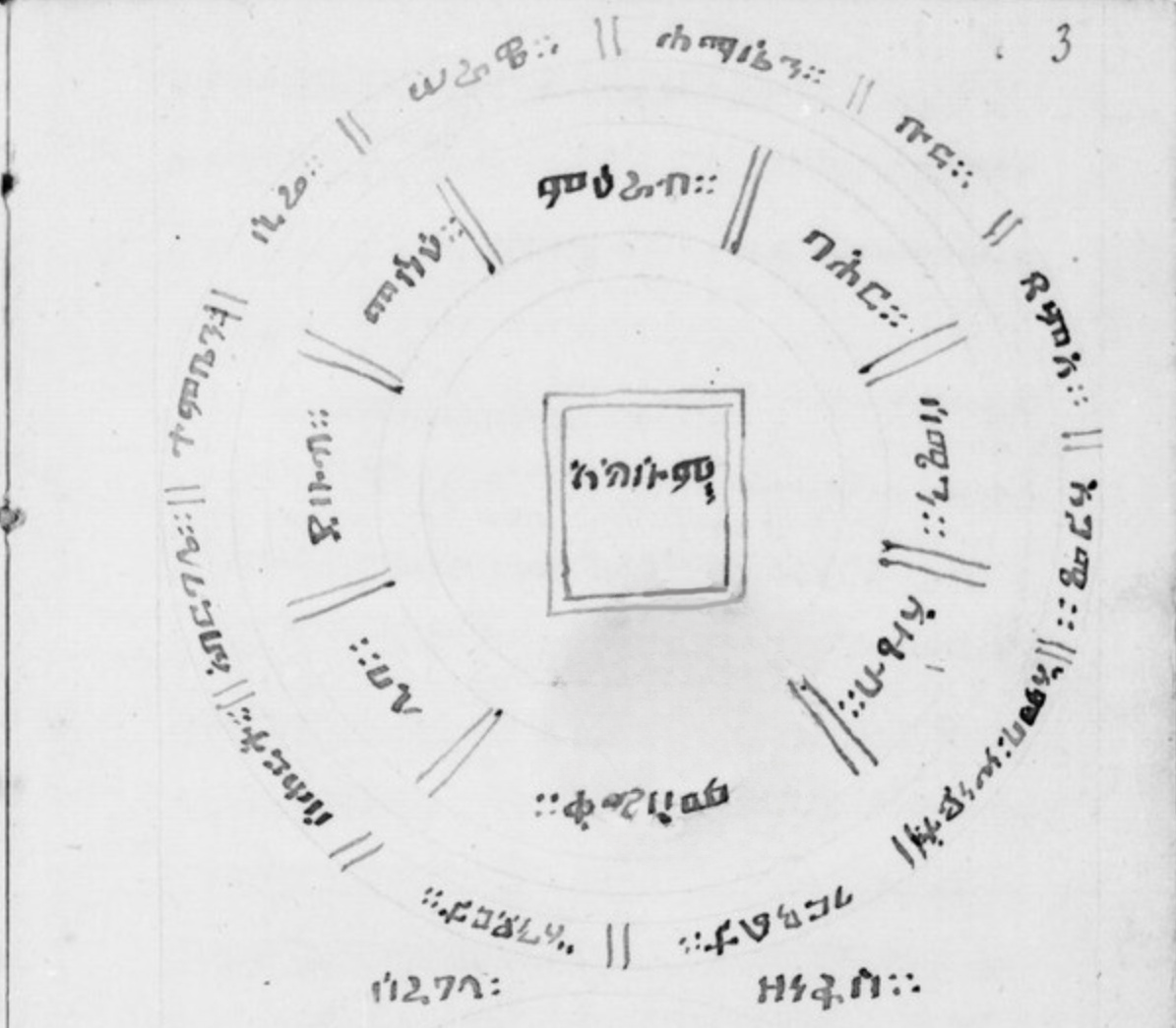
Map of Tigray, 15th century, from the Mashafa Aksum (Book of Aksum), showing Aksum at center surrounded by the principal regions of northern Ethiopia. Hamasen and Saraye (core territories of Mereb Melash) appear in the outer ring.

As governor of a province astride the direct route to the coast, Ras Mikael Sehul controlled the greater part of Ethiopia's external trade, profited from the customs dues it generated, and was able to secure the best firearms entering the country.

In November 1769, the Scottish traveller James Bruce became acquainted with the Bahr Negash while staying in the village of Hadawi (near Segeneiti). He described the unnamed ruler as a "very simple, good-natured man" and a deputy of Ras Mikael Sehul, but he also considered the land to be a "barbarous and unhappy country." Bruce later revealed that the influence of the Bahr Negash had significantly declined due to the loss of Massawa and Hirgigo to the Turks, stating that it was formerly of great importance; "Before the Abyssinians lost the maritime district of Arkeeko, and the port of Masuah, the office of Baharnagash was one of the most important in the kingdom. It is now nearly a nominal one, under the governor of Tigre." He also reports that the district had only been recently incorporated into the province of Tigray by Ras Mikael Sehul with the use of "violence and oppression." By the time of Bruce's visit the seat of the Bahr Negash was the village of Hadawi, which had only eighty houses, a striking contrast to Debarwa's former size and standing.

On later coming to power at Gondar, Ras Mikael Sehul took a harder line with the Na'ib, reportedly warning him that he would lay waste Hirgigo and Massawa and reduce them "to a desert like Samhar"; traders at Massawa, aware of the Ras's reputation for keeping such threats, fled to Arabia or to Debarwa in response. The Na'ib nonetheless continued to withhold dues from both Ethiopia and the Pasha of Jeddah. Bruce observed that the barren Samhar strip behind Massawa and Hirgigo was seasonally abandoned by its herding population every year between April and November, during which time it passed effectively into Ethiopian hands, allowing the governor of Tigray and the Bahr Negash to blockade the ports and cut off their supplies without ever needing to march an army against them.

The core region of the Mereb Melash, Hamasen, was for centuries led mostly by two rival families from the villages of Hazega and Tsazega. The local elite groups enjoyed relative independence. Despite this, Tigrayan lords at various points subdued and exercised authority over the region. In 1795, Emperor Takla Giyorgis I appointed Wolde Selassie ruler of all the country from the Angarab river, just outside Gondar, to Massawa, an area corresponding to the greater Bambolo Mellash, while Sabagadis Woldu and Wube Haile Maryam similarly held authority over the region in subsequent decades. Hamasen was one of the sub-provinces of the Tigray sub-kingdom in this period, alongside Shire, Adwa and Aksum, Tembien, Inderta and Agame, whose leading families kept aligning and realigning in attempts to control it. The governors of Tigray were normally appointed by the court at Gondar or sought its confirmation of their office.

Sabagadis specifically exercised his authority over the region through local intermediaries rather than direct rule: having subdued Mereb Melash, he appointed Embet Ellen, wife of the Hazzega lord Solomon, as ruler over the whole of Hamasen. Following Sabagadis's death in 1831, the old rivalries of Mereb Melash broke out again, and Ellen secured the backing of Wube Haile Maryam, who confirmed her in office.

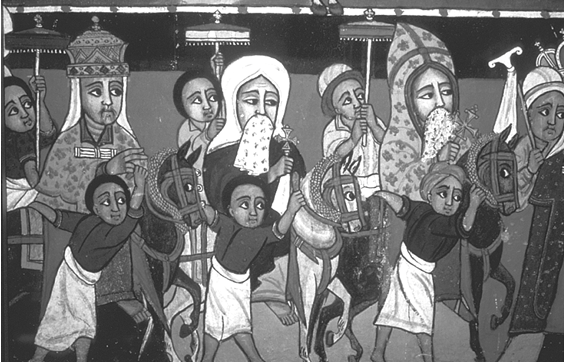
Wube Haile Maryam with his wife and abuna Salama; Darasge Maryam Church

Wube had briefly been Sabagadis's son-in-law, marrying his daughter Denqe, but switched allegiance to the Warrasek ruler Mareyye Gugsa in 1831 after feeling abandoned by him; when Sabagadis invaded Semen that year to reverse the betrayal he was defeated and killed, after which Wube crushed Sabagadis's sons and had consolidated control over the whole of Tigray by 1835.

In Hamasen itself, the Encyclopaedia Aethiopica describes him as the de facto head of the region between 1839 and 1855, a period in which he put down a rebellion of local Hamasen chiefs in a battle near Gura and afterward installed a local chief as his deputy over the Karnessem district. The town of Keren, for example, had previously been administered by local notables paying tribute to the governor of Hamasen while guarding their own autonomy, an arrangement only broken by Wube's raids in the 1840s, after which Keren still paid tribute to Hamasen rather than to Wube directly. Wube also extended this pressure toward the coast as Egyptian power grew there, raiding Bogos and the approaches to Hergigo; in 1849, his troops attacked Hergigo and looted Catholic mission property at Emkullu, where the French consul also kept his house. The attack came in early January 1849. Wube had reportedly demanded that the Egyptians leave Hergigo and Emkullu within forty-eight hours, hand over the Na'ib and pay him 2,000 thalers a year as his share of the trade taxes. When the governor refused, an army of 2,000 to 3,000 men led by Wube's general Kokebe and two of Wube's sons burned and looted Hergigo and Emkullu, including the property of the consuls and the Catholic mission, but made no serious attempt to take the Egyptian fort or cross to Massawa. The governor later reportedly paid a ransom of 12,000 thalers. Rubenson argues that for Wube, as for the other parties, the struggle over Massawa was about how to share the revenue of the trade, not about sovereignty. In a letter to Queen Victoria that Walter Plowden inspired, Wube said that Massawa had belonged to his ancestors in earlier days, that the na'ibs had once paid tribute regularly but had stopped, and that he had therefore sent an army to drive the Turks back to Massawa.

The integration of Mereb Melash into the Ethiopian imperial system is further confirmed by documentary evidence: the province is listed in the tax records of Emperor Tewodros II as one of the northern provinces paying tribute to the crown, alongside Welkait and other Tigrinya-speaking territories not considered part of Tigray proper.

The scale of this tribute was considerable: of the roughly 200,000 Maria Theresa thalers Tewodros collected annually from Tigray and its dependent regions of Hamasen, Seraye and Akele Guzai, about 32,000 thalers, or over 16 percent, came from Hailu Tewolde Medhin's government of Hamasen and Seraye alone, compared with under 50,000 thalers from the whole of Begemder.

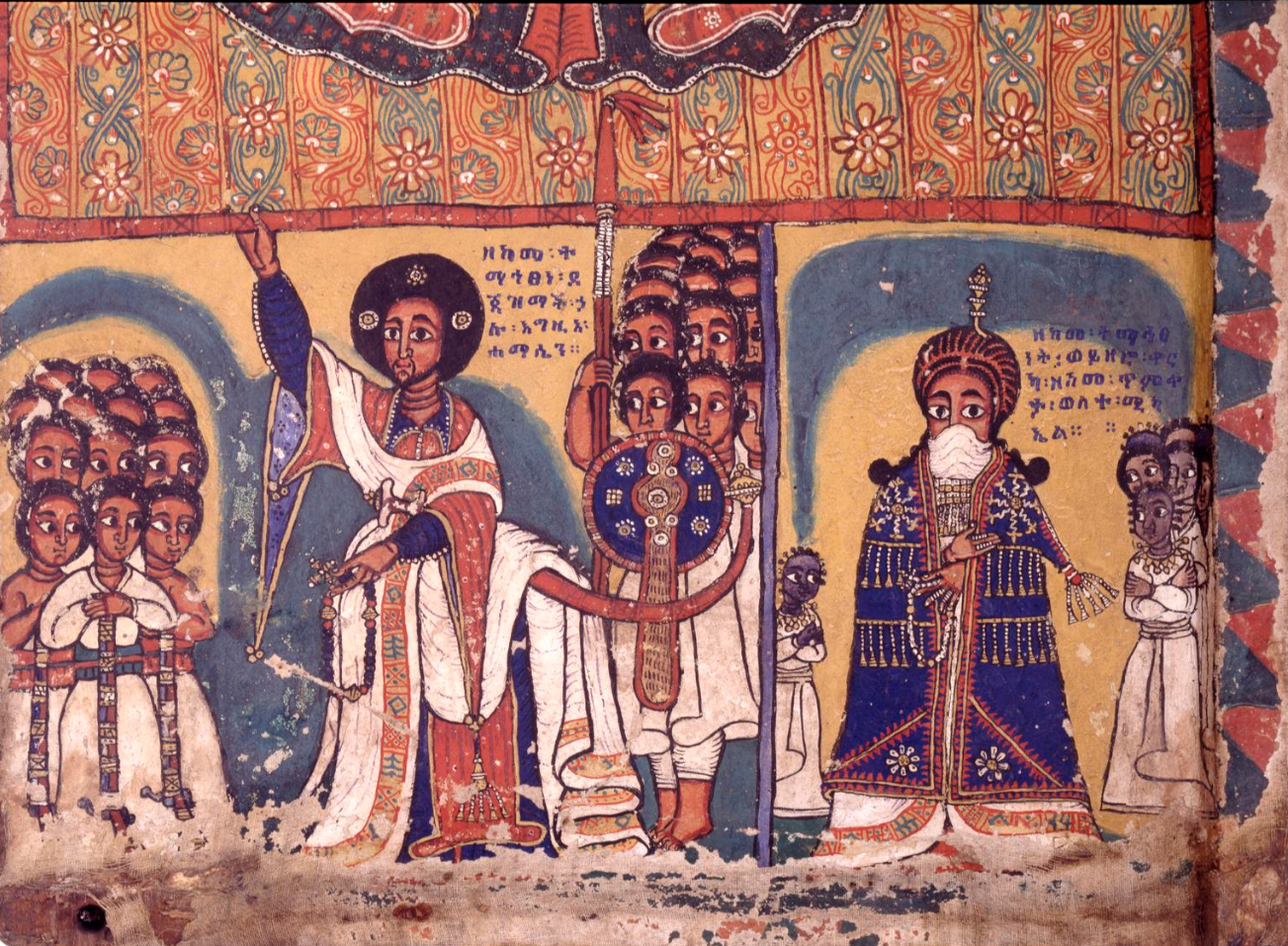
Dejazmatch Hailu Tewolde Medhin of Hamasen with his wife Warka

From the late 18th to mid-19th centuries, there was a long-standing rivalry between the rival Hazega and Tsazega villages. Ato Tewoldemedhin of Tsazega constantly fought to reduce his rivals to obedience. His son, Dejazmatch Hailu Tewolde Medhin, had governed Hamasen since the 1830s. The Encyclopaedia Aethiopica describes him as "a local lord and an ally of ase Tewodros II," and he was eventually forced to flee to Gondar to seek the Emperor's support during the factional fighting.

Tewodros and, before his coronation, Yohannes IV supported Hailu in restoring the governor-generalship over the whole Mereb Melash that had once been exercised by the Bahr Negash. In Akkele Guzai, an assembly of nominally elected notables had long governed as direct tributaries of the emperor until Wube imposed civil-military governors in the 1840s; to recover their powers, the families that had held these offices allied with Wolde Mikael Solomon of Hazzega against Hailu. In September 1858, Hailu fought in Hamasen on the Emperor's behalf, and later pushed back on the Egyptian advance.

In the first years of Tewodros's reign, Hailu and the governors of Adiyabo seem to have pushed Egyptian positions back somewhat: the Egyptian governor of Taka gave up Kufit in 1857, and by 1859 most tribes between Massawa and Kassala paid tribute only to Ethiopia. Rubenson sees no evidence of a wider Ethiopian policy of aggression against Egypt, and points out that Egypt was then reducing or withdrawing garrisons from outlying posts to save money. In 1860, he was reinstated as ruler of Hamasien and Seraye. He maintained this loyalty for years: a letter from Emnata Maryam to Antoine d'Abbadie on 3 October 1867 described him as "the only one loyal to the king." Only as Tewodros's position collapsed did Haylu switch allegiance to Kassa Mercha, the future Yohannes IV, no later than 1 October 1867, when Hailu sent a messenger to the British reconnaissance party that had just arrived at Massawa. By then he had given up his loyalty to Tewodros and joined Kassa, who had declared himself independent ruler of all Tigray a few months earlier. In December 1868, Kassa Mercha imprisoned him on account of his secret dealings with Egypt, and appointed Wolde Mikael Solomon in his place. (Note: Rubenson, citing Douin, places Kassa's action against Hailu probably in July 1868 rather than December, and says Kassa acted because he suspected Hailu of being open to Egyptian influence. Caulk instead says Hailu was removed on suspicion of intriguing with Werner Munzinger, then French consul at Massawa, who was trying to detach the notables of the Mereb Melash from their allegiance to the empire; he also says that Wolde Mikael, promoted dejazmach in September 1868, still had to share the government of Hamasen with other local notables.)

=== Mid-nineteenth century and the shift to Asmara ===
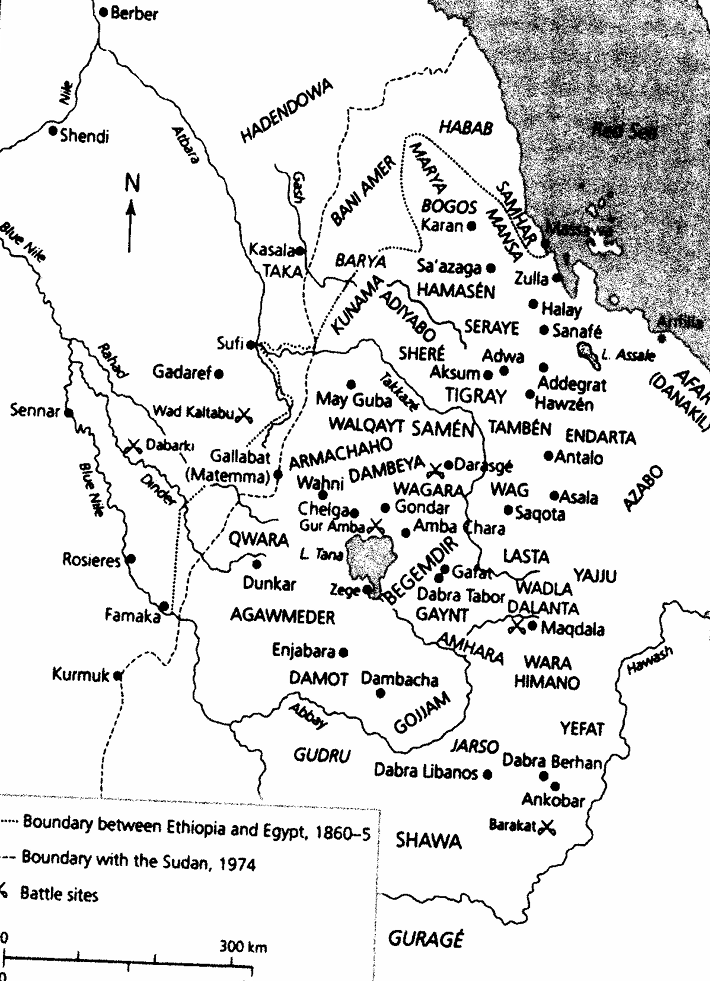
Map of Ethiopia at the time of Emperor Tewodros II (1855-1868)

Emperor Tewodros became the first nineteenth-century Ethiopian ruler to make a concerted effort to recover the port. As early as June 1855, only four months after his coronation, he informed British consul Plowden of his intention to make himself master of the coastal tribes and, if possible, seize Massawa. The British Foreign Secretary Lord Clarendon was persuaded to concur with an Ethiopian annexation, but the plan came to nothing when it became clear the Ottomans would not cede the port.

The frontier between the highlands and the coast was never clearly drawn. A contested zone stretched from Qallabat to the neighborhood of Massawa, where some tribes acknowledged both Egypt and Ethiopia as overlords. Munzinger explained the position of the Semhar tribes this way:

The Abyssinians have no need to conquer a country which nature has given to them without further ado. Thus the inhabitants of Semhar live under a double dependence, that of Abyssinia for grazing, of Massawa for trade, of both for security. They therefore pay tribute to both and when people say that Semhar belongs to the Turks, they are telling only half the truth.

The British consul Cameron also learned that Tewodros had told the governor of Hamasen to collect tribute as usual but avoid all provocation, and to call for troops from Tigray and resist only if he was attacked.

Caulk takes a more skeptical view of imperial rule in the lowlands. In his assessment, Ethiopian administration had probably never reached down to the coastal plain, although celebrated incursions had been made to the coast for centuries, and in Yohannes's time administration below the north-eastern escarpment consisted mostly of raiding to enforce claims to livestock as taxes. North of Asmara, among the Habab and the peoples of mixed origins around Keren, imperial government had been marked by "neglect and despoliation" from at least the late Zemene Mesafint, with regular campaigns to the coast opposite Massawa and into Bogos while Wube ruled Tigray. The highland core was different: Hamasen, Seraye and Akkele Guzai, the three districts north of the middle Mereb, were still "much attached to the imperial institutions and the Church" when Tewodros restored them.

Debarwa had served for centuries as the residence and seat of the Bahr Negash, but by the middle of the nineteenth century, it had been overshadowed by Asmara, a settlement in Hamasen that had been known since medieval times. In the mid-nineteenth century, the reigning Bahr Negash, Gurade Zaray, who died in 1866, chose Asmara as his headquarters, with the result that the place soon acquired a position similar to that earlier held by Debarwa.

Asmara at this period was a modest settlement. Visitors described its buildings as cave-like dwellings dug into the soil and covered by terraces on a level with the higher ground, closed in front by dry-stone walls, with a single opening serving simultaneously as door, window, and chimney. Furniture was minimal, consisting mainly of large seats cut into the earth beside the walls and covered with ox-hides. The traveller Wylde estimated the population at around 5,000 inhabitants.

=== Egyptian–Ethiopian War ===
The enduring prestige of the Bahr Negash office was acknowledged even by Ethiopia's rivals during this period. When Egypt established its own Red Sea province in 1866, its deputy in the Semhar plains was deliberately given the new title Naýib Al-Bahr, styled directly after the Bahr Negash title, reflecting Egyptian recognition of the institution's historical legitimacy. Hasan Rifat, who took over Massawa on 30 April 1866, soon located 39 mostly coastal tribes that he considered dependent on the port. Of these, 25 paid a combined tribute of a little over 5,000 thalers a year and 14 paid nothing. He saw richer prospects inland: a salt mine under a Christian chief reportedly yielded 100,000 to 150,000 thalers a year, and the tribute that could be claimed from Hailu of Hamasen (and Bogos) was alleged to be worth 62,000 thalers a year. Egyptian officials took it for granted that they could easily annex Akkele Guzai and Bogos, where Catholic missionaries had weakened loyalty to Ethiopia and created an informal protectorate under France or Britain. To keep the Europeans out, Hasan Rifat asked his government to "take urgent measures in view of making France and England officially recognize that this Christian region depends on Abyssinia alone and that they have no right whatsoever to intervene in its affairs".

When Kassa Mircha (later Yohannes IV) assumed power over Tigray and Mereb Melash as Dejazmatch in 1867, he inherited a province whose local rulers had already developed a pattern of seeking foreign patrons against each other. Woldemichael Solomon, head of the Hazzega family and one of the first to support Kassa, was given the command of Hamasen and Bogos in 1869, but soon fell into Munzinger's orbit and began to send secret letters to France. In one such letter to Napoleon III, Wolde Mikael asserted that he was Hamasen's rightful hereditary ruler through three generations of his family, citing his proximity to Massawa and Bogos and his acquaintance with the French consul. Wolde Mikael, Kassa's governor of Hamasen, Akkele Guzai and Bogos, was encouraged by Munzinger to write, and Munzinger recommended that France answer by inviting an emissary to Paris. The letter is dated 22 August 1869. In it Wolde Mikael admitted that he governed under Kassa, though Rubenson reads the whole initiative as showing a wish to become more independent and secure. When Kassa learned of Wolde Mikael's communications with Napoleon III, he stripped him of his governorship and had him imprisoned at Adwa from late 1869. His son Mekonnin took up arms against Kassa but was reportedly defeated by May 1871.

Kassa's relations with Munzinger himself remained warm through these same years, unlike his falling-out with Wolde Mikael. In September 1869, a rifleman named Yohannis shot Munzinger with a double-barrelled rifle as he travelled between Bogos and Massawa; four bullets struck Munzinger and two more hit his mule, though he survived and recovered. Munzinger blamed the Catholic priest Abba Imnetu, previously active in efforts to place Tigray under French protection, for paying Yohannis to carry out the shooting, and Kassa took personal charge of the resulting inquiry. Writing to Munzinger that November, Kassa expressed sorrow at the attack on his friend and reported that he had already imprisoned Wolde Mikael for plotting against him with Wagshum Gobeze, using the occasion to warn Munzinger against placing too much trust in his rival.

By early January 1870 Kassa had Abba Imnetu placed under arrest, telling Munzinger that harm done to him was harm done to Kassa himself, but a hearing later that month ended in a conditional release after Abba Imnetu argued that the witnesses against him were personal enemies. Munzinger seems to have received the release with some irritation; Kassa explained the following month that it had only been a ploy to draw out Yohannis, who remained at large in Seraye, and assured Munzinger that "your feud is my feud." Both men were back in custody within weeks, and by March 1870 Kassa concluded that Abba Imnetu was guilty and handed him over to Munzinger rather than punish him under Ethiopian law himself, so as to preserve good relations between Ethiopia and foreign powers.

On 23 April 1871, Munzinger himself entered Egyptian service, becoming governor of Massawa and subsequently of the whole northern frontier zone. A month later Munzinger proposed that Egypt annex Bogos, Halhal and Marya, and he believed that the people of Hamasen would be only too happy to come and live as Egyptian subjects in Habab and Barka. After Ismail ordered the annexation of Bogos on 25 March 1872, Munzinger reached Keren on 4 July without meeting resistance. He wrote that he would have liked to occupy Hamasen at once, which he described as the key to Abyssinia, but that he had neither orders from Cairo nor the pretext of an Ethiopian counterattack, and he reported that he had promised emissaries from the province that he would take it later. Writing to Queen Victoria in August 1872, Yohannes IV complained that the Khedive had placed Munzinger Bey in authority over half of Tigray and the empire's border regions, and separately protested that Munzinger's troops had entered Mensa, Halhal and Hamasen, land he considered to lie between Ethiopian and Egyptian territory. In an earlier protest to Ismail, dated 31 July 1872, Yohannes had objected to Munzinger's move into Bogos, Halhal and Hamasen. In the English translation, he wrote:

. . . as I understand, Monsinger Bey [Munzinger] has, by order of Your Highness, collected an army and has entered the countries of Moujess [Bogos], Halhal and Khamassin [Hamasén], which are situated between the Abyssinian and Egyptian territories; Khamassin is the original Capital of Abyssinia . . . from these countries my Kingdom extends as far as the coasts of the Red Sea, we hope that the countries on the coast which have been taken from us may be restored . . . If Your Highness desires to argue respecting the territories in question, you can enquire of the Europeans residing there, and moreover if you wish the friendship between us to be durable, Your Highness must not listen to the sayings of mischievous persons, and that you must also give orders for the withdrawal of your troops, but on the other hand if Your Highness has a design to seize the above-mentioned places, let me know . . .

Writing to the British foreign secretary Earl Granville in May 1873, Yohannes IV set out in detail the territories he considered rightfully Hamasen's: Barya, Sellim Mare'a, Bogos, Habab, Mensa, Aylet, Asgede Beqla, Zula, Tora, Samhar and the country below Anfila, all of which he said Egypt had by then occupied, leaving the province's noblemen only a single district on the plateau. He asked Granville to help him secure an outlet on the coast, insisting that Zula and Anfila had been his territories from early times. By July 1873, Ras Gebre Sadiq was writing to the French consul at Massawa to protest that Munzinger had occupied several named districts of Hamasen: Dekandu, Adi Hamene, Dembe and Mellasenay, with Egyptian troops, years before the outbreak of open war.

The Egyptians first occupied Hamasen in the autumn of 1875, before Wolde Mikael had changed sides. Arendrup landed at Massawa on 26 September and found some 2,500 to 3,000 troops available there. He began his advance on 2 October, reached Asmara on 16 October and Tsazega, the capital of Hamasen, two days later, where a battalion from Keren joined him. The Ethiopian forces of Hamasen and Seraye, about 3,000 men in all, had withdrawn across the Mereb, so the Egyptians met no resistance and reached Gundet on the Mereb by 6 November.

The occupation was not incidental. In a letter of September 1875, the Khedive had outlined plans to organize Hamasen either as a vassal state or an independent government under Egyptian protection, intended as a permanent buffer between Ethiopia and Egypt. Egyptian archival records add that Ismail's orders of 17 September 1875 told Arendrup to invade Hamasen without hesitation and hold it until Yohannes gave satisfactory guarantees for the safety of Egypt's frontiers, and told Arakil to think about the best type of government for the province. Two months later, with Arendrup already at the Mereb, Ismail promised him four more battalions and told him to enter Adwa and make arrangements as if he were going to occupy it permanently. Arendrup was already dead when that order was issued. The Khedive separately promised Wolde Mikael that Egypt would annex neighboring regions to Hamasen and name him their ruler.

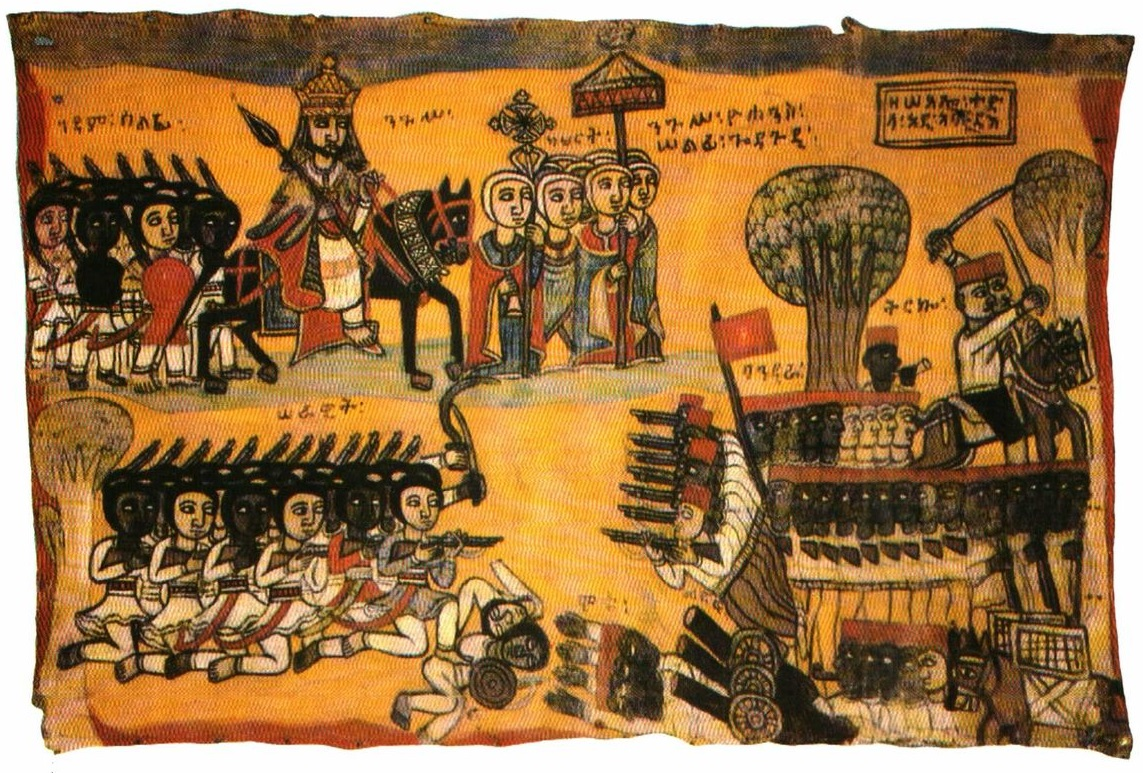
The Battle of Gundet, November 1875, where an Ethiopian army routed the Egyptian force under Arendrup

The first major clash was the Battle of Gundet in November 1875. An Egyptian force of around 2,000 men under the Danish commander Arendrup, which had advanced from Massawa through Hamasen and Seraye, was almost annihilated when an Ethiopian army crossed the Mereb during the night of 15 to 16 November and attacked. Contemporary estimates of 50,000 to 70,000 Ethiopians seem too high to Rubenson, who thinks that even 20,000 to 30,000 would have been a considerable feat given how little time Yohannes had to gather them. Woldemichael Solomon fought on the Ethiopian side at Gundet and was rewarded with the governorship of Hamasen. He was still reporting Egyptian movements to Yohannes in January 1876, though probably on the Egyptians' instructions, and changed sides only in early February, when he turned up in the Egyptian camp instead of obeying Yohannes's summons. In his letter to the French consul, written two days after the battle, Yohannes said unequivocally, "Of all the Egyptians who had invaded my country not a single one has survived; all are dead." He gave a longer account in his letter to Queen Victoria, describing the Egyptians as advancing into Seraye from Hamasen with their camp only six hours' march from Adwa when he went to attack them; when he offered to send the captured Sudanese soldiers back across the frontier, many refused, saying the land belonged to them.

Gundet comprised just one part of a wider Egyptian offensive of four missions ordered between July and September 1875: Arendrup's invasion of Hamasen, Ra'uf Pasha's occupation of Harar, Munzinger's march toward Awsa, and an expedition to the Juba and Benadir coast. The attack in the north was the politically most sensitive of them. Munzinger Pasha marched through Danakil territory with about 400 men and was also meant to push the Shewan king Menelik into attacking Yohannes. He threatened to encircle the highlands from the southern direction, but his force was surprised by the Afar in the early morning of 14 November and wiped out, and Munzinger was among the dead. One of those killed was a cleric from Bagemder who had betrayed Yohannes in favor of Menelik of Shewa to join the force of Munzinger. Ethiopian forces captured about 2,000 to 2,500 breech-loading rifles and fourteen to sixteen cannon and rocket stands at Gundet, and thousands more rifles and fifteen to twenty cannon after Gura. The captured arms helped Yohannes subdue his own interior in the coming years.

Stung by the defeat, the Khedive dispatched a much larger force of roughly 15,000 men under Muhammad Ratib Pasha, advised by American Civil War veterans including General Loring, leading to the three-day Battle of Gura in March 1876. Prince Hasan, the son of the Khedive, came to join the expedition late in December 1875. Ratib traveled on a more easterly line than the one chosen by Arendrup, based on maps and information provided by Catholic missionaries, and by the end of January 1876 reached the area of Gura, some 40 kilometers southeast of Asmara, the farthest he ever got. The proclamation of Ratib invited the governors of Ethiopia to negotiate separate agreements with Egypt and restore the independence they had enjoyed before Tewodros unified the country. There were reports of dissatisfaction in Hamasen, including overtures from Wolde Mikael. When Yohannes summoned Wolde Mikael to his camp in early February, Wolde Mikael defected to the Egyptians instead, probably because he had concluded that Yohannes would be defeated and Ethiopia would lose the lands north of the Mereb. Caulk instead points to Wolde Mikael's discontent: he had not been given the whole of the Mereb Melash, and commanders from Tigray had been sent with him to make sure the escarpment was guarded and that he carried out his orders to drive the Egyptians out of Bogos. The Egyptians rewarded his desertion with a Turkish title, which he converted into ras, and gave two of his sons ranks equivalent to dejazmach; the younger, Mesfin, was sent to be educated in Egypt.

On 7 March, the Ethiopians established themselves between the two Egyptian forts at Gura and Kayakor. Ratib was forced to march out to battle on the open ground, and there his right flank was turned by the Ethiopian columns and his army put to flight. On 8 and 9 March, the Ethiopians laid siege to the fort of Gura, lifting the siege after those two days. Around 3,500 Egyptians were killed or captured in the first hours of the fighting, while 3,500 to 4,000 Ethiopians were killed in the course of three days. Rubenson describes this as a clear victory, although not quite as decisive as Gundet. The Egyptians did not evacuate the territory immediately. Ratib pulled out of the Gura fort later that spring but kept a smaller force at Kayakor until Yohannes made another advance in September 1876. Writing to Ratib Pasha shortly afterward, Yohannes listed Wolde Mikael's betrayal and defection among his grievances, and complained that the Egyptians had also turned the population of Akkele Guzai against him.

After the Battle of Gura, Yohannes did not immediately install Alula. Hamasen was governed in the intervening years by Dejazmatch Gabru Wubet, who held authority over the territory beyond the Mareb from 1871 until 1875. (Note: Caulk gives a different picture, writing that after Yohannes became emperor in January 1872, Hamasen "remained for the next three years under its local notables, principally those of Tsazäga", while Wolde Mikael accompanied the emperor on his campaigns and Hailu stayed in prison.) After Gura, Yohannes reappointed Wolde Mikael's local rival Hailu of Tsazega as governor of Hamasen. Wolde Mikael had ravaged Hamasen after the battle and taken refuge in the lowlands near Aylet, where the Egyptians armed and encouraged him. On 17 July 1876 he invaded Hamasen and killed Hailu Tewolde Medhin at the battle of Weki Dibba near Tsazega, a close fight in which one of his own sons also died. Wolde Mikael then burnt Tsazega and its associated villages, slaughtering all the males he could capture (even infants, according to tradition), although he had bought a number of Tsazega's people before the battle to betray Hailu. The survivors fled to Tigray and towards the coast. Ratib then condemned the attack, and Wolde Mikael protested that he had acted to please the Egyptians and had refused an amnesty and a governorship from Yohannes after Gura, swearing that he had turned the offer down with the words "The water which has been poured out will not flow back into the jug".

Three days before the battle, Ratib had proposed replacing Kayakor with three fortified positions in Hamasen, at Asmara, Tsazega and Debarwa. Ismail meanwhile wanted Yohannes to guarantee Egypt's future frontier by ceding territory, at least Hamasen and possibly everything up to the Mereb, although Rubenson thinks the letter delivered to Adwa was less explicit than Ismail's instructions. In the end no Egyptian troops moved into Hamasen. When the rains ended in September, Yohannes sent armies into Akkele Guzai and Hamasen, Ratib abandoned Kayakor, and Wolde Mikael fled to Bogos with about 1,500 men, leaving the Ethiopians in unchallenged possession of the border provinces. Yohannes then crossed the de facto boundaries of 1872 to 1873 and led an army as far as Keren, without attacking the fort. After the rains of 1876, Yohannes himself crossed the Mereb with the exiled Hamasen nobles and burnt Hazzega in revenge.

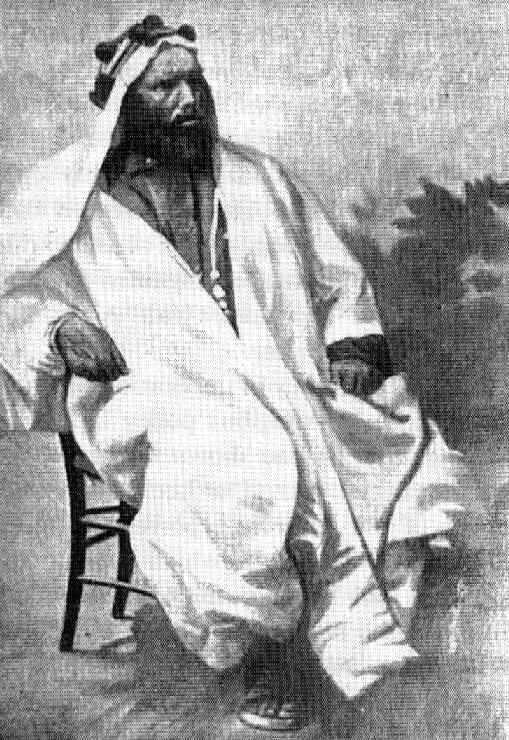
Ras Alula, the governor of Mereb Melash (9 October 1876–1889)

On 9 October 1876, Yohannes appointed Alula (Note: Gabra Mika'el was born in 1847 in the small town of Zuqla, near Mannawe, in the Tamben region of Tigray. He was the fourth among the children of Sengda Qubi and Weyzaro Gerada. In his childhood, he was nicknamed "Wadi Qubi," or "Son of Qubi," after his famous grandfather Qubi. It is believed that the name "Ras Alula" started as a joke: as an arrogant kid, he once asked a group of guests where they were going, and they answered, "We are going to the castle of Ras Alula, Son of Qubi.") to the Mereb Melash and promoted him to Ras. It was the first time in many centuries that an outsider had been placed over the province's established local families. At first Alula's command covered Hamasen and Seraye, with Tesemma Yemam, the son of one of Hailu's partisans, made dejazmach for Hamasen under him, while Yohannes's uncle Ras Araya of Enderta garrisoned Akkele Guzai with Tigrayan soldiers, checking foreign interference along that part of the escarpment. The whole of the Mereb Melash was placed under Alula only after the arrest of Wolde Mikael in December 1879. (Note: The Encyclopaedia Aethiopica describes the 1876 appointment as covering the whole Mereb Melash from the start.)

Yohannes normally left provincial government to local nobles but placed outsiders in charge in the exposed northern provinces; in 1875 Hamasen's governor was already an outsider, Dejazmatch Gebru, a wagshum. After the battle of Weki Dibba neither the Hazega nor the Tsazega families supplied a governor again, and the post went to Alula from Tembien, who ruled with a heavy hand. As Caulk puts it, Yohannes "quickly discovered in the 1870s that no set of appointments which he could make in the Märäb-Mellash satisfied all important claimants there", and in the end imposed his authority "by an alien garrison and governor". Alula was promoted directly from the rank of shalaqa, (Note: The Ethiopian army equivalent of Major.) and his rise provoked resentment among the Tigrayan nobility; one rival, Dejazmatch Debeb Araya, (Note: Alula and Debeb had a shared origin: in 1868 the young Alula entered the household of Ras Ar'aya Demgu, Debeb's father, as an ashkar (retainer), where he first met both Debeb and Ar'aya's daughter Emlasu. He was later passed to Ar'aya's nephew, the future Yohannes IV, then still Dadjazmach Kassa, serving first as a chamberlain and doorkeeper (elfegn kalkay) and then as agafari, organizer of the royal table, before his military career began.) harassed his administration as a shefta along the Massawa coast until submitting in 1888.

Debeb's rebellion dated from the end of 1881, when he refused Yohannes's summons to court, apparently resenting the modesty of his title of fitawrari (commander of the advance guard). With a band of a few hundred Asawurta (Note: One of the Saho-speaking groups in Eritrea.) he attacked Ethiopian caravans and sold the loot openly in Massawa; the Egyptians began paying him a monthly stipend in 1883, but banished him to Suakin after he robbed a caravan belonging to his own sister, whom Yohannes had married to Alula. Caulk explains Debeb's particular hatred of Alula by Alula's rapid rise despite his peasant origins.

Alula was then authorized to crush the remaining opposition in the province, which resulted in the defeat of the followers of Woldemichael Solomon. But, Woldemichael, with Egyptian backing, repeatedly regained control of the Mereb Melash whenever Alula was recalled south to assist Emperor Yohannes, holding the province from April 1877 until September 1878 before again retreating when new governors arrived. In December 1878, Woldemichael submitted to Emperor Yohannes. He was then confirmed as Ras in an effort to appease him, remaining as governor under Alula's authority. Rubenson's account differs in emphasis. In late 1877, the Egyptians had built Wolde Mikael up until he commanded about 6,000 men with 3,000 Remington rifles. Gordon found him in a stronghold north of Keren, surrounded by what looked like fully 7,000 men. Wolde Mikael refused to ask for a pardon, and Gordon had to promise him 1,000 pounds a month in return for an undertaking to stop plundering. In 1878 Wolde Mikael invaded and looted Hamasen and Seraye, but with Alula approaching and no Egyptian reinforcements coming, he negotiated an amnesty with Alula and received his pardon from Yohannes at Gondar in January 1879. Rumors that he would be given a governorship again proved false. About six months after the pardon he returned to Hamasen and Bogos with Alula, and he served as Alula's lieutenant in 1879.

Once Alula and his troops had gone south, Wolde Mikael and his lieutenants had swept down on Hamasen, Seraye and Akkele Guzai, carrying off 30,500 head of cattle and much plunder from merchants, and the punitive expeditions Yohannes sent into the Mereb Melash after the rains of 1878 were so harsh that Wolde Mikael came begging to Alula to reconcile him with the emperor. When he was pardoned at Debre Tabor in January 1879, (Note: Rubenson places the pardon at Gondar.) his illegal title was confirmed and he was made Alula's junior colleague beyond the Mereb, and in August 1879 he marched through Bogos on Yohannes's behalf collecting taxes in defiance of the Egyptians.

Historian Zewde Gebre-Sellassie's chronology has Wolde Mikael killing Ras Bariau Gabre-Tsadiq in May 1877 after being sent fresh supplies of arms from Osman Pasha Rifki, who was the deputy governor of Sudan. On the contrary the Encyclopaedia Aethiopica dates the battle that claimed his life in 1878 which took place at a site known as Bet Maqa, which corresponds to today's village of Haz Haz, a name meaning "catch catch" in reference to the engagement. Rubenson's account supports the later date. Bariau, Yohannes's governor of Tigray at Adwa, wrote to Gordon on 11 May 1878 to ask whether Wolde Mikael's invasion had Gordon's permission. When Gordon returned to Massawa from Harar, he found that Wolde Mikael had just killed Bariau and that Egyptian subordinates had supplied Wolde Mikael with ammunition, possibly on orders from Cairo. Caulk also dates the ambush to May 1878 and places it between Asmara and Bet Maqa, where Bariau had come in person to end the rebels' raids on Alula's provinces. (Note: Caulk's text says Bariau was killed "at the end of May", while his note gives the date as the 20th.)

In the 1870s, Akkele Guzai was incorporated as a sub-province of Marab Mallash under Ras Alula Engeda, before regaining its status as a separate province in its own right in the 1880s and recovering a degree of its traditional autonomy. Warfare and famine also virtually depopulated Hamasen during this period. Twelve years of intermittent fighting, raiding and looting impoverished the whole borderland. Regular armies and private gangs alike requisitioned or looted grain and livestock, cultivation was disrupted, and famine and epidemics reduced the population. Thousands of people migrated south and west or fled to the lowlands and Massawa. One missionary reported that a group of destitute peasants from Hamasen, looking for land and food, fought a regular battle with the local people in Wag, and the Swedish mission at Massawa did much of its early work among refugees from Hamasen. When the people of Tsazega appealed to Gordon, they said the worst thing Wolde Mikael's troops did was not the killing and looting but that he spent a rainy season driving them out of their country. As early as March 1877, Gordon had written:

The war has pressed very heavily on the Abyssinian frontier peasantry . . . the soldiery, when they come down to attack us, pillage every one, whether friends or foes. This having gone on for nearly eighteen months, the peasantry are nearly ruined, and are as anxious for peace as even Egypt is.

Gordon's 1877 proposals had treated the old frontier as a line between Hamasen and Bogos, although Alula had stated plainly that Ethiopia extended to the sea. Gordon also hoped to settle the Wolde Mikael problem by giving him a district of his own made up of the two Maryas and Bet Teqwe, separated from Ethiopia by an Egyptian corridor from Massawa to Kassala through Keren. When Gordon's deputy Winstanley finally reached Debre Tabor in mid-April 1879, Yohannes answered the question of a port with the words "I do not wish a consul at Massowah – I wish Massowah".

That summer Alula appeared on the northern frontier with a large army (30,000 combatants according to the French vice-consul Raffray), with the pardoned Wolde Mikael as his lieutenant. The Ethiopians overran Bogos, Mensa and Marya without resistance and demanded tribute from Semhar, Habab and Barka. Alula was reported to have said that he had come to take Massawa and would not leave until his horse had drunk from the Red Sea. When Gordon reached Alula's camp at Gura on 14 September 1879, Alula refused to settle anything but agreed to refrain from hostilities while Gordon traveled to Debre Tabor to meet Yohannes.

Finally in December 1879, Alula imprisoned Woldemichael and convinced Yohannes to have him jailed in Tigray, eliminating the last hereditary local chief of Hamasen. Alula, resenting so equal a partner, had turned Wolde Mikael's nephew against him and obtained testimony that he was negotiating with the Egyptians. Tried before the emperor at Debre Tabor in January 1880, Wolde Mikael was sent with his son Mesfin to the royal prison at Amba Salama in Tembien, and Alula governed the whole Mereb Melash with troops from Tigray and loyalists from the local gentry, those of Seraye and Akkele Guzai being particularly glad to be rid of the lords of Hazzega and Tsazega.

Wolde Mikael remained detained through the rest of Yohannes's reign and was only released on the eve of the Metemma campaign in 1888; he subsequently lived out his remaining years in Axum, where he was buried in 1905. (Note: Caulk gives the year of his death as 1906. He also writes that Wolde Mikael "remained on the sidelines in the struggles of the north until released to fight against the Italians in 1895–96", although elsewhere he describes Wolde Mikael in 1888–89 urging his son-in-law Kefle Iyasus to bring the Italians onto the highlands and declining offers from both Debeb and Mangasha.) Alula then imposed central government and experimented with land reform aimed at establishing his followers from Tigray, many originating from his home region of Tamben, as Hamasen's new elite, while cultivating commercial relations with Muslim traders and attempting to renew trade with Massawa.

After the rains of 1880, Alula returned to the disputed districts to collect the annual tribute, and his men plundered even around the Egyptian fort at Keren. Yohannes did not restrain Alula and his other northern governors, whose armies moved freely and levied tribute in all the territories lost between 1872 and 1875, and Alula saw to it that no revenue from those districts reached Egypt.

Alula kept the Egyptians cooped up in their forts near Keren while he toured the Anseba valley and nearby farming areas demanding taxes in cattle and grain from the Bilen, Mensa, Beni Amer and Bet Asgede. Those who refused, having already paid the Egyptians or not wishing to pay at all, were attacked unless they fled to the mountains, and the Egyptians came out afterwards to make further exactions and to punish those who had not resisted paying the emperor's taxes. At times Alula reportedly blighted farmland in areas through which he feared the Egyptians might advance.

In a letter Yohannes wrote to Mahdist commander Hamdan Abu Anja in December 1888, reflecting on the war with Egypt, he described it himself:

"They come via Massawa and entered Hamasen. I fought them. God gave me power and I defeated them in two battles."

=== Hewett Treaty and Italian occupation ===
The Hewett Treaty was signed in June 1884 by Emperor Yohannes IV, Queen Victoria (represented by Rear-Admiral Sir William Hewett), and the Khedive (through Mason Bey, governor of Massawa). The terms of the treaty included the exemption of goods transiting via Massawa, such as arms, from any duties; the restoration of the province of Bogos to Ethiopia once Egyptian troops had been withdrawn from Kassala, Amedib, and Senhit; the provision of free passage for the retreating Egyptian garrisons to the coast; permission for Ethiopia to recruit bishops from Alexandria; and the referral of any disputes between the two states to Britain. A companion treaty signed the same day committed both rulers to ending the slave trade, requiring British patrols to return any freed Ethiopian found aboard a slaving vessel.

Ras Alula had been actively involved in the formulation of the treaty and, according to British reports, was fully in favor of it. Emperor Yohannes IV, however, was reportedly skeptical and only agreed to meet with the British mission in the final week of May, signing on 3 June 1884. Hewett had left Massawa for Adwa on 7 April with the Egyptian governor of Massawa, an American named Mason, and Alula met them at Asmara and escorted them to Adwa, where Yohannes kept them waiting for a month. Once he arrived, the negotiations took only a few days. Hewett had gone beyond the initial discussions to engage in real negotiations with Alula while waiting for the emperor, and thus many things had already been sorted out when Yohannes appeared. The significance of the treaty to Alula and Yohannes was that the trade of arms through Massawa should only be done to the advantage of the emperor, and that renegades would no longer enjoy foreign protection.

The Encyclopaedia Aethiopica notes that the British ultimately interpreted the treaty wording as an Ethiopian abandonment of their claim to Massawa, a reading that served British strategic interests in preventing French domination of the Red Sea by allowing Italy to fill the vacuum left by the Egyptian retreat. According to Rubenson, however, the terms of the treaty were more favorable to Ethiopia than the instructions given by Hewett: firstly, the two clauses that mattered most to Ethiopia, on free transit and on Bogos, were placed first; secondly, Article II spoke of the country of Bogos being restored rather than the mere occupation of a district by Yohannes, which suggests that the extent of the territory was discussed. As the coastline was passed over in silence and Yohannes was not asked to recognize any Egyptian claim, it remained an open question for the future. In its bare terms, the treaty constituted a diplomatic triumph for Ethiopia, comparable to Gundet and Gura in that the lost territories were returned and Massawa became in practice an Ethiopian port.

Within a few months all three clauses that mattered most to Ethiopia were breached: Keren was not handed over by Egypt, which did not want to give up Kassala; harassment continued at Massawa; and Yohannes's cousin, Debeb Araya, was brought from Suakin to Massawa for trial under the extradition clause and allowed to escape. (Note: According to one of Yohannes's chroniclers, Debeb eluded his guards early in October 1884 and swam to the mainland to rejoin his band. Yohannes protested to the British that this was a "disgraceful" breach of the treaty, whose Article V promised Debeb's extradition, and in November 1887 Alula reminded the British envoy Gerald Portal of the same clause, calling for Debeb's arrest: "If a single criminal standing between two governments is destroyed, their friendship will be stronger and merchants can trade normally".) Yohannes himself did not treat the matter as settled: within weeks he wrote asking Victoria to put Hewett's verbal proposal to split Massawa's customs revenue in writing, and complained directly to the Khedive that the status of Massawa remained unresolved despite the port having recently been taken from him.

In late 1884, recognising the new opportunities presented by the Hewett Treaty, Alula moved his capital within the Mereb Melash from Addi Taqlay to the small trade center of Asmara, which was better positioned for developing the commercial route to Massawa.

On 20 October 1884, three months after the treaty was ratified, Lord Granville had sounded out Italy's ambassador in London about an Italian occupation of Massawa. Massawa was taken over by Italy in early February 1885, about eight months after the signing of the Hewett Treaty. (Note: The date is given as 3 February by Pankhurst and as 5 February, when Italian troops landed, by Rubenson.)

In one of the letters sent to Queen Victoria, six months after the arrival of the Italians, Yohannes explained his grievances. According to the agreement, the Egyptian garrisons should have relinquished their armory as they departed, but they only left behind a few cannons. Yohannes had gone to great lengths, paying from his own pocket for their provisioning and ensuring that they departed from Ethiopia safely, acting in good faith throughout. The Italians, however, immediately moved into Massawa, which Yohannes claimed was rightfully part of his ancestral territory. The Italians also denied him the passage of rifles and pushed patrols toward his territories where the Salt pan were located. Yohannes wanted to know from the queen whether she had consented to the occupation, and demanded that Massawa be returned to him.

At the local level the quarrel was sharper still. Alula was particularly annoyed that Italian troops had taken over the small fort at Se'ati, about 30 kilometers from Massawa, and raised their flag there when the Egyptians left in August 1885. He told them that "the country belongs to the King", that it was not his to give away, and that they should clear out of Se'ati. He did not recognize Italian rights to Massawa, much less to Se'ati, and wondered why the British let them stay and threaten his frontiers.

On 23 September 1885, Alula marched west and engaged a Mahdist force under the amir Uthman Diqna at the Battle of Kufit. The Mahdist army which was estimated at between 6,000 and 12,000 men, was routed; between 3,000 and 5,500 Mahdists were killed, at a cost of around 1,500 Ethiopians, including most of Alula's senior commanders. After his victory, Alula considered advancing to relieve the besieged Egyptians at Kassala, but the gathering Italian presence on the coast was, in Erlich's analysis, the main reason he chose not to proceed.

Kufit became the first instance of Alula commanding an imperial army on the border without the emperor accompanying him, with only his subordinate Blatta Gabru among the notable Tigrayan nobility present. Figures for the troops he commanded range from 8,000 to 20,000 soldiers. According to Haylu, an Ethiopian interpreter in Italian employ who visited the encampment before the battle, he commanded 10,000 men, "all armed with Remingtons." This led to him being called "Abba Nagga," an epithet that can still be found in a song kept at Debre Bizen monastery.

Among those killed at Kufit was Alula's best lieutenant, Blatta Gabru, whose command over Bogos and the former Egyptian forts at Keren passed to Alula's son-in-law, Dejazmatch Hayla Sellase. Early in October 1885, Alula's candidate for the leadership of the Habab, Kantiba Hamid, went to Massawa rather than answer at Asmara for failing to join the Kufit campaign, and on 9 October he and his rival brother Haddad signed a treaty of protection with the Italian commander, General Tancredi Saletta. Alula demanded that the Italians hand Hamid over, as the Hewett Treaty required, but was ignored.

In a letter to Menelik that leaked to the Italian envoy Pietro Antonelli, who reported it to Rome on 26 November 1885, Yohannes wrote of the Italians:

They [the Italians] are not a serious people; they are intriguers; and all this must be something which the English are doing to me. The Italians have not come to these parts because they lack pasture and abundance in their own country, but they come here because of ambition, in order to aggrandize themselves, because they are many and not rich. But with the help of God, they shall leave again humiliated and disappointed and with their honour lost before all the world. They are not a people who can frighten us; . . . If the two of us always remain united, we shall with the help of God overcome not only the weak Italians, but also the strong people of other nations. As Adam wanted to enjoy the forbidden fruit because of ambition to become greater than God, and instead found nothing but chastisement and dishonour, so it will happen to the Italians.

Frustrated and distrustful of the local tribes, Alula permitted his men to massacre many of the Nara and Kunama tribesmen in November 1886. Between August and November 1886, Alula raided the Habab and the disloyal Barya clans west of Keren, carrying the emperor's armies and their Beni-Amer allies once more as far as Kufit. The Beni Amer had joined Alula to relieve Kassala and kept up the alliance for over a year after the town fell to the Mahdists in August 1885; only after this campaign did Alula leave them to make their own peace with Uthman Diqna. (Note: The Encyclopaedia Aethiopica says instead that Alula embittered the Beni Amer.) While Alula was raiding west of Keren in late November 1886, the Italians sent a detachment of irregulars to the strategic wells at Wia in Asawurta country, on the route that led up from Massawa to Akkele Guzai.

In January 1887, before the fighting began, Alula wrote to the Italian military commandant General Gene demanding the withdrawal of Italian troops from the post at Uaa by the 21st of that month and from Zula within one month, warning that "if friendship is to continue, you must do this. Otherwise, you must know that friendship is at an end." Gene refused, replying that his soldiers would remain at Uaa because "they are necessary for the peace of the country." Within a fortnight, conflict broke out.

Alula's longtime rival Dejazmatch Kefle Iyasus defected to the Italian side just days before this battle, a move that likely pushed Alula to strike first. (Note: Caulk, who calls him Kaffäl Goffar and identifies him as a son-in-law of Wolde Mikael Solomon, dates his turn to the Italians earlier: by the end of September 1885 his flirtations with Alula and then with Uthman Diqna had given way to overtures to the Italian commander, General Saletta.) On 23 January 1887, Alula launched a direct assault on the fortified Italian base at Saati; hundreds of Ethiopians died under Italian artillery fire, at a cost of only four Italian casualties. On 26 January, at the Battle of Dogali, he encircled a 500-man Italian column marching to relieve Saati and routed it; only about eighty wounded Italians managed to escape. Whether Yohannes had ordered the attack was unclear: a letter he wrote to the Italian commander that same day still spoke of seeking a peaceful resolution, even as Alula later told Italian officials he had acted on the emperor's explicit orders.

Dogali is considered one of the most important events in late nineteenth-century Ethiopian history, since it entrenched the enmity between Italy and Yohannes and so contributed to the eventual dominance of the Shoans under Menelik. Rubenson argues that the clash was not a misunderstanding: although the Hewett Treaty set no boundaries, Yohannes had been promised verbally that Se'ati would be evacuated, and the Italians knew it. Yohannes also wrote to London and Paris to protest Italy's claim to inherit territories that Egypt had restored to Ethiopia under the treaty. Britain then sent Gerald Portal to mediate, but Italy's terms included an apology for Alula's attack, the cession of Se'ati, Wi'a and Aylet, recognition of an Italian protectorate over the Habab and Asawirta, and a joint Italian and British reoccupation of Bogos including the fort at Keren. When Portal hinted that Yohannes might distance himself from Alula, Yohannes replied that Alula had done no wrong, and said that there would be no conditions beyond those agreed at Adwa in 1884.

In January 1888 an Italian force was entrenched around Saati, facing Yohannes's imperial army directly. The Ethiopians could not storm the Italian positions or draw them into the open. On 25 March 1888, Alula rode up to the Italian fortifications in full ceremonial dress, a gold crown and gilded shield among them, and challenged the garrison to come out and fight; when the Italians refused, he withdrew. According to Italian observers, the appearance of an Italian observation balloon over the battlefield panicked the Ethiopian rank and file, several of whom reportedly fled rather than face what they took for a heavenly army.

Early in March, Yohannes had moved his headquarters to Gudofalassi, between the Mereb and Asmara, and in a letter from Aylet on 26 March he disavowed Alula's attack at Dogali, called on the Italians to respect the Hewett Treaty and proposed an alliance against the Mahdists; the talks broke down when the Italian commander, San Marzano, insisted on an immediate formal cession of territory and an Italian protectorate over the Asawurta and Habab. After exhausting their supplies, the imperial army began its retreat on the night of 2–3 April 1888, and in the second week of April Yohannes recrossed the Mereb to Adwa, leaving Alula to cover the withdrawal. (Note: The Encyclopaedia Aethiopica places the retreat in late March 1888.)

The failure at Saati, coming so soon after Dogali, led Yohannes to seriously consider removing Alula from the governorship altogether; his brother Dejazmatch Tasamma was stripped of office and had his property confiscated, and even the late crown prince Ar'aya Sellase reportedly urged his father not to heed Alula's counsel any further. Only the outbreak of the Mahdist invasion of Amhara, which required Alula's generalship on a new front, kept him in place. The Mahdist leadership under Caliph Abdullahi eventually declared a holy war on Ethiopia, which in turn fed into the pressures that led Yohannes to march on the Mahdists at Matamma, where he died in March 1889.

Rubenson places Yohannes's decision to leave the Italians alone in the context of the Mahdist threat. Yohannes already knew that the Mahdists had defeated the Gojjam army on 18 January 1888 and sacked Gondar. He proposed that the Italians join him against the Mahdists and got no reply. Aware of how hard it was to capture a fortified position, and probably disturbed by exaggerated stories of an alliance between the Italians and Menelik, he decided to leave the Italians alone for the time being while making clear that he did not renounce his claims. He made his position clear in these words:

‘Has not Christ distributed [the earth] and made peace? Your country is from the sea as far as Rome, mine is from the sea as far as here; this is Ethiopia. There is no reason for us to quarrel.

One of the main reasons for the collapse of Mereb Melash was the combination of internal rivalry and external pressure. Caulk sees the first as the decisive one. In his view, the province was not lost because of any new opportunism by the Shewans, but because Menelik could not hold back the forces pulling the north apart as Yohannes had done, and "civil war in Tegray was the essential condition for the partition". He calls Wolde Mikael Solomon, who made extensive use of Hamasen's unusual access to foreign allies, "the archetype of the bad baron". He also argues that the devastation of the Christian peasants north of the Mereb by Wolde Mikael's raids and the punitive expeditions sent against him, of a kind usually reserved for frontier peoples of questionable loyalty, "was the true prelude to the founding of Eritrea". What Caulk calls Alula's "wise government" made up for this for a while, but it "proved only a brief interlude".

One such rival was Debeb Araya, a Tigrayan noble who resented Yohannes's choice to appoint an outsider over Mereb Melash's own established local families rather than one of their own. Debeb had placed his band under Italian protection by January 1886. (Note: Bahru Zewde writes that by 1888 Debeb was working with the Italians.) When Yohannes massed his armies in the Mereb Melash at the beginning of 1888, Debeb obtained arms and command over a number of irregulars from the Italians, then went over to the emperor's camp towards the end of February, carrying many Italian rifles with him. After the failure at Saati, Yohannes made him dejazmach and governor of Akkele Guzai independent of Alula, and in August 1888 Debeb repulsed an Italian-led attack on his residence at Segeneiti, a reverse that so alarmed the Italian war ministry that Crispi and the Massawa command could not get approval for an advance into the highlands for nearly a year.

When the Mahdist army, led by Hamdan Abu Anja, invaded Amhara and destroyed Gondar in early 1888, Yohannes, urged on by his clergy and senior officers, including Alula, decided it was time to abandon the standoff with the Italians and turn to face the Mahdists. On 14 June 1888, Alula left Asmara with barely a thousand soldiers to join the emperor. This was the last time he ever left Asmara to govern the province. Yohannes later told Italian emissaries that he had recalled Alula from the escarpment facing Massawa as a sign of his wish for peace, leaving Debeb there with only a small covering garrison, while Alula's son-in-law Hayla Sellase was moved to Asmara in Alula's place with only a handful of soldiers. In November 1888, Debeb tried to oust Hayla Sellase from Asmara and, failing, crossed the Mereb without the emperor's permission and occupied Adwa, from where he offered his alliance to the British at Aden and to the Italians at Massawa. Wary of placing another outsider in command over his own Tigrayan nobility, Yohannes instead named his nephew, Ras Hayla Maryam Gugsa, commander-in-chief of the combined army.

At the Battle of Gallabat on 9-10 March 1889, Alula was wounded in four places but continued fighting; Ras Hayla Maryam was killed, and Yohannes himself was shot twice while advancing to rally his line, dying of his wounds the following morning. On his deathbed, Yohannes declared Ras Mangasha his son and successor and charged Alula with protecting him. The retreating Ethiopians were caught again by Mahdist forces at the Atbara River, and the Mahdist commander Az-Zaki Tamal falsely claimed to have sent the heads of both Yohannes and Alula to the Khalifa in Omdurman.

With Alula and most of his Tigrayan troops absent at Gallabat, Debeb Araya seized his chance. He marched on Mereb Melash in late January 1889 and, on 9 February, defeated and killed Dejazmatch Hayla Sellase, Alula's son-in-law and the officer left in charge of the province, at Addi Baro, entering Asmara that same day and setting up his headquarters in Alula's own house. Weakened by desertions and the famine gripping Tigray, Alula and Mangasha spent the spring of 1889 trying unsuccessfully to win back the province through diplomacy, including an attempt to turn Debeb's rival, Dejazmatch Kefle Iyasus, against the Italians.

Debeb was not the only rebel in the province. Kefle Iyasus, a son-in-law of Wolde Mikael Solomon and one of the Italians' chief clients among the Habab, had occupied Keren on Italy's behalf in late July 1888, and on 7 February 1889, two days before Debeb's attack, he took over the former Egyptian forts there with the connivance of the Massawa command; his raids on Hamasen had already forced Hayla Sellase to leave Asmara and fall back on Marguz in western Seraye. The two rebels soon turned on each other, and from mid-March Kefle Iyasus raided towards Asmara, occupying it for a time in April.

Yohannes's deputy in Tigray, Dejazmatch Tedla of Ayba, briefly occupied Asmara in March 1889, forcing Debeb back to Segeneiti, but returned to Adwa on hearing of the emperor's death without having restored Alula's authority beyond the Mereb. Debeb then made a sortie into Tigray to free notables of the Mereb Melash held at Amba Salama, among them Wolde Mikael's son Mesfin and Tesemma Yemam, but both went to the Italians at Massawa instead of joining him. Wolde Mikael himself declined both Debeb's invitation and an offer from Mangasha and Alula to send him to subdue Hamasen on their behalf, choosing instead to submit to Mangasha. (Note: Italian intelligence reports cited by Erlich claim instead that it was Alula and Mangasha who released Wolde Mikael and Mesfin.)

At the end of May 1889, the Massawa command enlisted Debeb's help in disarming Kefle Iyasus, so that Italian-officered irregulars could occupy Keren on 2 June 1889; Kefle Iyasus was sent to prison, where he died. After helping the Italians at Keren, Debeb asked them to come to Asmara to forestall his Tigrayan rivals while he crossed the Mereb to take his father's lands in Enderta, but the Italians chose to stay out of the Tigrayan civil war. In July 1889, Debeb captured the Tigrayan capital of Adwa and reportedly declared himself king for three days before being tricked into visiting Mangasha's camp at Maqalle, where he was arrested by Alula. Yet with the rivalry inside Mereb Melash resolved in Alula's favor but the province itself left undefended, Italian general Antonio Baldissera easily occupied Asmara on the night of 2-3 August 1889, establishing his headquarters in what had been Alula's palace.

Baldissera, afraid that Debeb's disbanded men might join Alula, had countermanded the march on Asmara until peremptory telegrams from Crispi forced him to go ahead, and Hamasen traditions recall that the mere rumour of Alula's approach sent the expedition falling back on Ginda until one of its client commanders led it into Alula's deserted headquarters. In Caulk's words, "Hamasén went to Italy by default". Alula reached Akkele Guzai in the first week of August with too few men to drive the Italians out, and fell back on south-western Seraye, where he spent the rest of the rainy season raiding the Christian peasantry to feed his five hundred riflemen. The Italians arrested Mesfin Wolde Mikael, who died in prison, (Note: Hamasen tradition recorded by Kolmodin places Mesfin's arrest earlier, in June or July 1889.) and named Tesemma Yemam of the Tsazega faction chief of all their highland clients, only to strip him of his commands at the end of September. Men who had served with Alula, or whose fathers had died in his armies, flocked to the Italians, among them Blatta Gabru's son Abreha, and on 15 August Alula himself wrote to Massawa proposing an alliance between Mangasha and the Italians. Menelik's royal chronicle, correctly in Caulk's view, singled out Debeb as the man who had opened Asmara to the Italians.

=== Formation of Italian Eritrea ===
Tigray was by now completely exhausted from decades of uninterrupted wars. It could no longer challenge the Italians to the north or the Shewans to the south. The exhaustion was made worse by the great famine with which Menelik's reign began. A cattle plague, introduced by diseased livestock shipped to Massawa for the Italian expedition's commissariat in 1888, had killed off Tigray's herds by the middle of that year, and starving people in Tigray and the Mereb Melash migrated, many of them towards Massawa to enlist as soldiers with the Italians. Before the famine and epidemics of cholera and influenza eased at the end of 1892, many tens of thousands had died.

Menelik II was later recognized as the new emperor, thus cementing Shoan domination over Ethiopia. Menelik recognized the loss of part of Mereb Melash in the Treaty of Wuchale, signed on 2 May 1889. The Italian envoy Pietro Antonelli's draft boundary ran from Anfilla through Halay, Hebo, Akrur, Asmara and Tsazega and then along the Anseba, which would have given Italy Bogos and most of the districts once held by Egypt. Menelik compelled Antonelli to accept a general reference to the edge of the highlands as the boundary, and also substituted Arafali for Anfilla and Addi Nifas and Addi Yohannes for Tsazega on the Hamasen section. Rubenson counts these among the changes in Ethiopia's favor, and Asmara was among the places the treaty gave to Italy.

Menelik also refused to include in Italian territory the strategic valley of Gura, where Yohannes had defeated the Egyptians in 1876, or Tsazega, some twenty kilometers west of Asmara, so that the line ran precariously close to the edge of the escarpment on which Alula had built his capital. By a separate article (Article IV), he kept sovereignty over the monastery of Debre Bizen, which was to be an unarmed Ethiopian enclave. Because he did not know the Mereb Melash at first hand, Menelik consulted people from the region who were at his court. When the treaty was signed, neither Menelik nor the Italians controlled any of the northern highlands, and on paper Menelik kept for the empire the more prosperous and most densely settled parts of the Mereb Melash, from south of Asmara to the middle Mereb.

Proposed and agreed Ethiopian–Italian frontiers, 1889–1900

An Additional Convention of 1 October 1889 said that the boundary would be drawn according to actual possession. Menelik's cousin Makonnen, who signed it at Naples, had protested against departing from the line agreed at Wuchale and signed, as Antonelli admitted, only "with many reservations and some pique"; the Amharic text he was shown read "possession of this date", and the convention was re-signed at Rome on 20 October without changing that date. Caulk argues that Crispi chose the imprecise wording cynically, to give the Massawa command room to encroach on Ethiopian territory without alarming the Ethiopian embassy in Italy.

In 1890 (royal decree of 1 January 1890, n. 6592) Eritrea was officially declared an Italian colony, with its capital in Massawa. Its first governor was General Baldassarre Orero, replaced a few months later by General Antonio Gandolfi, a trusted friend of Francesco Crispi. The colony was named Eritrea (which came from the ancient Greek name of the Red Sea) by plenipotentiary minister Carlo Dossi, replacing the previous intended name of "New Ethiopia".

By the time Menelik's envoy Dejazmatch (later Ras) Makonnen and Antonelli returned with the ratified treaty, the new Italian governor, General Orero, was already at Debarwa and Italy's Eritrean allies were on the Mereb and beyond. Menelik argued that actual possession meant the situation at the signing in Rome, which would have given Italy land only as far as Shiket, about 20 kilometers south of Asmara. Antonelli agreed, but Crispi and the military in Eritrea refused, the talks broke down, and the Italians stayed on the Mereb.

Menelik later recalled that at Maqalle in March 1890 he had rejected Antonelli's claim to the Mereb but, overruling the objections of his northern subjects, had ceded Hamasen down to Shiket "so that the blood shed might be effaced". He assigned Seraye and Akkele Guzai to his deputy for Adwa and the lands beyond the Mereb and Belesa, Dejazmatch Mashasha Warqe, whom, according to Menelik's chronicle, the Italians ignored once Menelik left the north in April 1890. Antonelli claimed that the extra land lost through General Orero's disregard of the draft agreement on actual possession was deserted and of value only to bandits; in fact it included the most fertile farmland of Seraye, with a dense population of Tigrinya-speaking peasants who had been loyal to Yohannes. When the Italian resident Augusto Salimbeni pressed for the Mereb–Belesa line in July 1890, Menelik answered: "That territory belongs to me; no one else can give it away. I thought everything had been settled. First I sealed one treaty ceding such territory as you asked me; then, when I ... had already become emperor, you asked me and I gave all of Hamasén."

Rubenson calls the Italian occupation of most of Hamasen and Akkele Guzai and all of Seraye illegal; it left Menelik in a state of neither peace nor war with Italy, much as Yohannes had been with Egypt over Bogos. In his circular letter of 1891, Menelik drew the northern frontier so as to leave the Italians the territory ceded at Wuchale, the additional places he had offered in February 1890, and even those discussed at Addis Ababa a year later. In those talks at Addis Ababa in January 1891, Antonelli proposed a line running west from Addi Baro that would have left to Ethiopia Debarwa, the ancient residence of the Bahr Negash, and Menelik insisted on also keeping Gura and Digsa; he accepted a draft convention on this basis on 7 January, but Antonelli refused to sign any frontier agreement until the dispute over Article XVII was settled, and none was concluded. Before Adwa, Menelik was still prepared to compromise between the Wuchale line and the line along the Mereb, Belesa and Muna rivers that the Italians held.

In December 1894 the Italians' own governor of Akkele Guzai, Bahta Hagos, proclaimed the liberation of his province from foreign rule and was defeated and killed three days later. Rubenson thinks he acted prematurely and mainly because the Italians were taking land. Ras Mangasha then pursued the Italian commander Baratieri into Eritrea, and the two fought the indecisive battle of Coatit on 12 to 14 January 1895. Bahta, who had been set up by the Italians as ruler at Segeneiti towards the end of 1889, had used Italian rifles to take over from the semi-republican administration of Akkele Guzai and establish his own power. He had been in secret contact with Menelik since 1893, claiming the governorships of Akkele Guzai and Hamasen. Yet, in September 1894, Menelik sent Bahta's messenger back with instructions not to revolt, and the uprising was instead planned by Mangasha and Tedla of Ayba, later joined by Shum-Agame Tesfaye, without informing the emperor.

By the late 19th century, the old Bahr Negash capital had fallen into ruin; the British visitor James Theodore Bent found little left of Debarwa but a handful of stone piles, a half-ruined church, and a few poor dwellings.

== Customary law ==
The three highland provinces of Medri Bahri each had its own customary laws (heggi), compiled at different times and applied via their local assemblies of elders. Of greatest significance was the Heggi Hab Sellus Gara Kestos ("Code of Hab Sellus"), attributed to the time of Dejazmatch Hab Sellus (reigned 1663/64-1704) and compiled in consultation with the council of elders of Hamasen. The code established norms for land ownership, litigation, and government within the villages of Hamasen. There are still several copies of Heggi Hab Sellus in existence, and the code was used up to the Italian colonial era. There were also other regional codes, such as the Ser'at Karnessem for the Karnessem region of Hamasen. The province of Akkele Guzai used the Ser'at Adgena Tagalaba, whereas the Eggala lineage of northern Akkele Guzai and southern Hamasen used the Statute of May Adgi, which was formally amended in 1861 and again in 1902.

There was a unique process that was followed in the case of a court session under the Heggi Hab Sellus. There were three people who had to work together, an appointed judge (danna), a peasant, and a qes (priest). The danna was not allowed to have a copy of the law at home; the document had to come from an (often illiterate) peasant from the family of the law holders, and then the qes read the law aloud. All three were needed for the danna to judge. This arrangement, separating secular power, the church, and the peasantry, worked as a system of checks and balances so the law couldn't be manipulated by any single authority. Under the time of the Italian colonization, the code remained valid, and in 1918 it was officially published in Asmara for 18 pages, with signatures from local representatives of the villages of Sa'azzaga, Addi Musa, Qushat, Sa'da Krestiyan, Wekidebba, and Addi Asfeda, as well as from the qes of Addi Qonsi. Because of the recognition of customary laws by the government of Eritrea after independence, the civil law of the Heggi Hab Sellus was preserved and is used in courts in the villages of Hamasen.

The customary laws of the Seraye, known as the Ser'at Adkama Malga, had always been linked to the Adkama Malga lineage, which held sway over the region from the end of the 13th century up to the 18th century, when their influence and independence were greatly diminished due to wars with the Daqqi Tassem of Hamasen. There has been much academic research done on the code, especially as it relates to land ownership.

== Society ==
Debarwa's size and design reflected its role as both a stronghold and a trading center, as was shown by accounts from visitors of different eras. According to Alvares, more than fifty towns could be counted between Debarwa and Barra within the space of three or four leagues, and flat roofs, which are unusual anywhere else in the highlands, were the standard as far inland as Debarwa itself. Moreover, Debarwa was estimated to have 300 households, a majority of them women, and many wealthy men, though Christians, kept two or three wives. In turn, the French doctor Charles Poncet said Debarwa was two leagues round and was "the bureau and general magazine of the commodities of the Indies"; its houses were built of square stones with level roofs, with Christians living in the upper town and Muslims in the lower.

Even though the role of Bahr Negash was highly vulnerable and existed at the sole mercy of the Emperor, the office still carried ceremony and social standing. According to Alvares, four different people held the title within the six years of his stay in Ethiopia. It began with Dori, who died in office and was briefly succeeded by his son Bulla, before Lebna Dengel transferred the position to a nobleman, who was later promoted to Bitwaded and in turn replaced by another lord. These individuals were reportedly deposed for supposedly plotting against the monarch and were exiled to unknown locations. A loyal officeholder, however, could rise even further: Ros Nabyat received an elevation to qenné bitwaded (qäññ bəhtwäddäd) (Note: Favourite on the right/commander on the right.) in 1522 at the hands of Lebna Dengel, showcasing one way of attaining high government positions through this post. The office of the Bahr Negash also held significant judicial authority. A judge was stationed outside the Bahr Negash's house and handled ordinary cases, but only referred the more serious ones up to the Bahr Negash himself.

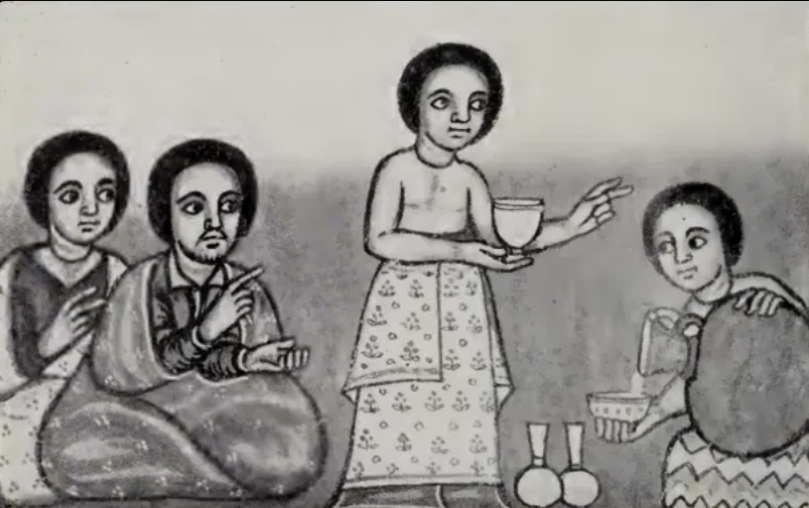
Drink being served, from an eighteenth-century Ethiopian manuscript

Status was also shown through different dresses and acts of homage. For example, the Bahr Negash was known for his elaborate dress, as was his subordinate Ras Aredam, who was described as richly dressed by early Portuguese visitors. When a royal messenger came to visit, the Bahr Negash was expected to rise and greet him. And when Empress Sabla Wangel fled through the region during the Ethiopian-Adal War, the Bahr Negash showed his submission to the crown by personally leading her mule, covered with a silk canopy.

Gender relations and religious customs in the area were distinct from general Ethiopian Christian practices in specific ways. In the 16th century, the Portuguese wrote about how married women in the Bahr Negash's territory covered themselves with black or colored woolen cloth with fringes, different from the lighter dress worn by women further south. The Bahr Negash's wife, meanwhile, was allowed to attend church with just one maid accompanying her, an exception to the more general restrictions placed on women. It is also important to note that Alvares observed how, in the area of the Bahr Negash, in contrast to farther south, nuns were not cloistered but lived in villages alongside laywomen, sharing monastery lands with the resident monks.

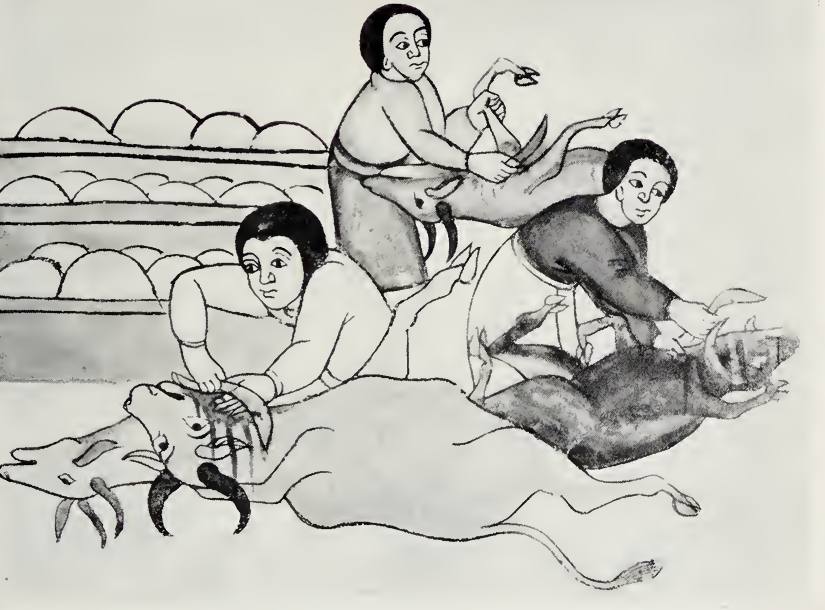
Slaughtering cattle, from an eighteenth-century Ethiopian manuscript

There was also a specific, distinct Lenten custom among the people of Tigray and Bahr Negash. They ate meat on Saturdays and Sundays during the fast, unlike the rest of the kingdom, killing, according to one account, "more cows than in all the year." In the north, and specifically in Hamasen, women would mix up with soldiers during battle, crying out "Sellase, Sellase" ("Trinity, Trinity") in a mournful tone that turned into a celebratory song if their side won.

== Religion ==
Debre Bizen monastery had an important economic and social standing in the region, though its privileges weren't always secure. Portuguese visitors in 1520 recorded twelve to fifteen orphan boys, aged ten to fourteen, being raised there by the monastery's priests for the love of God. And when Alvares visited the town of Caina in the Bahr Negash's country, five days' journey from Debre Bizen, he found it belonging to the monastery alongside about a hundred surrounding villages, each of which paid one horse every three years, amounting to thirty-three horses annually. The monastery's Alaqa (chief priest) explained that the Emperor had originally been owed the horses but had transferred the right to the church. However, the author of the Carta das Novas reported that Debre Bizen's monks complained that the Bahr Negash himself collected tithes from much of the surrounding country that rightfully belonged to the church. Reports on the number of monks, though, varied, ranging from about 300 to 500. Alvares himself believed the true figure did not exceed 200, with about a hundred permanently residing at the main site. The two churches at Debarwa were each said to have around twenty-two resident clergy. During his campaign to introduce Roman Catholicism in the early seventeenth century, Emperor Susenyos took a substantial part of the lands belonging to Debre Bizen monastery. The monastery did not regain this land even after the later restoration of the Orthodox faith.

The monastery's fortunes fluctuated sharply in the centuries that followed. In the last decades of the eighteenth century, after 1780–81 according to the Annals of Addi Nazammen, Debre Bizen suffered serious devastation. The Scottish traveler Henry Salt, visiting before 1810, found the monastery "deserted and in ruins." The French travelers Edmond Combes and Maurice Tamisier, who passed through in 1837, encountered a similar scene. The monastery was rebuilt from the mid-nineteenth century onward, eventually housing the greatest manuscript collection in Eritrea, amounting to around 572 pieces according to the resident monks.

From the 1840s, Mereb Melash became a site of competing Catholic and Protestant missionary activity. Catholic presence in Hamasen grew under the French Lazarists and later the Italian Capuchins, operating within the Apostolic Prefecture of Abyssinia, raised to a Vicariate in 1847. In Akkele Guzai, the French missionary Justin de Jacobis founded a Catholic community at Segeneiti under the patronage of Daggiyat Wube Haile Maryam, which became the core of a significant conversion movement from the 1860s onward, with several villages partially or entirely converting to Catholicism. Starting from the late 1860s, a religious reform movement known as the "Bible readers" emerged in Hamasen, establishing close ties with German and Swedish Protestant missionaries. An important number of priests close to the Hamasen leadership declared themselves Protestant, especially in Sa'azzaga. Emperor Yohannes IV responded with punishment raids against the affected villages; in the long term, however, Protestantism became permanently established in several communities.

This missionary presence also carried a political dimension. In 1865, the French consul in Massawa proposed to Napoleon III that Akkele Guzai be proclaimed a French protectorate. In 1868, the governor of Marab Mallash, Wolde Mikael of Hamasen, appears to have agreed to this proposal, and in 1869, the Catholic population of Akkele Guzai refused to pay taxes to Ethiopia because they were French subjects. The tax refusal is dated to March 1869, a time when some of Kassa's governors and potential rivals were also appealing to Napoleon III, with Munzinger's involvement. After Kassa defeated Wagshum Gobeze (Tekle Giyorgis) in July 1871, a letter from the head of the Catholic mission, Bishop Touvier, was found in Gobeze's camp, and Kassa ordered the missionaries out of Akkele Guzai and Bogos. Touvier and Munzinger then agreed that the Catholic population should ask Egypt for protection, and a representative of Akkele Guzai reportedly did so.

== Economy and military ==
Control of the trade routes linking the highlands to the coast was the main source of the Bahr Negash's wealth and political leverage, shaping everything from caravan traffic to the flow of firearms into the region.

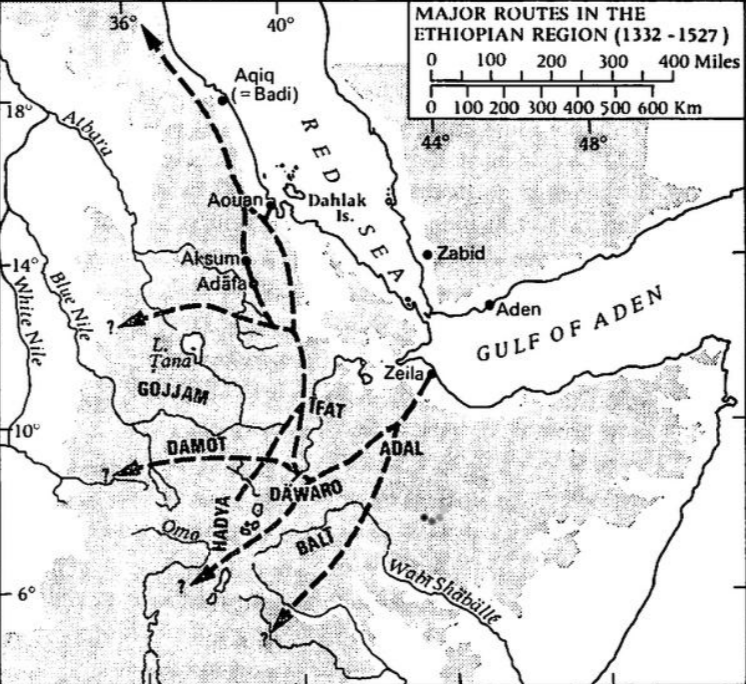
Major Routes in the Ethiopian Region

Caravans traveling between Debarwa and the port of Hergigo could have been very large and were sometimes attacked by the Doba people of the area. Alvares described the Massawa road as crowded twice a week by caravans of a thousand people or more. On one occasion he counted as many as two thousand people bound for the market at Hirgigo. Massawa's principal exports in this period were gold, slaves, and agricultural produce; grain from the Debarwa region, difficult to transport far inland, was instead carried to the coast for sale at Mecca, Zabid, Jeddah and Mount Sinai. Ivory later became a major export by the early nineteenth century, and in 1841 alone, twelve caravans carrying some 800 mules laden with tusks passed through Adwa going to Massawa, while two further caravans of twenty loads each travelled via Antalo and Saraye.

The same coastal access that carried trade goods also carried weapons. Local rulers of Tigray acquired firearms through secret purchase as well as gifts, despite multiple Ottoman efforts to restrict the arms trade at Massawa. Bruce identified Dixan, a town on the frontier of the Bahr Negash's territory, as Tigray's principal center for the slave trade. Christian residents though, brought children stolen elsewhere in Ethiopia to the town, where Muslim traders received them for sale at Massawa and shipped them to Arabia or India. The Naib of Hirgigo levied a tax of six patacas on every slave exported through the port, a trade that Bruce believed was tolerated by Ras Mikael Sehul because it financed his firearms imports. Contact with Ottoman forces at Debarwa left its mark beyond the arms trade itself. During the Ethiopian-Ottoman war, the Turkish garrison there kept a practice of firing a cannon and rifles whenever their commander returned to the fort. And after Sarsa Dengel defeated the garrison, they surrendered and honoured him with a fusillade identical to the one normally reserved for their own leader. He was so impressed by this salute that he may have been the first Ethiopian ruler to introduce gun-fusillades into the imperial coronation ceremony.

Massawa had its own currency system, separate from that of the interior. It used coins current on the opposite Arabian shore, a result of close commercial ties across the Red Sea. The Venetian sequin was the basic unit of account, subdivided into patacas, harf, diwani and kibeer. Broken glass beads called Borjooke served as small change. The gold sequin of Constantinople did not circulate at Massawa at all. It could only be sold to women, who used it as jewelry.

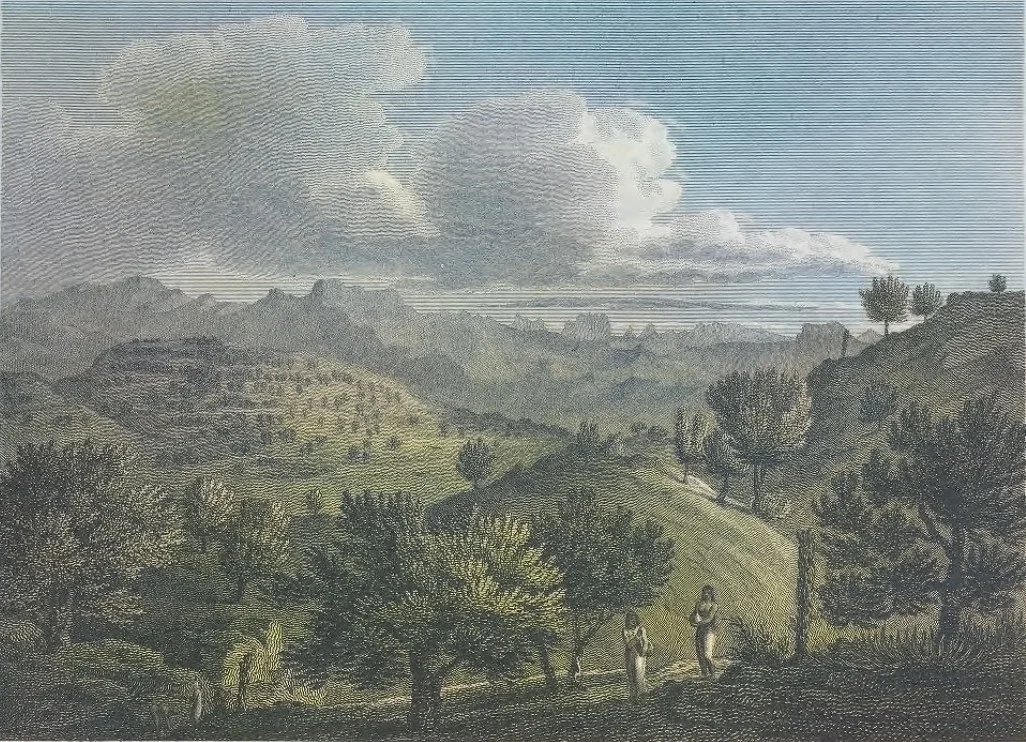
Villagers and the highlands near Digsa, one of the customs posts on the Massawa–Adwa route

Debarwa, the capital of Mereb Melash, had a weekly market every Tuesday and served as a commercial center for the region. As recorded by James Bruce, imports arriving via Massawa and Hergigo in the eighteenth century included wheat, durrah, honey, and butter, and by Bruce's time, traders who travelled the roughly 200 kilometer road between Massawa and Adwa had to pay customs at five different posts along the way: Samhar, Digsa, Darghat, Balez and Kella.

Hamasen and Saraye saw significant commercialization of agriculture by supplying wheat, durrah, and other cereals for sale to Red Sea shipping at Massawa and for export to Arabia. Pastoralist people north and east of Hamasen similarly produced butter that was shipped from Massawa to Jeddah. In a tax contribution contest between different chiefs, Dajazmach Nayzgi of Walqayt supplied a large quantity of cattle, but Dajazmach Mammo of Hamasen outdid him by contributing a substantial quantity of gold obtained from trade passing through his district on the route to the coast.

== Government and taxation ==
The Bahr Negash province had an administrative system of its own, separate from that of the empire. According to Ludolphus, the province consisted of seven prefectures. One of them, Hamasien, consisted of three cities, which, despite being under the sovereignty of the Emperor, had the liberty of choosing their own magistrates and having their own laws, sometimes providing asylum for outlaws from other regions of the empire. Centrally appointed judicial officials known as azzaž also operated alongside this local autonomy, serving as members of regional juries within the Bahr Negash's territory. This administrative arrangement varied from time to time. Bruce noted that Tigray was always defined as being surrounded on the northeast side by the Bahr Negash, which bordered the Mareb River; however, in the years leading up to Bruce's travels through Abyssinia, Tigray had expanded westward, annexing Enderta and Antalo and absorbing a large part of the Bahr Negash's former territory.

The duties of the province to the Crown were significant and have been recorded in considerable detail for the early seventeenth century, when two independent witnesses documented the breakdown of tributes from the territories of the Bahr Negash region, together with the remaining part of Tigray and its dependent regions. Pero Pais mentions that the tribute of the Bahr Negash was 5,000 cruzados per year, equal to the tribute of the governor of Tigray but higher than the tributes of the regions of Seraye and Tembien, which were 4,000 each. Barradas mentions a different amount of tribute as 200 oqueas for the same region and the highest one after the tribute of the governor of Tigray, 300. The total breakdown of the tributes by the districts as recorded by the two witnesses is as follows:

Tribute owed to the crown by northern districts, early 17th century
District	Tribute in cruzados (Pais)	Barradas equivalent (cruzados) (Note: The figures have been converted at the stated rate of 10 cruzados per oquea.)
Abargale	3,000	—
Agame	1,000	1,200
Aksum	—	400
Amba Sanayt	2,000	700
country of Bahr Negash	5,000	2,000
Bur (greater)	—	300
Enderta	300	1,400
Gralta	—	400
Land belonging to the Abuna	—	400
Sahart	1,000	1,300
Salicit	—	600
Senafe	—	300
Sera, belonging to the Queen	—	300
Seraye	4,000	1,500
Shire	—	2,000 (maximum)
Tembien	4,000	2,000
Tigray (the governor)	5,000 (or a little less)	3,000
Wajarat	—	1,400
Zama	300	400

Tribute could be paid not only in money but also in kind: Pais observes that the Bahr Negash provided forty horses of significantly superior quality to those contributed by Gojjam, while the chronicle of Sarsa Dengel similarly describes the region's tribute as large quantities of imported silks and cloth, porcelain, and fine horses.

In his own territory, the Bahr Negash had economic authority that extended beyond the simple act of sending tribute upwards. As Alvares explains, he controlled the trade in gold through the prohibition of the use of any weight for purchasing and selling gold other than those set by him, requiring the people of his territory to obtain the weights only from himself or from his agents in order to keep track of the quantity of gold being used in his territory. In addition, taxation in the region could be challenged openly. In Tsazzega and Hazzega oral tradition, for instance, it is said that the ruler Ras Walda Sellase called the chiefs of the region to the market center of Kodofalassi and asked each one of them how much taxes they owed following the previous taxation by Iyasu I. The people of Karnesem undervalued their taxes, but Kantiba Zar'ay corrected them publicly, forcing them to pay more and imposing this tax on their neighbors too.

The more recent tax records offer a better perspective on how the revenues have varied through time. According to Combes and Tamisier, by the 1830s, Hamasen and Saraye together offered the Tigrayan ruler Webe annual revenues of 30,000 dollars. The tax records during the rule of Emperor Tewodros II during the early 1860s reveal that the total revenue was about 240,000 Maria Theresa dollars, out of which 190,000 (about 80%) had been contributed by Tigray; out of this, 32,000 dollars had been collected from "beyond the Marab" river, i.e., Hamasen and Saraye.

== Bahr Negash ==
"Bahr Negash" became an official title in the middle of the fifteenth century under Emperor Zara Yaqob but it already existed in the twelfth century as "baher nagasi". The title was in use till the removal of Ras Alula Engeda in 1889. Notable holders of this title were Dori (who was visited by Francisco Álvares in the 1520s), Yeshaq (c. 1541–1578), Aquba Mikael (fl. 1589–1590), Hab Sellus (fl. 1663/64–1704), and Anda Haymanot (fl. 1729–1759). A complete list of known and attested holders is available at List of holders of the Bahr Negash title.

== Bibliography ==
- Ayenachew, Deresse (2020). "Territorial Expansion and Administrative Evolution under the "Solomonic" Dynasty". A Companion to Medieval Ethiopia and Eritrea. Brill. ISBN 978-90-04-41943-8.
- Bahru Zewde (2001). A History of Modern Ethiopia, 1855–1991. James Currey. ISBN 978-0-85255-786-0.
- Bausi, Alessandro (2010). "Saraye". In Siegbert Uhlig (ed.). Encyclopaedia Aethiopica: Volume 4: O–X. Harrassowitz Verlag. ISBN 978-3-447-06246-6.
- Bruce, James (1790). Travels to Discover the Source of the Nile, In the Years 1768, 1769, 1770, 1771, 1772 and 1773 (PDF).
- Bruce, James (1860). Bruce's Travels and Adventures in Abyssinia.
- Caulk, Richard (2002). "Between the Jaws of Hyenas": A Diplomatic History of Ethiopia (1876-1896). Wiesbaden: Harrassowitz Verlag. ISBN 978-3-447-04558-2.
- Chekroun, Amélie; Hirsch, Bertrand (2020). "The Muslim-Christian Wars and the Oromo Expansion". A Companion to Medieval Ethiopia and Eritrea. Brill. ISBN 978-90-04-41943-8.
- Chernetsov, Sevir (2005). "Gabra Maryam". Encyclopaedia Aethiopica: Volume 2: D-Ha. Harrassowitz Verlag. ISBN 978-3-447-05238-2.
- Chernetsov, Sevir (2005). "Hailu Tewolde Medhin". Encyclopaedia Aethiopica: Volume 2: D-Ha. Harrassowitz Verlag. ISBN 978-3-447-05238-2.
- Conti Rossini, Carlo (1907). Historia regis Sarsa Dengel (Malak Sagad). Corpus Scriptorum Christianorum Orientalium, Scriptores Aethiopici, Series Altera, Tomus III. Paris: Typographeo Reipublicae.
- Crummey, Donald (2010). "Wolde Selassie". Encyclopaedia Aethiopica: Volume 4: O-X. Harrassowitz Verlag. ISBN 978-3-447-06246-6.* Derat, Marie-Laure (2020). "Before the Solomonids: Crisis, Renaissance and the Emergence of the Zagwe Dynasty (Seventh–Thirteenth Centuries)". In Samantha Kelly (ed.). A Companion to Medieval Ethiopia and Eritrea. Brill. ISBN 978-90-04-41943-8.
- Erlich, Haggai (1973). A Political Biography of Ras Alula, 1875-1897 (PhD thesis). School of Oriental and African Studies, University of London.
- Erlich, Haggai (1974). "Alula, 'The Son of Qubi': A 'King's Man' in Ethiopia, 1875-1897". The Journal of African History. 15 (2): 261–274. doi:10.1017/S0021853700000876.
- Gabre-Sellassie, Zewde (1975). Yohannes IV of Ethiopia: A Political Biography. Clarendon Press. ISBN 978-0-19-821695-7.* Gebreyes, Solomon (2019). Chronicle of King Galawdewos (1540–1559). Peeters. ISBN 978-90-429-3665-2.
- Gebreyes Beyene, Solomon (2025). "Edition of the Chronicle of King Sarsa Dengel (r. 1563–1597): Textual Tradition and Stemma Codicum". Ethiopic Historiographical Texts: Textual Transmission, Edition, Translation, and Interpretation. Harrassowitz. ISBN 978-3-447-12464-5.
- Herman, Margaux (2020). "Towards a History of Women in Medieval Ethiopia". A Companion to Medieval Ethiopia and Eritrea. Brill. ISBN 978-90-04-41943-8.
- Kifleyesus, Abbebe (2005). "Daqqi Tassem". Encyclopaedia Aethiopica: Volume 2: D-Ha. Harrassowitz Verlag. ISBN 978-3-447-05238-2.
- Kleiner, Michael (2007). "Minas". Encyclopaedia Aethiopica: Volume 3: He-N. Harrassowitz Verlag. ISBN 978-3-447-05607-6.
- Lioce, F. (2014). Dalla colonia facile alla colonia Eritrea. Cultura e ideologia in Carlo Dossi. Napoli: Loffredo. ISBN 978-88-94003-73-4.
- Lusini, Gianfrancesco (2007). "Karnessem". Encyclopaedia Aethiopica: Volume 3: He-N. Harrassowitz Verlag. ISBN 978-3-447-05607-6.
- Miran, Jonathan; van Donzel, Emeri (2007). "Naib". Encyclopaedia Aethiopica: Volume 3: He-N. Harrassowitz Verlag. ISBN 978-3-447-05607-6.
- Nosnitsin, Denis (2003). "Bur". Encyclopaedia Aethiopica: Volume 1: A-C. Harrassowitz Verlag. ISBN 978-3-447-04746-3.
- Nosnitsin, Denis (2010). "Wube Haile Maryam". Encyclopaedia Aethiopica: Volume 4: O-X. Harrassowitz Verlag. ISBN 978-3-447-06246-6.
- Ofcansky, Thomas P.; Treiber, Magnus (2007). "Keren". Encyclopaedia Aethiopica: Volume 3: He-N. Harrassowitz Verlag. ISBN 978-3-447-05607-6.
- Oliver, Ronald (1975). The Cambridge History of Africa Volume 4. Cambridge University Press. ISBN 978-0-521-20413-2.
- Pankhurst, Richard (1961). An Introduction to the Economic History of Ethiopia. Lalibela House.
- Pankhurst, Richard (1978). Tax Records and Inventories of Emperor Tewodros of Ethiopia (1855–1868). London.
- Pankhurst, Richard (1982). History of Ethiopian Towns from the Middle Ages to the Early Nineteenth Century. Äthiopistische Forschungen. Wiesbaden: Franz Steiner Verlag.
- Pankhurst, Richard (1985). History of Ethiopian Towns from the Mid-Nineteenth Century to 1935. Stuttgart: Franz Steiner Verlag. ISBN 978-3-515-03204-9.
- Pankhurst, Richard (1990). A Social History of Ethiopia. Addis Ababa: Institute of Ethiopian Studies, Addis Ababa University. ISBN 978-1-85450-040-3.
- Pankhurst, Richard (1997). The Ethiopian Borderlands. Red Sea Press. ISBN 978-0-932415-19-6.
- Pankhurst, Richard (1998). The Ethiopians: A History. Oxford: Blackwell. ISBN 978-0-631-18468-3.
- Pankhurst, Richard (2005). "Dabarwa". Encyclopaedia Aethiopica: Volume 2: D-Ha. Harrassowitz Verlag. ISBN 978-3-447-05238-2.
- Rubenson, Sven (1976). The Survival of Ethiopian Independence. Lund Studies in International History. Vol. 7. London: Heinemann. ISBN 978-0-435-94240-3.
- Rubenson, Sven (2000). Internal Rivalries and Foreign Threats 1869–1879. Acta Aethiopica. Vol. 3. Addis Ababa: Addis Ababa University Press. ISBN 91-630-9210-7.
- Rubenson, Sven (2021). Colonial Powers and Ethiopian Frontiers 1880–1884. Acta Aethiopica. Vol. 4. Lund: Lund University Press. ISBN 978-91-984699-6-7.
- Sergew Hable Selassie (1972). Ancient and Medieval Ethiopian History to 1270. Addis Ababa: United Printers.
- Smidt, Wolbert (2003). "Akkala Guzay". Encyclopaedia Aethiopica: Volume 1: A-C. Harrassowitz Verlag. ISBN 978-3-447-04746-3.
- Smidt, Wolbert (2003). "Anda Haymanot". Encyclopaedia Aethiopica: Volume 1: A-C. Harrassowitz Verlag. ISBN 978-3-447-04746-3.
- Smidt, Wolbert (2003). "Bahér nägaš in the 18th to 20th centuries". Encyclopaedia Aethiopica: Volume 1: A-C. Harrassowitz Verlag. ISBN 978-3-447-04746-3.
- Smidt, Wolbert (2003). "Bambolo Mellash". Encyclopaedia Aethiopica: Volume 1: A-C. Harrassowitz Verlag. ISBN 978-3-447-04746-3.
- Smidt, Wolbert (2005). "Hamasen". Encyclopaedia Aethiopica: Volume 2: D-Ha. Harrassowitz Verlag. ISBN 978-3-447-05238-2.
- Smidt, Wolbert (2007). "Hab Sellus". Encyclopaedia Aethiopica: Volume 3: He-N. Harrassowitz Verlag. ISBN 978-3-447-05607-6.
- Tafla, Bairu (1977). A Chronicle of Emperor Yohannes IV (1872–89). Äthiopistische Forschungen. Vol. 1. Wiesbaden: Franz Steiner Verlag. ISBN 3-515-02304-6.
- Tafla, Bairu (2005). "Ellen". Encyclopaedia Aethiopica: Volume 2: D-Ha. Harrassowitz Verlag. ISBN 978-3-447-05238-2.* Talhami, Ghada Hashem (1979). Suakin and Massawa under Egyptian Rule, 1865–1885. Washington D.C. ISBN 978-0-8191-0828-9.
- Tamrat, Taddesse (1972). Church and State in Ethiopia 1270–1527. Oxford: Clarendon Press. ISBN 978-0-19-821671-1.
- Toubkis, Dimitri (2010). "Takla Giyorgis". Encyclopaedia Aethiopica: Volume 4: O-X. Harrassowitz Verlag. ISBN 978-3-447-06246-6.
- Tronvoll, Kjetil (1998). Mai Weini, a Highland Village in Eritrea: A Study of the People. Red Sea Press. ISBN 978-1-56902-059-3.
- Uhlig, Siegbert (2003). Encyclopaedia Aethiopica: Volume 1: A-C. Harrassowitz Verlag. ISBN 978-3-447-04746-3.
- Uhlig, Siegbert (2005). Encyclopaedia Aethiopica: Volume 2: D-Ha. Harrassowitz Verlag. ISBN 978-3-447-05238-2.
- Uhlig, Siegbert (2005). "Enticco". Encyclopaedia Aethiopica: Volume 2: D-Ha. Harrassowitz Verlag. ISBN 978-3-447-05238-2.
- Uhlig, Siegbert (2007). Encyclopaedia Aethiopica: Volume 3: He-N. Harrassowitz Verlag. ISBN 978-3-447-05607-6.
- Uhlig, Siegbert; Smidt, Wolbert (2007). Encyclopaedia Aethiopica: Volume 3: He-N. Harrassowitz Verlag. ISBN 978-3-447-05607-6.
- Uhlig, Siegbert (2010). Encyclopaedia Aethiopica: Volume 4: O–X. Harrassowitz Verlag. ISBN 978-3-447-06246-6.
- van Donzel, Emeri (2007). "Kadawerd". Encyclopaedia Aethiopica: Volume 3: He-N. Harrassowitz Verlag. ISBN 978-3-447-05607-6.
- Werner, Roland (2013). Das Christentum in Nubien: Geschichte und Gestalt einer afrikanischen Kirche (in German). Lit. ISBN 978-3-643-12196-7.
