= Zaul people =

Branch of Agew people in Eritrea

Zaul
ዛውል

Regions with significant populations
- Central, Southern

Languages
- Agaw; Tigre; Tigrinya

Religion
- Predominantly Christianity (Eritrean Orthodox Church, Catholicism, P'ent'ay) • Islam

Related ethnic groups
- Agaw · Amhara · Beja · Beta Israel · Bilen · Saho · Tigrinya · Tigre

The Zaul (ዛውል, Zɐʿwəl [zaʕwəl]) are an Agaw people and Tigrinya people who inhabit the southern and central regions of Eritrea, in a territory known as the Eritrean Highlands. They are spread across several villages and have largely assimilated to other ethnic groups within the country.

== Overview ==
Zauls were one of the Agaw subgroups that made up the ruling class during the Zagwe dynasty (ዛጔ, directly translating to "Dynasty of the Agaw"). After the Solomonic dynasty succeeded the Zagwe dynasty in 1270, the Agaw were recompensed with permanent settlement in the historic district of Wag. Some of the Agaws migrated north of Ethiopia to modern-day Eritrea. The Agaw subgroups that settled in Kebessa and Senhit are known as the Gebre TarKe, Adkeme Mliga, Liban and Zaul.

== Demographics ==
=== Religion ===
The majority of Zauls belong to the Eritrean Orthodox Tewahedo Church. Others practice Eastern Catholicism and an even smaller population practice Protestantism or Islam.

=== Languages ===
Most Zauls speak Tigrinya, Tigre, or Bilen. Other Agaw languages are spoken but used much less frequently.

== See also ==
- Agaw people
- Demographics of Eritrea
- Tigrinya people
