= Ileni Hagos =

Embet Ileni Hagos (c. 1805 – 1851) was the regent of the Duchy of Hamasien during the minority of her son between 1837 and 1841.

== Life ==
She was a high-born woman and an important leader of Tigray-Tigrinya descent during the Zemene Mesafint in present-day Mereb Melash, a region which at the time encompassed not only the Eritrean highlands but also some northern parts of modern-day Tigray.

At first, Ileni Hagos was given in marriage to Ayte Selomon, the eldest son of Kantiba Zar'ay, the ruler of Hazega. After the death of the latter in the mid-1820s, Selemon attacked Tse'azzega, but was swiftly defeated and fled to Gura'e. This prompted Ileni to step up and take a more important role in local politics. She then tried twice to avenge her husband's defeat, without success. Later, Ilen allied with the Irob-Tigrayan lord Shum Agame Sabagadis Woldu, who appointed her governor of Hamassien until his death in 1831 at the Battle of Debre Abbay. After Sabagadis' death, Ilen was able to maintain her status by allying with the new lord of Tigray Wube Haile Maryam.

In 1837, her husband died and Ilen became her son's (the future Woldemichael Solomon) regent. Many among her tribe who did not wish to see a woman in power, and her rule was marked by high taxation and various wars waged against local rulers which led to a loss of popularity and eventually to her deposition in 1841. After her demise, she retires to St. Mary's Church in Hazega to become a nun while still playing an important role in local affairs. When one of her old enemies, Kantiba Woldegaber, whom she has defeated in battle, visits her, they have a dispute over her late husband's property. Woldegaber is murdered and Ilen is accused of the crime. Due to that accusation, she was unable to find a safe place and tried to take refuge in exile in a neighboring region, until she was eventually extradited and killed in 1851.

Her sons later avenged her death, sparking a blood feud that ended only when her daughter married the nephew of her main adversary.
