= Eritrean literature =

Eritrean literature in the Tigrinya language dates, as far as is known, from the late 19th century but Ge'ez writings have been found in the 4th century BC. It was initially encouraged by European missionaries, but suffered from the general repression of Eritrean culture under Fascist rule in the 1920s and 30s. The earliest published works were primarily translations or collections of traditional poems, fables and folktales, but the renaissance of Eritrean culture promoted by the British administrators after 1942 included the appearance of the first novels in Tigrinya.

== Origins ==
Between the fourth and eleventh centuries AD, the Ge'ez language was the main language of the Axumite empire, and for some time thereafter it remained the language of literature. This literature, shared between Eritrea and Ethiopia, consisted mainly of historical tales about royalty and noblemen; ecclesiastical works, often in translation; and religious poetry. Ge'ez passed down to modern Tigrinya the Ge'ez alphabet and a substantial vocabulary.

The continued dominance of Ge'ez as a literary language after it was supplanted by Tigrinya as a demotic tongue means that very little is known of 'low' literature prior to the arrival of European missionaries in the 19th century. The first work published in Tigrinya was a translation of the Gospels, written in the 1830s and published in 1866. European missionaries were responsible for a stream of publications from the 1890s onwards, including the first Tigrinya language newspaper in 1909.

== First publications ==
The first literary text in Tigrinya was published in Europe itself: in 1895 Feseha Giyorgis, an Ethiopian, published a pamphlet in Rome giving an account of his journey to Italy five years earlier. Giyorgis was a scholar who taught Tigrinya in Naples, as well as studying the Italian and Latin languages. He was very conscious of his trailblazing role as "the father of Tigrinya literature": in his foreword to the work, he wrote that, "our main drive has been... to furnish those who yearn to learn Tigrinya with material for exercise". The content of the pamphlet indicates that his primary audience, however, was the educated elite of his home country, as it focuses on the author's impressions of the exotic country to which he had travelled. Negash praises the artistic quality of the work, arguing that it is, "endowed with special linguistic mastery and artistic, literary craftsmanship".

In the early years of the 20th century, several further works appeared: the first of these was a collection of forty fables and folktales by Ghebre-Medhin Dighnei. This was published in a journal in Rome in 1902. It contains nine fables with animal characters, typically depicting the stronger animals as unjust and untrustworthy, while the weaker animals are virtuous but powerless. The other 31 stories are folktales, including (number 34) "The Boy Who Cried Wolf".

Other publications of this period included three collections of oral poetry by Carlo Conti Rossini, Johannes Kolmodin and Jacques Faïtlovitch. Conti Rossini published his Tigrinya Popular Songs between 1903 and 1906: this ran to 166 works, with notes and commentary in Italian. It is divided into three parts. Part one contains 73 love poems, mostly by men, while part two consists of lovers' complaints. Part three, called 'Songs of Various Arguments' includes more substantial works, notably: masse poems, written for special occasions and combining entertainment, education and praise for tribal leaders; melke, written for funerals and praising the deceased; and dog'a, poems of general mourning. Two of the masse are accounts of the late-19th-century conflict between two chiefs, Ras Weldamichael of Hazzega and Deggiat Hailu of Tsazzega, an event which has continued to be the subject of folk narratives down to the present day. It is also a substantial presence in Kolmodin's collection, Traditions of Tsazzega and Hazzega, which forms a narrative of the history of Eritrea over the few centuries preceding the Italian colonization. Finally, Faïtlovitch's Habasha Poetry is a collection of 125 dog'a poems, assembled from the preceding work of Winqwist and Twolde-Medkhin of the Swedish mission.

One original work from this period was How the World Was Set Ablaze because of Two Serpents, a 270-line poem published anonymously in Rome in 1916. The work is a commentary on the First World War, which the author sees as a war between the true Christian countries of the Entente Powers and the 'champions of Islam', Austro-Hungary and Germany. In his preface, he explains that he wrote it because, "I want you to know in time about this terrible darkness which has deeply affected my conscience".

Before and after Eritrean independence, the drama form got a boost. Three playwrights, in particular, namely, Solomon Dirar, Esaias Tseggai and Mesgun Zerai, brought fresh ideas from England and rejuvenated the Eritrean stage with their emotionally charged one-act plays. Three Eritrean Plays, a landmark text in Eritrean stage history, collected plays from each of these playwrights: 'A Village Dream' by Mesgun Zerai, 'The Snare' by Solomon Dirar, and 'Aster' by Esaias Tseggai.

== Fascism ==
The remainder of the Italian colonial period, particularly after the rise of Fascism in Italy, was a lean time for Eritrean literature. Education became a matter of indoctrination, emphasising the superiority of Italian over native culture. The missionary education efforts which had helped to give birth to an Eritrean literary culture were discouraged by the colonial administration.

The only substantial fruit of this period was a further volume from Conti Rossini: his Tigrinya Traditional Proverbs and Songs was published in 1942, immediately after the end of Italian rule. This was again a work in three sections: the first, a collection of almost 500 proverbs, with Italian commentary; the second, accounts of Eritrean traditions and lineage; and the third a mix of 86 messe, melke and dog'a poems. The effect of the occupation is apparent in a number of poems praising the Italian rulers.

== Renaissance ==
The incoming British administration had a much more enlightened attitude to its subjects than its predecessor. Edward Ullendorff has said that, "The 30 years from about 1942 until the early 1970s witness the greatest flowering of Tňa writing hitherto encountered". One of the driving forces behind this blossoming was the Eritrean Weekly News. Supported by the British authorities, this publication went through 520 issues over ten years from 1942, with a circulation of around 5000 copies. It was edited by Ato Waldeab Waldemariam, another employee of the Swedish mission in Asmara, and published a wide range of fiction and non-fiction as well as news stories. The paper was also associated with the Tigrinya Language Council, a body established in 1944 to promote a modernised, correct form of the Tigrinya language.

Despite this literary renaissance, no Tigrinya books were published until the late 1940s. This has been attributed to a lack of funds and publishing know-how among the Tigrinya intelligentsia, and to the continuing control by Italians of the country's few printing presses. The breakthrough came in 1949, when Yacob Ghebreyesus published Legends, Stories and Proverbs of the Ancestors. Ghebreyesus was a Catholic priest and teacher, and published his collection of a hundred stories, 3300 proverbs, and various poems in order to provide reading material for his pupils.

The first Tigrinya language novel appeared in 1949-50, although it was originally written in 1927. A Story of a Conscript, by Ghebreyesus Hailu, tells the story in 61 pages of a group of Eritreans forced to fight for the Italians in Libya. The hero returns to his village after many travails, only to find that his mother has died in his absence. He composes a melkes poem mourning her death and condemning the rule of the Italians. Dr Harpreet Singh, an associate professor of English in EIT, Mai Nefhi translated The Conscript from English into Hindi and it was published on January 1, 2019.

Another novel, Dawn of Freedom, published by Teklai Zeweldi in 1954, has a similar theme, telling the story of several generations of one family opposed to Italian rule. It is written on a more sophisticated technical level than Hailu's work, often interweaving multiple narrative strands in a single chapter. A third work published around this time, Resurrection and Victory by Zegga-Iyesus Iyasu, is an "unambiguously moralistic and religiously didactic" allegory. Over the next 20 years, many further volumes appeared in the already-established traditions of didactic fictions, novels, anthologies and translations.

Diasporic Eritreans, such as those living in political exile, continue to publish works. In 2019 Yirgalem Fisseha Mebrahtu published 130 poems written prior to imprisonment and after her release from exile. They first appeared as ኣለኹ (I'm alive) written in Tigrinya; in 2022 the German translation was published.

Ribka Sibhatu is known for her contributions to intercultural literature and performance, including works such as Aulo.

== See also ==
- Culture of Eritrea
