= Embet Ilen =

Embet Ilen (c.1801 – 1851) was a high-born woman and political leader during the Zemene Mesafint in present-day Eritrea. The mother of Woldemichael Solomon, Embet Ilen was described as "without any doubt the most emancipated woman in Marab-Millash (highland Eritrea) in the nineteenth century."

Embet Ilen was given in marriage to Ayte Selomon, the eldest son of Kantiba Zar'ay, ruler of Hazzega. After acceding to office in the mid-1820s, Selemon attacked Tse'azzega. Swiftly defeated, he fled to Gura'e. After two unsuccessful attempts to avenge her husband's defeat, Ilen allied with Shum-Agame Subagadis, who appointed Ilen governor of Hamasen, but then himself died in 1831. Ilen kept her office by managing to ally with Wube Haile Maryam. In the late 1840s she gave up her regency to her son, Woldemichael Solomon. However, after being blamed for the murder of an old enemy, Kantiba Woldegaber, she was unable to find a safe place to live in exile.
