= North Eastern Asmara administration =

North Eastern Asmara
- Administration
- Country: Eritrea
- Region: Maekel
- Time zone: UTC+3 (GMT +3)

North Eastern Asmara administration is an administration of Asmara, Eritrea.
