= Eritrean =

Eritrean may refer to:

- Something of, from, or related to the country of Eritrea
- A person from Eritrea, or of Eritrean descent. For information about the Eritrean people, see Demographics of Eritrea and Culture of Eritrea. For specific persons, see List of Eritreans.
- Languages of Eritrea, several, but none called "Eritrean"
- Eritrean cuisine, a fusion of Eritrea's native culinary traditions and social interchanges with other regions
- Eritrean coastal desert, ecoregion is a harsh sand and gravel strip along the southern part of the coast of Eritrea and the Red Sea coast of Djibouti
- Eritrean literature, works in Tigrinya language

== See also ==
- Eritrea (disambiguation)
