= South Western Asmara administration =

South Western Asmara
- Administration
- Country: Eritrea
- Region: Maekel
- Time zone: UTC+3 (GMT +3)

South Western Asmara administration is an administration in Asmara, Eritrea.
