= Berikh subregion =

Coordinates: 15.33210°N 38.76714°E

- Subregion
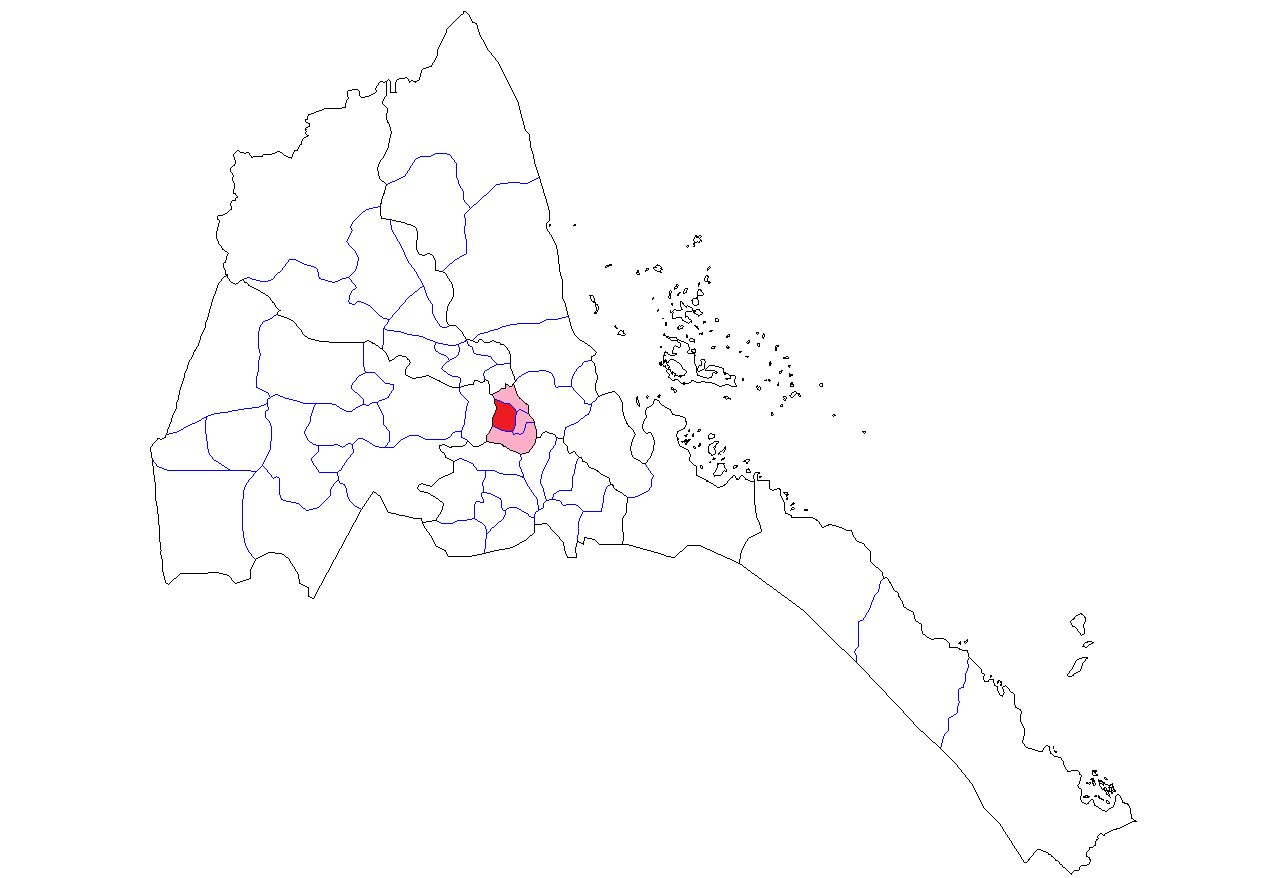
- Berikh district in Berikh Subregion
- Country: Eritrea
- Region: Maekel
- Capital: Berikh
- Time zone: UTC+3 (GMT +3)

Berikh subregion is a subregion in the central Maekel region of Eritrea. Includes Berikh district and the capital lies at Berikh.

== Villages ==
The villages of the Berikh Subregion are:

- Adena
- Adi Asfeda
- Adi Beney (Daero)
- Adi Bidel
- Adi Contzi
- Adi Gebru
- Adi Habtesulus
- Adi Merawi
- Adi Segdo
- Adi Shmagle
- Adi Teklai
- Adi Yakob
- Ametzi
- Berikh
- Hazega
- K'ushut
- Midri Zion
- Tsazega
- Tsaeda Emba
- Tsaeda Kristian
- Weki Duba
