= South Eastern Asmara administration =

South Eastern Asmara
- Administration
- Country: Eritrea
- Region: Maekel
- Time zone: UTC+3 (GMT +3)

South Eastern Asmara administration is an administration in Asmara, Eritrea.
