= Hamasien =

Historical province in Eritrea

Coordinates: 15°20′03.84″N 38°56′06.97″E

Hamasien (Tigrinya: ሓማሴን) was a historical province including and surrounding Asmara, part of modern Eritrea and historical Abyssinia. In 1996 the province was divided and distributed largely to the modern Maekel region, with smaller parts being distributed amongst the Debub, Northern Red Sea, Gash-Barka, and Anseba loops

Hamasien was located northwest of Akele Guzai and northeast of Seraye. Traditionally being the center of the Eritrean highlands, it is the locality of the city of Asmara (the capital of Eritrea).

== History ==
Archaeological evidence shows that Hamasien had been an area of a flourishing pre-historic society known as the Ona Culture that existed since around 800 B.C. with its population density being one of the highest in Sub Saharan Africa.

The earliest surviving appearance of the name "Hamasien" is believed to have been the region ḤMS²M, i.e. ḤMŠ, mentioned in a Sabaic inscription of the Aksumite king Ezana. The region may have been mentioned as early as Puntite times by Ancient Egyptian records as 'MSW (i.e. "Amasu"), a region of Punt.

Local folk etymology traces the name Hamasien to hamat Husayn (Tigrinya: "mother-in-law of Husayn"), suggesting the region's first settlers were led by a Muslim woman. This legend aligns with historical accounts indicating that after the fall of Aksum, particularly from the 10th century onward, parts of Hamasien were controlled by Beja and other Muslim tribes who may have been the first to exploit the region’s gold mines. During the final years of the Zagwe dynasty and the early Solomonic period, Agaw groups fleeing from Lasta settled in Hamasien, including the ancestors of the Bogos (Bilen) in the northern tip of Hamasien.

During the medieval era, the local Tigrinya groups of Hamasien maintained their autonomous leaders who were tributaries to the Ma'ikele Bahr ("middle of the coast"), the governor overseeing the region between the Ethiopian highlands and the Red Sea. By the 15th century, these governors were known as Bahr Negash ("king of the sea"), who controlled northern trade routes. Emperor Zara Yaqob placed two kantiba of Hamasien under the Bahr Negash, whose capital was Debarwa (now a part of Seraye). Occasionally, the Bahr Negash moved his seat to other key locations, such as Addi Baro in Hamasien.

In the mid-16th century, Hamasien faced threats from Ahmad ibn Ibrahim al-Ghazi (Ahmad Gragn), whose forces killed the local séyyum. After imam's fall, the Ottomans occupied the coast, and the Bahr Negus Yeshaq allied with them, placing Hamasien under Ottoman control from the 1560s to 1576. Emperor Sarsa Dengel later reclaimed the region, dividing power among several governors. By the 17th century, the Deki Teshim dynasty of Hamasien, which had developed very close ties to Emperor Fasilides in Gondar, was able to gain autonomy under Hab Sellus ruling from Tsazega. The customary laws of the Deki Teshim were unified into the Heggi Hab Sellus code. The dynasty's governors, descended from Hab Sellus, eventually split into competing branches: Enda Tsazega and Enda Hazega.

The 1870s brought devastation to Hamasien, with warfare and causing widespread depopulation. In October 1875, Khedivate of Egypt annexed the region, aiming to create a buffer zone against Emperor Yohannes IV. However, Egyptian forces were swiftly defeated at the Battle of Gundet, forcing their retreat. In the aftermath, Yohannes IV appointed Ras Woldemichael Solomon of Hazega as governor of Hamasien, including Bogos. Yet, Woldemichael soon submitted to Egyptian authority. In 1876, Yohannes reappointed Dejazmatch Hailu Teweldemedhin of Tsazega as governor with the title séyyumä hamasen, but he was killed by Egyptian-backed Woldemichael.

In 1878, Woldemichael defeated and killed another imperial governor, the Tigrayan Ras Baryau Gebretsadiq, during the Battle of Biet Mekae, near the present-day village of Haz Haz (meaning "catch catch," referring to the battle). Following this victory, Emperor Yohannes IV appointed Ras Alula as governor. Ras Alula established a new central government, first setting up his military camp in Asmara. Through regular military raids, he expanded imperial control over the Mereb Melash, solidifying authority from Hamasien to Bogos.

Following the death of Emperor Yohannes at the Battle of Gallabat, Hamasien was occupied by the Italians, who incorporated it into their colony of Eritrea and the former military camp of Alula, Asmara, the capital of the colony, a status it retains today as the capital of the sovereign country of Eritrea.

== See also ==
- Provinces of Eritrea
