= Berikh =

Berikh بريخ
- Country: Eritrea
- Region: Maekel
- District: Berikh
- Time zone: UTC+3 (EAT)

Berikh (Arabic: بريخ) is a town in Eritrea. It is located in the Maekel (Central) region and is the capital of Berikh District.
