= Kagnew =

Kagnew may refer to:

- Kagnew, a neighbourhood part of the district of Tiravolo in Asmara
- Kagnew Station, a United States Army installation in Asmara
- Kagnew Battalion, part of the 1st Division Imperial Bodyguard sent by Emperor Haile Selassie as part of the United Nations forces in the Korean War
