= Kidan Habesha =

Clothing style from Eritrea

Kidan habesha (alt. Zuria) is a clothing style from Eritrea, particularly among the Tigrinya ethnolinguistic group. For men, it comprises a white shirt and pants. A thin, gauze-like, fabric is then wrapped around the shoulders and chest. Men sometimes take the extra material and wrap it around their waist making a skirt on top of their pants, then wrap it around their shoulders. For men, it is a traditional dress, rarely seen except on ceremonial occasions (e.g., weddings, etc.).

== See also ==
- Zuria
