= List of national capitals serving as administrative divisions =

The table below lists capitals serving as administrative divisions by country.

== Countries where the capital is a first-level subdivision ==
Country	Capital city	Divisional unit		Typical term for first-level divisions	
Country	Capital city	Native term	Translation or equivalent	Native term	Translation or equivalent
Åland	Mariehamn	kommun kunta	municipality	kommun kunta	municipality
Algeria	Algiers	wilayah (ولاية)	province	wilayah (ولاية)	province
Andorra	Andorra la Vella	parròquia	parish	parròquia	parish
Anguilla	The Valley	district			
Argentina	Buenos Aires	ciudad autónoma	autonomous city	provincia	province
Armenia	Yerevan	N/A		marz (մարզ)	province
Austria	Vienna	bundesland	state	bundesland	state
Azerbaijan	Baku	şəhər	city	rayon	district
Bahamas	Nassau	N/A		district	
Bahrain	Manama	muḥāfaẓat al-ʿāṣimah (محافظة العاصمة)	capital governorate	muḥāfaẓah (محافظة)	governorate
Belarus	Minsk	horad (горад) gorod (город)	city	voblasć (вобласць) oblast (область)	region
Belgium	Brussels	région capitale hoofdstedelijk gewest	capital region	région gewest	region
Benin	Cotonou	département	department	département	department
Bermuda	Hamilton	city		parish	
Botswana	Gaborone	city		district	
Brazil	Brasília	distrito federal	federal district	estado	state
Bulgaria	Sofia	grad oblast (градска област)	city province	oblast (област)	province
Burma	Naypyidaw	pyi taung hcu naalmyay (ပြည်တောင်စုနယ်မြေ)	union territory	tinedaysakyee (တိုင်းဒေသကြီး)	region
Burundi	Bujumbura	mairie province	town hall province	province	
Cambodia	Phnom Penh	krong (ក្រុង)	city	khaet (ខេត្ត)	province
Cape Verde	Praia	concelho	municipality	concelho	municipality
Caribbean Netherlands	Kralendijk	openbaar lichaam	public body	openbaar lichaam	public body
Caribbean Netherlands	Oranjestad	openbaar lichaam	public body	openbaar lichaam	public body
Caribbean Netherlands	The Bottom	openbaar lichaam	public body	openbaar lichaam	public body
Cayman Islands	George Town	district			
Central African Republic	Bangui	commune autonome kôta-gbata	autonomous commune	préfecture kodoro kômanda-kôta	prefecture
Chad	N'Djamena	minṭaqah (منطقة) région	region	minṭaqah (منطقة) région	region
Chile	Santiago	región metropolitana	metropolitan region	región	region
China	Beijing	zhíxiáshì (直辖市)	direct-controlled municipality	shěng (省)	province
Colombia	Bogotá	distrito capital	capital district	departamento	department
Congo	Brazzaville	département	department	département	department
Croatia	Zagreb	grad	city	županija	county
Cuba	Havana	provincia	province	provincia	province
Czech Republic	Prague	hlavní město	capital city	kraj	region
DR Congo	Kinshasa	ville-province	city province	province	
Denmark	Copenhagen	region hovedstaden	capital region	region	
Djibouti	Djibouti	ville	city	région	region
Dominica	Roseau	parish		parish	
Dominican Republic	Santo Domingo	distrito nacional	national district	provincia	province
Egypt	Cairo	muḥāfaẓah (محافظة)	governorate	muḥāfaẓah (محافظة)	governorate
Equatorial Guinea	Oyala	ciudad administrativa	administrative city	provincia	province
Ethiopia	Addis Ababa	astedader (አስተዳደር)	administration	kilil (ክልል)	region
Faroe Islands	Tórshavn	kommunur	municipality	kommunur	municipality
Gambia	Banjul	city		region	
Georgia	Tbilisi	k'alak'i (ქალაქი)	city	mkhare (მხარე)	region
Germany	Berlin	Stadtstaat	city-state	Land	state
Ghana	Accra	region		region	
Greenland	Nuuk	kommune	municipality	kommune	municipality
Grenada	St. George's	parish		parish	
Guam	Hagåtña	village			
Guernsey	Saint Peter Port	parish		parish	
Guinea	Conakry	gouvernorat	governorate	région administrative	administrative region
Guinea-Bissau	Bissau	sector autónomo	autonomous sector	região	region
Hungary	Budapest	főváros	capital city	megye	county
Iceland	Reykjavík	Sveitarfélög	municipality	Sveitarfélög	municipality
India	New Delhi	rāṣṭrīya rājadhānī kṣetra (राष्ट्रीय राजधानी क्षेत्र)	national capital territory	rājya (राज्य)	state
Indonesia	Jakarta	daerah khusus ibu kota	special capital region	provinsi	province
Iraq	Baghdad	muḥāfaẓah (محافظة)	governorate	muḥāfaẓah (محافظة)	governorate
Ireland	Dublin	chathair	city	contae	county
Isle of Man	Douglas	balley	town	skeerey	parish
Ivory Coast	Yamoussoukro	district autonome	autonomous district	district	
Ivory Coast	Abidjan	district autonome	autonomous district	district	
Japan	Tokyo	to (都)	metropolis	ken (県)	prefecture
Jersey	Saint Helier	parish		parish	
Jersey	Saint Saviour	parish		parish	
Jordan	Amman	muḥāfaẓat al-ʿāṣimah (محافظة العاصمة)	capital governorate	muḥāfaẓah (محافظة)	governorate
Kazakhstan	Astana	qala (қала) gorod (город)	city	oblıs (облыс) oblast (область)	province
Kenya	Nairobi	kaunti	county	kaunti	county
Kosovo	Pristina	komunë opština (општина)	municipality	komunë opština (општина)	municipality
Kuwait	Kuwait City	muḥāfaẓat al-ʿāṣimah (محافظة العاصمة)	capital governorate	muḥāfaẓah (محافظة)	governorate
Kyrgyzstan	Bishkek	şaarı (шаары) gorod (город)	city	oblastı (областы) oblast (область)	region
Laos	Vientiane	nakhônlouang (ນະຄອນຫຼວງ)	capital city	khoeng (ແຂວງ)	province
Latvia	Riga	republikas pilsēta	republican city	pašvaldība	municipality
Lebanon	Beirut	muḥāfaẓah (محافظة)	governorate	muḥāfaẓah (محافظة)	governorate
Libya	Tripoli	šaʿbiyya (شعبية)	district	šaʿbiyya (شعبية)	district
Liechtenstein	Vaduz	gemeinde	municipality	gemeinde	municipality
Malaysia	Kuala Lumpur	wilayah persekutuan	federal territory	negeri	state
Malaysia	Putrajaya	wilayah persekutuan	federal territory	negeri	state
Maldives	Malé	šaharu (ޝަހަރު)	city	atholhu (އަތޮޅު)	atoll
Mali	Bamako	district		région	region
Malta	Valletta	lokalità	locality	lokalità	locality
Marshall Islands	Majuro	municipality		municipality	
Mauritius	Port Louis	district		district	
Mayotte	Mamoudzou	commune			
Mexico	Mexico City	ciudad	city	estado	state
Moldova	Chișinău	municipiu	municipality	raion	district
Mongolia	Ulaanbaatar	khot (хот)	municipality	aimag (аймаг)	province
Mozambique	Maputo	cidade	capital city	província	province
Niger	Niamey	communauté urbaine	capital district	région	region
Nigeria	Abuja	capital territory		state	
North Korea	Pyongyang	chikhalsi (직할시)	direct-administered city	to (도)	province
North Macedonia	Skopje	grad (град)	city	opština (општина)	municipality
Norway	Oslo	fylke	county	fylke	county
Pakistan	Islamabad	vafāqī dār-alhakūmat (وفاقی دارالحکومت)	capital territory	province	
Papua New Guinea	Port Moresby	capital district		province	
Paraguay	Asunción	distrito capital	capital district	departamento	department
Peru	Lima	provincia	province	región	region
Philippines	Manila	rehiyon	region	rehiyon	region
Romania	Bucharest	municipiu	municipality	județ	county
Russia	Moscow	federalny gorod (федеральный город)	federal city	subyekt federatsii (субъект федерации)	federal subject
Rwanda	Kigali	mairie	town council	intara	province
Serbia	Belgrade	grad	city	okrug	district
Solomon Islands	Honiara	capital district		province	
Somalia	Mogadishu	gobol	region	gobol	region
South Korea	Seoul	teukbyeolsi (특별시)	special city	to (도)	province
South Korea	Sejong	teukbyeol-jachisi (특별자치시)	special self-governing city	to (도)	province
Suriname	Paramaribo	district		district	
Syria	Damascus	muḥāfaẓah (محافظة)	governorate	muḥāfaẓah (محافظة)	governorate
Taiwan (Republic of China)	Taipei	zhíxiáshì (直轄市)	special municipality	shěng (省)	province
Tajikistan	Dushanbe	şahri mustaqil (шаҳри мустақил)	independent city	viloyat (вилоят)	region
Tanzania	Dar es Salaam	mkoa	region	mkoa	region
Thailand	Bangkok	maha nakhon (มหานคร)	special administrative area	changwat (จังหวัด)	province
Transnistria	Tiraspol	municipiu munitsipalitet (муниципалитет)	municipality	raion rayon (район)	district
Trinidad and Tobago	Port of Spain	municipality		region	
Turkmenistan	Aşgabat	şäher	independent city	welayat	region
Uganda	Kampala	town council		district	
Ukraine	Kyiv	misto (місто)	city	oblasti (області)	oblast
United Kingdom	London	region		county	
United Kingdom	Belfast	district		district	
United Kingdom	Edinburgh	council area		council area	
United Kingdom	Cardiff	dinas	city	prif ardal	principal area
United States	Washington, D.C.	federal district		state	
Uzbekistan	Tashkent	shahar	independent city	viloyat	region
Venezuela	Caracas	distrito capital	capital district	estado	state
Vietnam	Hanoi	thành phố trực thuộc trung ương	municipality	tỉnh	province
Yemen	Sana'a	amanah (أمانة)	municipality	muḥāfaẓah (محافظة)	governorate
Zimbabwe	Harare	city		province	

== Countries where the capital is a second-level subdivision ==
Country	Capital city	Divisional unit		Typical term for second-level divisions		First-level administration
Country	Capital city	Native term	Translation or equivalent	Native term	Translation or equivalent	First-level administration
Afghanistan	Kabul	wuləswāləi (ولسوالۍ) wuleswali (شهرستان)	district	wuləswāləi (ولسوالۍ) wuleswali (شهرستان)	district	Kabul Province
Albania	Tirana	bashki	municipality	bashki	municipality	Tirana County
Angola	Luanda	município	municipality	município	municipality	Luanda Province
Benin	Porto-Novo	commune				Ouémé Department
Bhutan	Thimphu	thromde (ཁྲོམ་སྡེ)	urban municipality	geok (རྒེད་འོག)	village block	Thimphu District
Cameroon	Yaoundé	département	department	département	department	Centre Region
Canada	Ottawa	single-tier municipality		county		Ontario
Costa Rica	San José	cantón	canton	cantón	canton	San José Province
Cyprus	Nicosia	dimos (δήμος)	municipality	koinótita (κοινότητα)	community	Nicosia District
Ecuador	Quito	distrito metropolitano	metropolitan district	cantón	canton	Pichincha Province
El Salvador	San Salvador	municipio	municipality	municipio	municipality	San Salvador Department
Equatorial Guinea	Malabo	municipio	municipality	municipio	municipality	Bioko Norte
Estonia	Tallinn	linn	town	vald	parish	Harju County
France	Paris	département	department	département	department	Île-de-France
French Guiana	Cayenne	commune				Arrondissement of Cayenne
French Polynesia	Papeete	commune				Windward Islands
Federated States of Micronesia	Palikir	municipality		municipality		Pohnpei State
Federated States of Micronesia	Kolonia	municipality		municipality		Pohnpei State
Gabon	Libreville	département	department	département	department	Estuaire Province
Germany	Bonn	kreisfreie städte	urban district	landkreis	rural district	North Rhine-Westphalia
Guatemala	Guatemala City	municipio	municipality	municipio	municipality	Guatemala Department
Guadeloupe	Basse-Terre	commune				Arrondissement of Basse-Terre
Guyana	Georgetown	municipality		neighbourhood democratic council		Demerara-Mahaica
Honduras	Tegucigalpa	distrito central	central district	municipio	municipality	Francisco Morazán Department
Italy	Rome	città metropolitana	metropolitan city	provincia	province	Lazio
Lesotho	Maseru	community council		community council		Maseru District
Liberia	Monrovia	district		district		Montserrado County
Lithuania	Vilnius	miesto savivaldybė	city municipality	rajono savivaldybė	district municipality	Vilnius County
Luxembourg	Luxembourg City	gemeng gemeinde	commune	gemeng gemeinde	commune	Luxembourg
Madagascar	Antananarivo	distrika	district	distrika	district	Analamanga
Martinique	Fort-de-France	commune				Arrondissement of Fort-de-France
Poland	Warsaw	miasto na prawach powiatu	city/town county	powiat	county	Masovian Voivodeship
Portugal	Lisbon	concelho	municipality	concelho	municipality	District of Lisbon
Spain	Madrid	municipio	municipality	provincia	province	Autonomous Community of Madrid
Sweden	Stockholm	kommun	municipality	län	county	Stockholm County

== Countries where the capital is a third-level subdivision ==
Country	Capital city	Divisional unit		Typical term for third-level divisions		Second-level administration	First-level administration
Country	Capital city	Native term	Translation or equivalent	Native term	Translation or equivalent	Second-level administration	First-level administration
Bolivia	Sucre	municipio	municipality	municipio	municipality	Oropeza Province	Chuquisaca Department
Bolivia	La Paz	municipio	municipality	municipio	municipality	Pedro Domingo Murillo Province	La Paz Department
Burkina Faso	Ouagadougou	département	department	département	department	Kadiogo Province	Centre Region
Chile	Valparaíso	comuna	commune	comuna	commune	Valparaíso Province	Valparaíso Region
Finland	Helsinki	kaupunki	municipality	kunta	municipality	Helsinki sub-region	Uusimaa Region
Greece	Athens	dímoi (δήμοι)	municipality	dímoi (δήμοι)	municipality	Central Athens Regional unit	Attica Region
Haiti	Port-au-Prince	komin	commune	komin	commune	Port-au-Prince Arrondissement	Ouest
Israel	Jerusalem	iriya (עיריה)	city	mo'atza mekomit (מועצה מקומית)	local council area	none	Jerusalem District
Israel	Tel Aviv	iriya (עיריה)	city	mo'atza mekomit (מועצה מקומית)	local council area	none	Tel Aviv District
Nepal	Kathmandu	mahānagarpālikā	metropolitan city	nagarpālikā	municipality	Kathmandu District	Bagmati Province
Saudi Arabia	Riyadh	Amanah	municipality	Amanah	municipality	Riyadh Governorate	Riyadh Province

== Countries where the capital is a conglomeration of subdivisions ==
Country	Capital city	Level of divisional units	Term for divisional units		Number of divisional units	List of divisional units	Second-level administration	First-level administration
Country	Capital city	Level of divisional units	Native term	Translation or equivalent	Number of divisional units	List of divisional units	Second-level administration	First-level administration
Bangladesh	Dhaka	3rd	siṭi karpōrēśana (সিটি কর্পোরেশন)	city corporation	2	Dhaka North City Corporation, Dhaka South City Corporation	Dhaka District	Dhaka Division
Bosnia and Herzegovina	Sarajevo	3rd	opština općina (опћина)	municipality	4	Centar, Novi Grad, Novo Sarajevo, Stari Grad	Sarajevo Canton	Federation of Bosnia and Herzegovina
Brunei	Bandar Seri Begawan	2nd	mukim	ward	9	Kianggeh, Berakas A, Berakas B, Gadong A, Gadong B, Kilanas, Kota Batu, Lumapas, Sengkurong	none	Brunei-Muara District
Burma	Yangon	3rd	myahoetnaal (မြို့နယ်)	township	33	Ahlon, Bahan, Dagon, Kyauktada, Kyimyindaing, Lanmadaw, Latha, Pabedan, Sanchaung, Seikkan, Botataung, Dagon Seikkan, East Dagon, North Dagon, North Okkalapa, Pazundaung, South Dagon, South Okkalapa, Thingangyun, Mingala Taungnyunt, Dala, Dawbon, Seikkyi Kanaungto, Tamwe, Thaketa, Yankin, Insein, Hlaing, Hlaingthaya, Kamayut, Mayangon, Mingaladon, Shwepyitha	West Yangon District	Yangon Region
Eritrea	Asmara	2nd	ni’usi zoba (ንኡስ ዞባ) dun al'iiqlimia (دون الإقليمية)	subregion	4	North Eastern, North Western, South Eastern, South Western	none	Central region
Jamaica	Kingston	1st	parish		2	Kingston, Saint Andrew	none	
Mauritania	Nouakchott	1st	wilayah (ولاية)	region	3	Nouakchott-Nord, Nouakchott-Ouest, Nouakchott-Sud	none	
Turkey	Ankara	2nd	ilçe	district	25	Akyurt, Altındağ, Ayaş, Balâ, Beypazarı, Çamlıdere, Çankaya, Çubuk, Elmadağ, Etimesgut, Evren, Gölbaşı, Güdül, Haymana, Kahramankazan, Kalecik, Keçiören, Kızılcahamam, Mamak, Nallıhan, Polatlı, Pursaklar, Sincan, Şereflikoçhisar, Yenimahalle	none	Ankara Province

== Countries where the capital is not a subdivision ==
Country	Capital city	Third-level administration	Second-level administration	First-level administration
American Samoa	Pago Pago	none	Maoputasi County	Eastern District
Australia	Canberra	none		Australian Capital Territory
Belize	Belmopan	none		Cayo District
Belize	Belize City	none		Belize District
Comoros	Moroni	none		Grande Comore
Fiji	Suva	none	Rewa Province	Central Division
Iran	Tehran	Central District	Tehran County	Tehran Province
Malawi	Lilongwe	none		Lilongwe District

== Countries that have no subdivision ==
Country	Capital city
Akrotiri and Dhekelia	Episkopi Cantonment
Aruba	Oranjestad
British Virgin Islands	Road Town
Christmas Island	Flying Fish Cove
Cocos (Keeling) Islands	West Island
Cook Islands	Avarua
Curaçao	Willemstad
Falkland Islands	Stanley
Kiribati	Tarawa

== Countries usually considered city-states ==
Country
Gibraltar
Hong Kong
Macau
Monaco
Singapore
Vatican City

== Countries de facto unoccupied ==
Country
Antarctica
Bouvet Island
British Indian Ocean Territory
French Southern and Antarctic Lands
Heard Island and McDonald Islands

== See also ==
- Category:Capital cities for other lists of capitals
- List of autonomous areas by country
- Table of administrative country subdivisions by country
- Capital districts and territories
