= Zuria =

African clothing piece

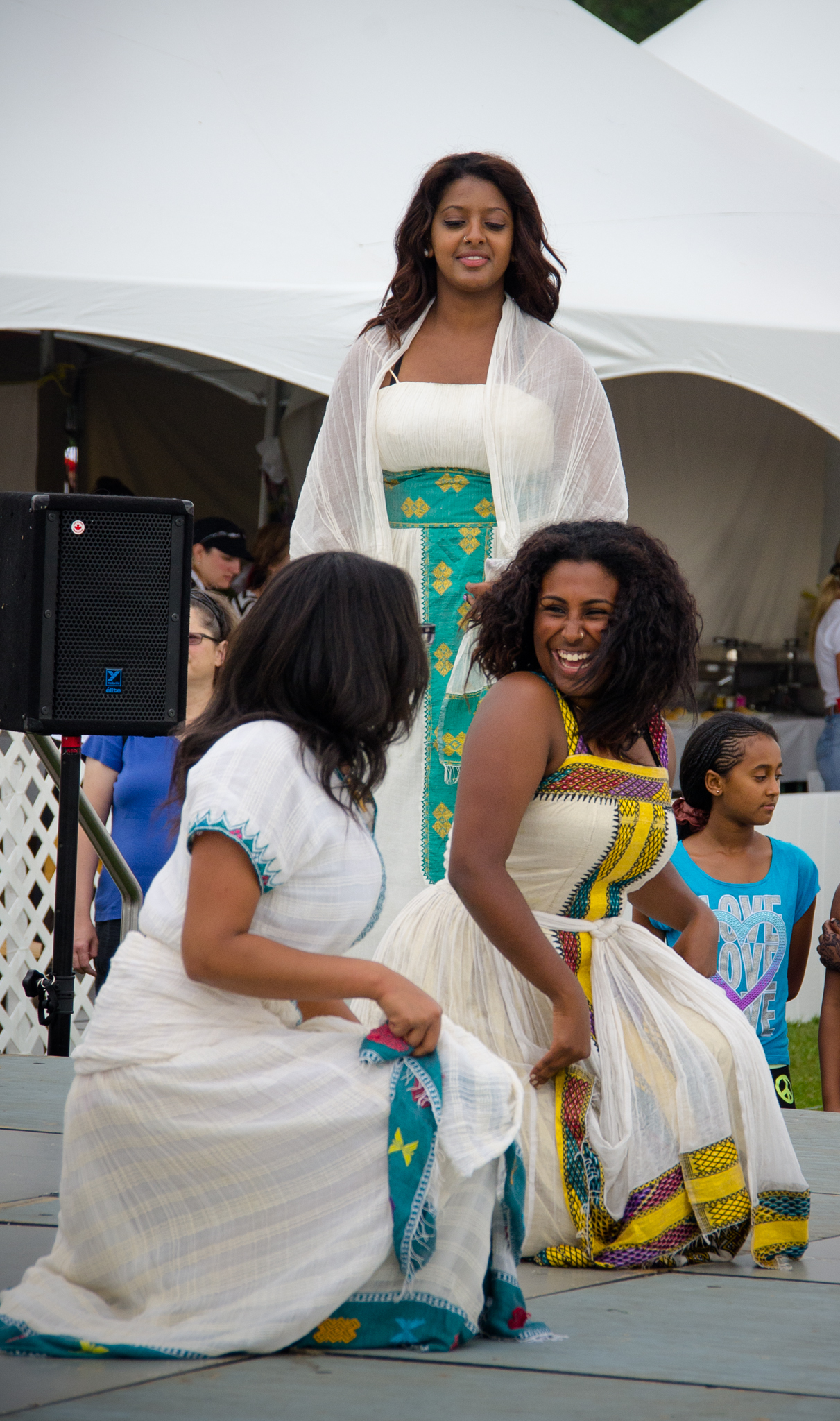
Eritrean women dancing in traditional zurias

A zuria is a dress worn by the Tigrinya women in Eritrea and the Amhara in Ethiopia. Traditional zurias often feature intricate designs, are ankle-length, and accessorized with a netsela, a white, scarflike accessory worn about the shoulders and head. Zurias come in different forms and designs with an extra sheen due to the demands of fashion. Zurias are worn during holidays, weddings, or parties.

The dresses labeled as Zuria are actually Habesha kemis. The standard Zuria is mass-produced, commercialized, and sold out of Addis Ababa globally including to Eritrean diasporas. It also makes its way to Eritrea through different channels. Local tailors in Eritrea use jadid fabric for every day, domestic traditional garments. It is the defining survival fabric of the local Asmara tailoring trade.

The terms Zuria and Jadid represent distinct components of traditional dress, material sourcing, and regional trade particularly among Tigrinya women in Eritrea and Ethiopia.

The Zuria designates a specific aesthetic configuration of the Habesha kemis known as the Zuria tilet. The zuria tilet design originated within the rural Amhara communities of the historic Shewa province in the central highlands of Ethiopia. The garment is defined by a continuous, horizontal band of handwoven or embroidered geometric patterns known as tilet or tibeb that completely encircles the bottom hem of the gown, paired with corresponding patterns along the cuffs and neckline.

During the 19th and 20th centuries, as Addis Ababa (located within the Shewa region) grew as a political and administrative capita, the Shewa Amhara Zuria tilet configuration became prominent in state diplomacy, early regional photography, and public functions. By the mid-20th century, this specific style was adopted as the standard, globally recognized silhouette of the Habesha kemis. High-end, celebratory zuria dresses are predominantly constructed from Menen fabric, a highly prized variant of traditional Shewa Amhara shemma cloth.

The supply chain for formal, heavily embroidered or weaved celebratory zurias made of Menen cloth relies on centralized manufacturing hubs in Ethiopia. Addis Ababa remains the primary international hub for mass-producing, handweaving, and finishing the Menen fabric and tilet panels necessary for the dress. Standard formal zurias are commercialized out of Addis Ababa and exported globally to diaspora boutiques or transported directly into Eeritrea through regional merchant networks to meet the demand for weddings, religious holidays, and forma events.

== See also ==
- Kidan Habesha
