= List of administrative divisions of South America =

The table below indicates the types and numbers of administrative divisions used by countries having territories in South America and their major dependent territories. It is ordered alphabetically by country name in English.

France's territory in South America is French Guiana. The Netherlands' territories in South America are Aruba, Bonaire and Curaçao. The United Kingdom's territories in South America are the Falklands Islands, and South Georgia and the South Sandwich Islands.

== Table ==
Country	Administrative divisions			
Country	First-level	Second-level	Third-level	Fourth-level and smaller
Argentina	23 provincias ^{p}	376 departamentos ^{d (m)}	municipalidad^{m}	localidades
Argentina	Buenos Aires Province ^{p}	135 partidos ^{d m}	localidades (districts)	cities and towns
Argentina	City of Buenos Aires^{c d m}		15 comunas	48 barrios
Brazil	27 unidades federativas :			
Brazil	26 estados	5,570 municípios ^{m}	10,751 distritos	645 subdistritos
Brazil	26 estados	1 distrito estadual		
Brazil	Distrito Federal^{c}	37 regiões administrativas		
Chile	16 regiones ^{r}	50+ provincias ^{p}	320+ comunas ^{m}	
Colombia	32 departamentos Bogotá^{c}	1100+ municipios^{m}	Comunas o Localidades; 2000+ corregimientos	Barrios; Veredas
Ecuador	24 provincias ^{p}	210+ cantones	1000+ parròquias	
France	27 régions, including: 5 régions d'outre-mer French Guiana; Guadeloupe; Martinique; Mayotte; Réunion; 1 sui generis collectivité territoriale ^{r}	101 départements ^{p}	342 arrondissements ^{d}	36781 communes ^{m}
France	1 [state private property under the direct authority of the French government]: Clipperton Island			
France	5 collectivités d'outre-mer			
France	French Polynesia	5 subdivisions administratives	40+ communes	
France	Saint-Barthélemy			
France	Saint-Martin			
France	Saint-Pierre and Miquelon	2 communes		
France	Wallis and Futuna	3 royaumes coutumiers	3 [districts] ^{d}	
France	1 collectivité sui generis			
France	New Caledonia	3 provinces	30+ communes	
France	1 territoire d'outre-mer			
France	French Southern and Antarctic Lands	4 [districts] ^{d}		
France	For French Southern and Antarctic Lands, see France above.			
Guyana	10 regions	27 neighborhood councils		
Netherlands, the Kingdom of	1 [country within the Kingdom that conducts its affairs]: Netherlands			
Netherlands, the Kingdom of	12 provincies ^{p}	443 gemeenten ^{m}	(27 deelgemeenten)	
Netherlands, the Kingdom of	3 bijzondere gemeenten Bonaire; Sint Eustatius; Saba			
Netherlands, the Kingdom of	3 [autonomous countries within the Kingdom]:			
Netherlands, the Kingdom of	Aruba	15 cities		
Netherlands, the Kingdom of	Curaçao			
Netherlands, the Kingdom of	Sint Maarten			
Paraguay	17 departamentos Asunción^{c}	230+ distritos ^{d}	compañías municipios	
Peru	25 regiones ^{r}	190+ provincias ^{p}	1800+ distritos ^{d}	84000+ centros poblados → 1800+ centros poblados menores (as government entity); 80000+ [centros poblados dispersos] (only as censal unity)
Suriname	10 districten ^{d}	60+ ressorten		
Trinidad and Tobago	9 regions Tobago (governed by Tobago House of Assembly); 3 boroughs 2 cities			
United Kingdom	(1 constituent country with no devolution): England			
United Kingdom	9 regions^{i}	81 counties (6 metropolitan and 75 non-metropolitan)	36 metropolitan boroughs 280+ non-metropolitan districts (Non-metropolitan districts include 46 unitary authorities)	parishes
United Kingdom	9 regions^{i}	Greater London^{c}	32 London boroughs City of London	
United Kingdom	(3 constituent countries with devolution):			
United Kingdom	(United Kingdom) Northern Ireland	(6 counties); 26 districts		
United Kingdom	Scotland	32 council areas		communities
United Kingdom	Wales	10 county boroughs 9 counties 3 cities		communities
United Kingdom	3 crown dependencies:			
United Kingdom	Guernsey	10 parishes 3 dependencies: Alderney, Herm and Sark		
United Kingdom	Jersey	12 parishes	vingtaines, cueillettes	
United Kingdom	Isle of Man	6 sheadings	17 parishes	
United Kingdom	12 overseas territories:			
United Kingdom	Anguilla	14 districts		
United Kingdom	Bermuda	9 parishes 2 municipalities		
United Kingdom	British Indian Ocean Territory			
United Kingdom	British Virgin Islands	5 districts		
United Kingdom	Cayman Islands	7 districts		
United Kingdom	Falkland Islands			
United Kingdom	Gibraltar			
United Kingdom	Montserrat	3 parishes		
United Kingdom	Pitcairn Islands			
United Kingdom	Saint Helena, Ascension and Tristan da Cunha	3 parts of the territory: Saint Helena; Ascension Island; Tristan da Cunha	Saint Helena has 8 districts	
United Kingdom	South Georgia and the South Sandwich Islands			
United Kingdom	Turks and Caicos Islands	6 districts		
United Kingdom	2 sovereign base areas: Akrotiri and Dhekelia			
Uruguay	19 departamentos ^{m}	89 municipios		
Venezuela	23 estados	municipios ^{m}	parròquias	
Venezuela	dependencias federales Caracas^{c}			

^{a} pseudo-municipalities (administration is appointed)
^{c} capital; see also Capitals serving as administrative divisions.
^{d} districts.
^{i} informals.
^{m} municipalities.
^{p} provinces.
^{r} regions.

Numbers of divisions
To simplify maintaining the table, numbers of divisions are only specified where a country has around thirty or fewer instances; for example, as of 2010, the twelve qarqe (counties) of Albania. For numbers greater than thirty, the number rounded down to the nearest ten (or, in the case of thousands, the nearest hundred) is given, suffixed by a plus sign "+"; for example, the "300+" komuna (communes) of Albania. More precise figures should be found in the articles linked by the table.

Terms in italics
Terms in italics are terms in languages other than English. They should be in plural form, followed by a footnote or footnotes indicating the generally accepted English equivalent or translation. Known alternative spellings are given in brackets following a term.

Terms in brackets
Entries in standard brackets either indicate that the term used is informal or that its use is yet to be confirmed. An English term in square brackets indicates that the local name for the term is not yet known or confirmed; when confirmed, it is replaced by the local name in italics.

Footnote letters ( ^{c} ^{d} ^{m} ^{p} ^{r} )
These indicate, respectively, five common types of administrative division in English: capitals; districts; municipalities; provinces; and regions. Other English terms appear among the numbered footnotes.

=== Administrative divisions with ISO 3166-1 ===
Administrative divisions with ISO 3166-1 are cited for statistics matters even when they do not have a special status (for example, the overseas regions of France).

=== Antarctic claims ===
Administrative divisions that are entirely Antarctic claims suspended under the Antarctic Treaty are not listed.

=== Autonomous areas ===
Not all the autonomous areas are part of the formal hierarchy of the administrative division system of a country (for example, the autonomous region of Zanzibar comprises 5 regions of Tanzania, the first tier on administrative divisions on that country). For more details, see List of autonomous areas by country.

=== Dependent territories ===
Dependent territories are listed with their sovereign country. For more details, see List of dependent territories.

== See also ==
- Country subdivision
- ISO 3166-2, codes for country subdivisions
- Associated state
- Asymmetric federation
- Condominium, joint sovereignty over an area shared by two or more states.
- Dependent territory
- Federacy
- Federation
- Federated state
- List of terms for country subdivisions
- List of capitals serving as administrative divisions by country
- List of autonomous areas by country
- List of sovereign states
- List of the most populous country subdivisions
- Lists of political and geographic subdivisions by total area, comparing continents, countries, and first-level administrative country subdivisions.
- List of political and geographic subdivisions by total area (all)
- List of FIPS region codes in FIPS 10-4, withdrawn from the Federal Information Processing Standard (FIPS) in 2008
- Nomenclature of Territorial Units for Statistics (NUTS), which covers the subdivisions of the members of the European Union
