= Senhit =

Senhit may refer to:

- Senhit, former province of Eritrea
- Senhit (singer), Italian singer who has represented San Marino in the Eurovision Song Contest
