= Ilen =

Ilen may refer to:

- River Ilen, County Cork, Ireland
- Ilen Rovers GAA, a Gaelic football club in County Cork, Ireland
- Ilen School and Network for Wooden Boat Building, a charity in Limerick, Ireland
- A. K. Ilen (Auxiliary Ketch Ilen), an Irish ship
- Embet Ilen (c. 1801–1851), Eritrean politician
- Ilen Church, a church in Trondheim, Norway
