= Eritrea (disambiguation) =

Eritrea is a country in the Horn of Africa.

Eritrea may also refer to:

- Eritrea (opera), by Francesco Cavalli
- Eritrea (colonial ship), Italian warship
- Eretria, the Greek city

== See also ==
- Eritrean (disambiguation)
