= Bilen people =

Ethnic group in Eritrea

Bilen
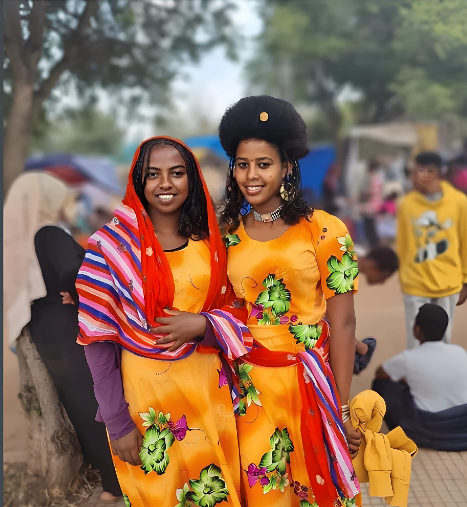
- Bilen women

Total population
- 121,000

Regions with significant populations
- Eritrea

Languages
- Bilen

Religion
- Majority Islam Minority Christianity (Roman Catholic Church)

Related ethnic groups
- Other Agaw peoples, especially Xamirs

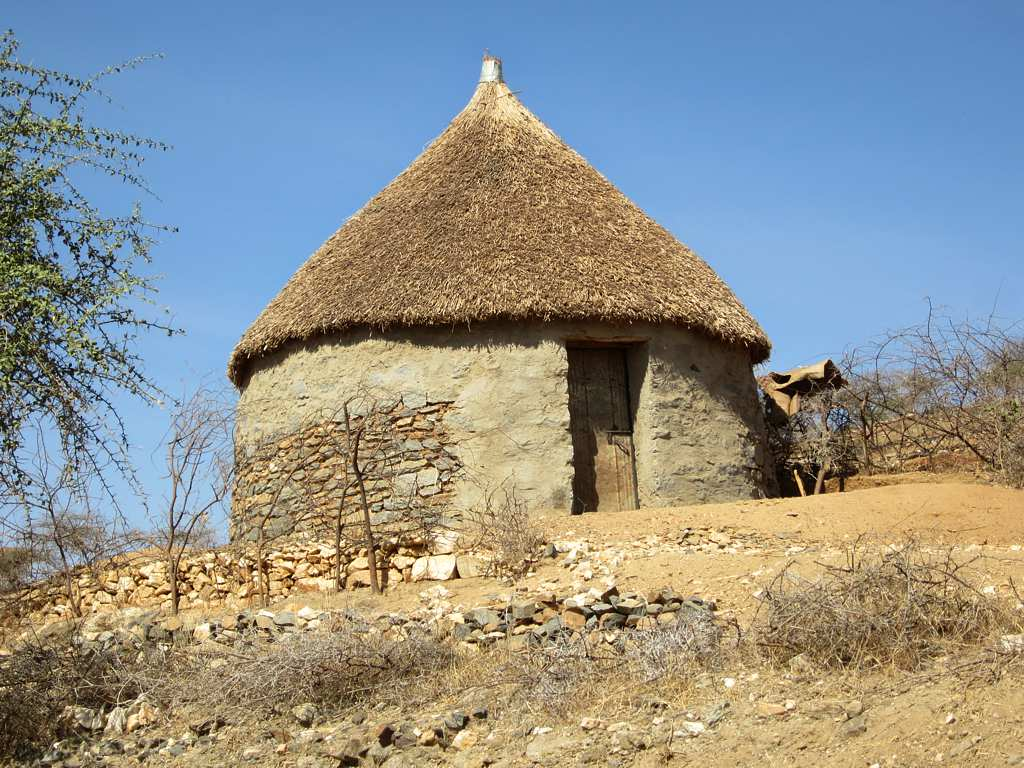
Bilen house

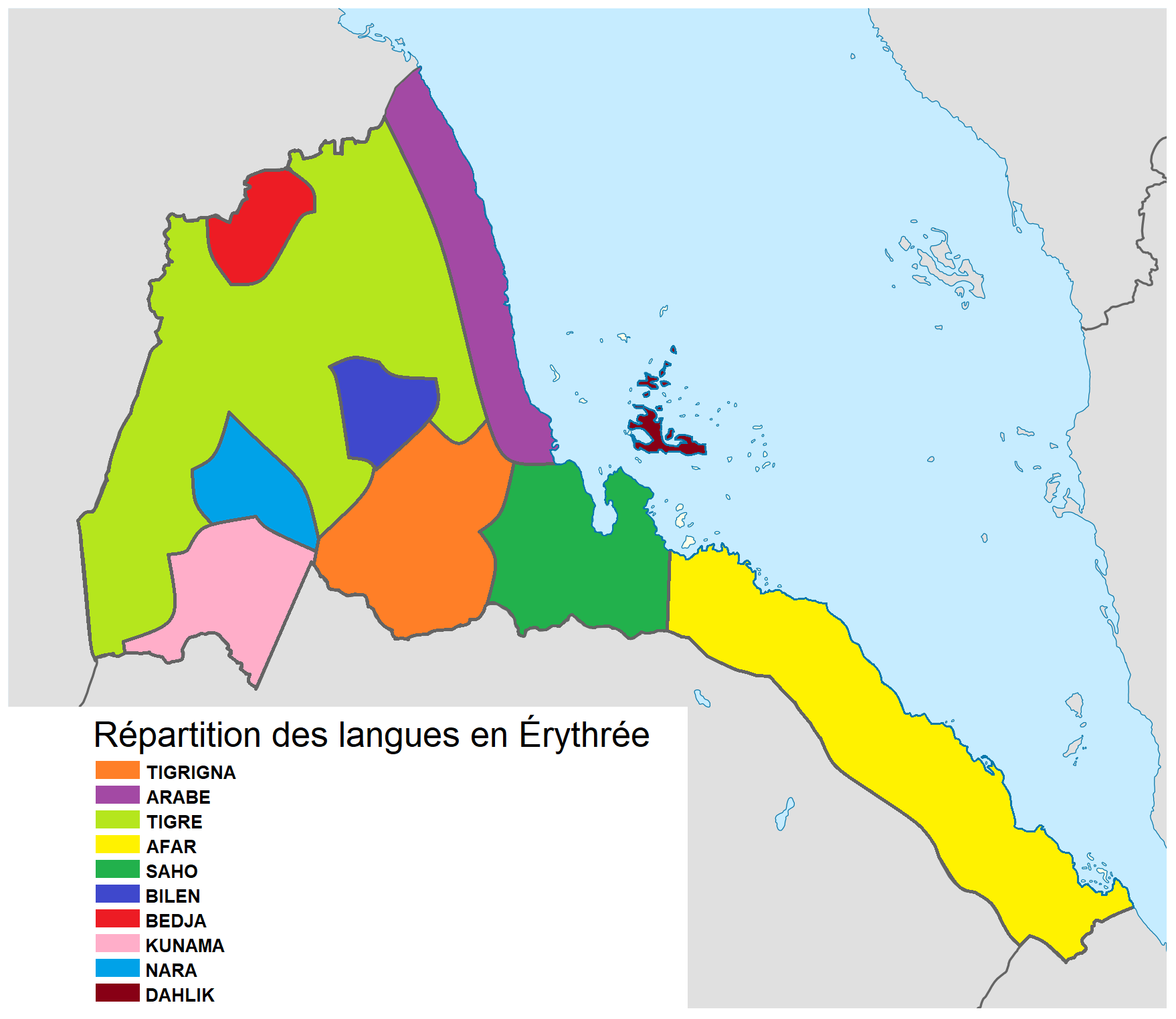
Ethnolinguistic map of Eritrea; the Bilen live in the dark blue region.

The Bilen (also variously transcribed as Blin, and also formerly known as the Bogos or Northern Agaw) are a Cushitic ethnic group in Eritrea. They are primarily concentrated in central Eritrea, in and around the city of Keren and further south toward Asmara, the nation's capital. They are split into two sub-tribes: Bet Tarqe and Bet Tawqe which are split into further clans known as Hissat. The Tawke has six whereas the Tarke has five which each are divided into smaller kinship groups.

== History ==
According to local oral tradition, the Bilen migrated to the Eritrean plateau from Lasta around the 9th or 10th century led by Gebre Tarqe. A second wave of migration may have occurred according to historians during the fall of the Zagwe dynasty in 1270. In the 14th century, other groups with different origins were also integrated into the Bilen, such as the Bet Tawqe from Hamasien.

=== Saint Ewostatewos's Period ===
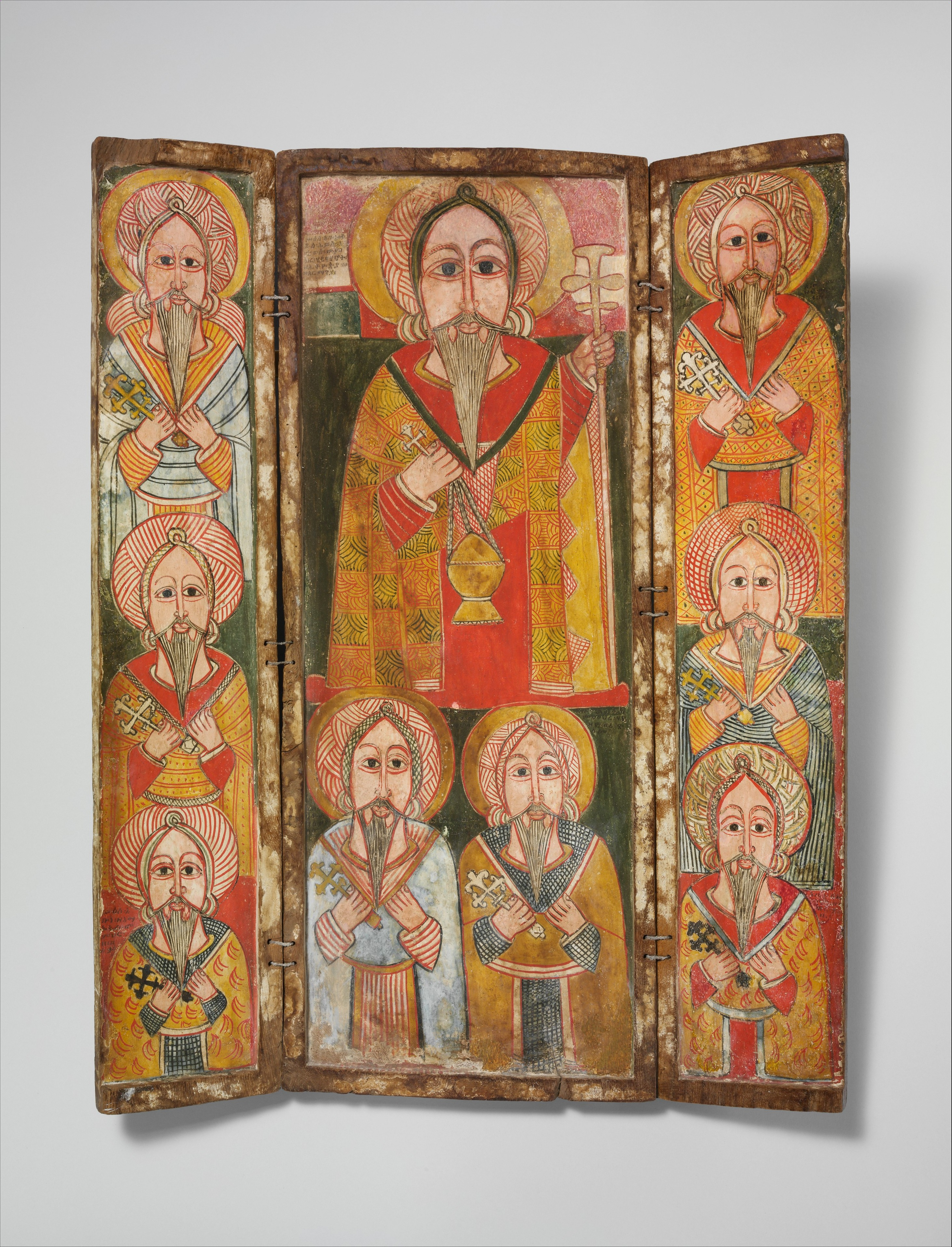
Ewostatewos preaching to his disciples

According to the Gadla Ewostatewos, after receiving a message from God, Saint Ewostatewos decided to travel to Jerusalem. Before departing, he instructed his sons not to perform the sacraments using a particular plate and golden chalice until they learned of his death and life. He then blessed his sons and urged them to keep his commandments so that they might meet again in the Kingdom of Heaven. His sons returned home in sorrow, while his son Absadi accompanied him on the journey. When Saint Ewostatewos and Absadi arrived in the land of Bagüǎs (Bogos), the inhabitants received them. Two local leaders, identified in the account as Merarā and Gansaya Egzi'e, rode out on horseback to welcome the saint. According to the narrative, their horses suddenly became immobile when they saw him from a distance. Neither horse could move forward, backward, or sideways. Witnessing this miracle, the people were astonished, while the two leaders became fearful. Saint Ewostatewos took pity on them and made the sign of the cross over them, after which the horses began moving again. The two leaders then dismounted, bowed before Saint Ewostatewos, and greeted him. When he asked their names, one identified himself as Merarā and the other as Gansaya Egzi'e. The saint responded that their names had been given to them by their mothers and, through the Holy Spirit, recognized Merarā as a chosen vessel of God. Local traditions suggest that they recognized the authority of some Ethiopian Emperors. The period of Funj domination over neighboring areas is also remembered as a time of stability for the Bilen.

At the end of the Zemene Mesafint, the Bilen were largely autonomous but accepted the suzerainty of the Christian governor of Hamasien. Many Bilen, however, later converted to Islam in response to Egyptian raids. During this period, Egyptian sources refer to the Bilen area as "Kustan" (from "kréstyan," meaning "Christian") and considered it a dependency of the Mudiriyah of Taka, conducting raids against them in 1850, 1854, 1862–63, and 1867. The Ethiopian warlord Dejazmach Wube Haile Maryam also led several devastating raids against the Bilen from 1844–1849. Facing increasing pressure in their borderland existence, the Bilen began seeking protection from external powers and changed their religious affiliations.

In the early 1850s, a Catholic mission led by Giovanni Stella was established in Keren. The permanent presence of the Catholic Lazarist mission had a lasting influence on the Bilen, and Keren became one of the few centers of the Apostolic Vicariate of Abyssinia. The French established a permanent consulate at the coast and declared the Bilen their protégés. In the 1860s, the Bilen territory became a de facto French protectorate. Traditional feuds with cattle-raiding groups from Barka (a term for the inhabitants of the Barka lowlands), who were Egyptian subjects, led to reparations paid by the Egyptian government to the French, who then redistributed them among the Bilen. Stella then established an Italian agricultural colony in the area (the "Colonia Italo-Africana di Sciotel", 1867–69); however, Stella died in 1869 after which the colony soon disintegrated.

In 1865–66, the Egyptians took over the Ottoman province of Massawa and also laid claim to Keren. Some Bilen elders reportedly sought Egyptian protection, which Werner Munzinger, the Egyptian governor of Massawa since 1871 (who was married to a Bilen woman), used as justification to occupy Keren on July 2, 1872. Over the following years, the new government effectively pacified the Bilen area (1872–75). In 1875, when war between Egypt and Ethiopia became imminent, Egyptian troops from Massawa were concentrated in the Bogos area. Amid power struggles in Hamasien, the rebellious Ras Woldemichael Solomon established himself among the Bilen (1876–79). However, with Egypt weakened by the war, Ras Alula, governor of the Mereb Melash, raided the Bilen and even attacked areas surrounding the Egyptian fort of Sanhit in Keren, forcibly collecting tribute.

Emperor Yohannes IV launched an active diplomatic campaign to convince European powers, including high-ranking Egyptian officials like General Charles George Gordon, that the Bilen territory should be ceded to Ethiopia. The Anglo-Egyptian Hewett Treaty of 1884 officially transferred the Bogos territory to Emperor Yohannes IV, and most of it was occupied by Ras Alula as his northernmost province. However, in 1888, the Italians, who had declared a protectorate over the Red Sea coast, annexed the Bilen area. In 1890, it was incorporated into the Zona di Cheren of the newly established Italian Eritrea.

The Italians maintained the traditional Bilen system of governance and ruled through the different clans. It was only in 1932 that they attempted to appoint leaders for both the Bet Tarqe and Bet Taqwe clans, but this move was met with strong opposition.

During the Eritrean War of Independence (1961–91), the Bilen remained staunchly loyal to the Eritrean Liberation Front (ELF), though they became underrepresented in the Eritrean People's Liberation Front (EPLF) and the later Eritrean government.

== Demography ==
According to a 2006 estimate, the total population of the Bilen was around 91,000. The Bilens comprise around two percent of the population of Eritrea. The vast majority of the Bilen live in Eritrea but some also live in Ethiopia and Djibouti.

== Religion ==
The Bilen practice both Islam and Christianity. A 2020 source indicated that two-thirds of the Bilen are Muslim while the rest are Christians. Other sources state Sunni Islam is followed by half of the Bilen, with the other half adhering to Christianity of various denominations. Muslim adherents mainly inhabit rural areas and have intermingled with the adjacent Tigre, while Christian Bilen tend to reside in urban areas and have intermingled with the Tigrinya People (Biher-Tigrinya). The religious diversity of the Bilen has aided the peaceful coexistence among them with little conflict arising due to religious differences.

== Economy ==
The traditional livelihood of most Bilen consisted of pastoralism. However, the recent migration of other groups into the area resulted in the Bilens taking up other occupations including farming. Most modern Bilen are animal herders and farmers.

== Language ==
The Bilen speak the Bilen language, which is classified under the Cushitic branch of the Afro-Asiatic language family. They also speak other Afro-Asiatic languages, such as Arabic, Tigre and Tigrinya. In addition to these languages, much of the younger and middle-aged Muslim Bilen have switched to Arabic or Tigre as their primary languages, while older generations continue to speak Bilen mixed with Arabic in everyday speech.
