= Bereket Mengisteab =

Eritrean musician (1938–2025)

Bereket Mengisteab በረኸት መንግስተኣብ
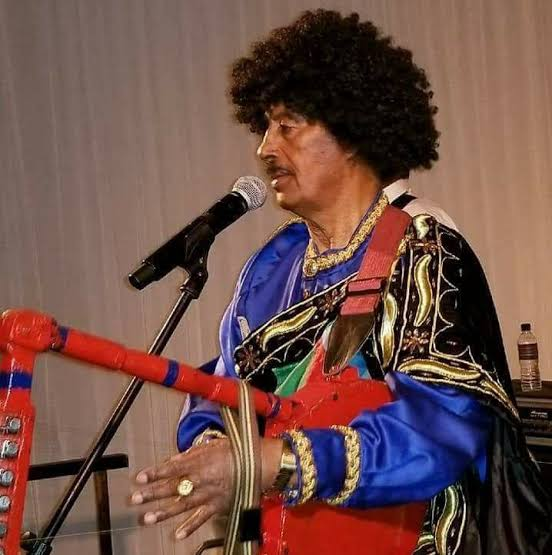
- Mengsteab performing in 2021

Background information
- Born: 1938; Hazega, Italian East Africa
- Died: 12 November 2025 (aged 86–87) Asmara, Eritrea
- Instrument: Kirar

Bereket Mengisteab (Tigrinya: በረኸት መንግስተኣብ; 1938 – 12 November 2025) was an Eritrean songwriter, composer and singer.

== Life and career ==
=== Early life ===
Bereket was born in 1938 in Hazega, an Eritrean village approximately 20 km (12 mi) northwest of Asmara, the nation's current capital. He spent his early life in the village farming, where he taught himself to play the krar and took part in musical events that were part of the local area's culture. He moved to Asmara for a few years, where his musical performances were limited to his friends.

=== Addis Ababa ===
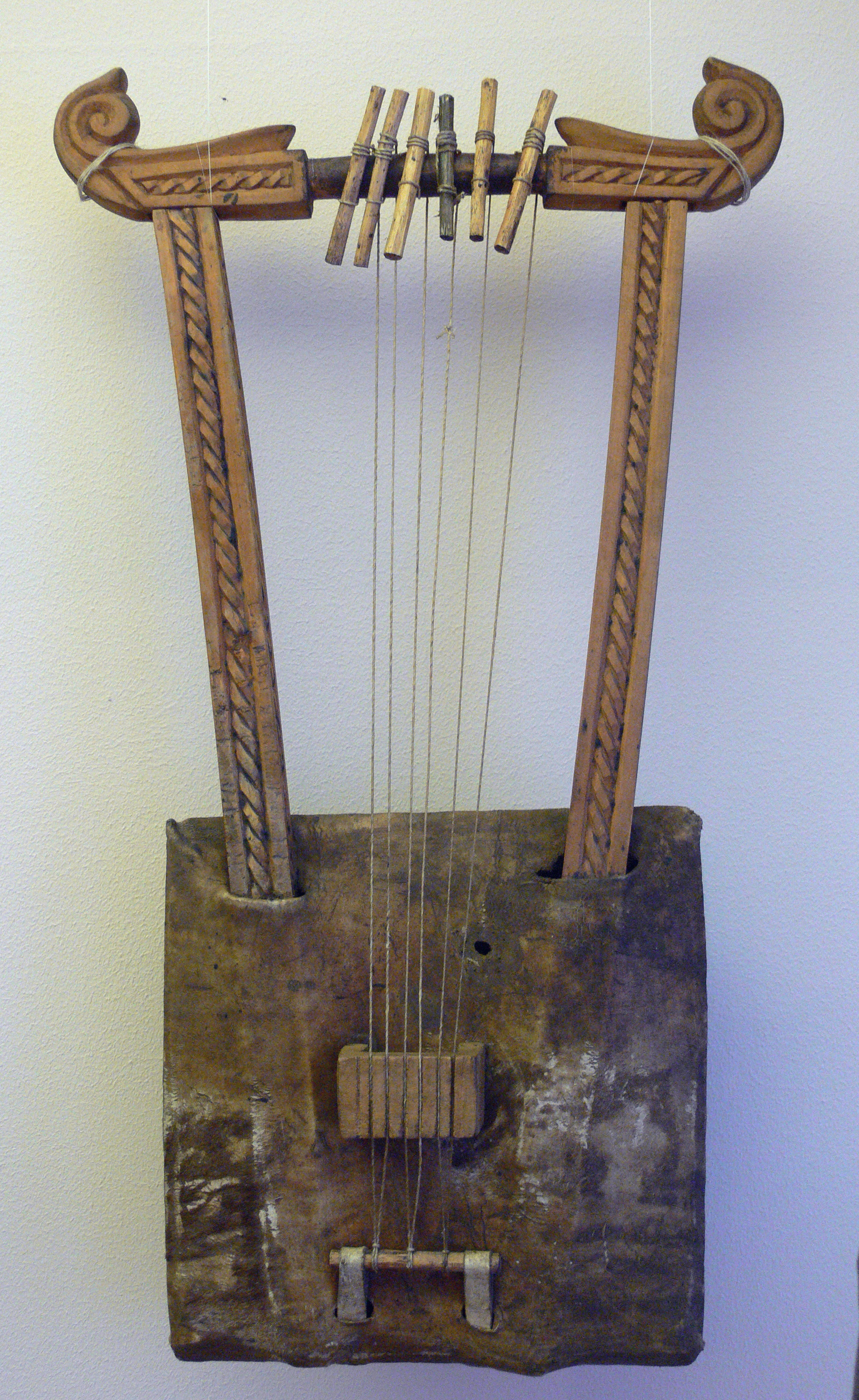
Krar in Stuttgart, Linden-Museum

In 1961, he moved to Addis Ababa and joined the Haile Selassie Theater Orchestra. He remained with the orchestra for over a decade and performed with them across Ethiopia, as well as in Kenya, Uganda, Tanzania, at the 1966 Festival mondial des Arts Nègres in Senegal, and at the 1968 Summer Olympics in Mexico City. He recorded his first nine singles during this period, all for the Philips label. He left the orchestra in 1973, a year before Haile Selassie was deposed by the "Derg" led by Mengistu Haile Mariam. During the mid-1970s, Bereket was the only Eritrean artist broadcast on Ethiopian radio; his krar music and usage of the Tigrinya language contributed to his popularity. While living in Addis Ababa, Bereket and his wife ran a music shop. He formed his own group in Addis Ababa called Megaleh Guayla (Echo of the Dance).

=== Eritrean Liberation Front ===
In 1974, Bereket joined the Eritrean Liberation Front (ELF) to fight for Eritrean independence. He received military training and fought in the mountains of Eritrea. Bereket was also part of the official ELF band. The ELF (and the Eritrean People's Liberation Front) formed cultural troupes as part of their attempts to establish an Eritrean "folk culture". Bereket was one of several experienced artists who contributed to the ELF's sociocultural and political transformation, as well as to nationalist propaganda efforts. The cultural troupes toured "liberated areas" under the liberation front's control, putting on shows for fighters and civilians. Bereket performed revolutionary songs, nationalist anthems, and ballads in military camps and villages.

=== Exile ===
Like many other ELF fighters, Bereket went into exile in Saudi Arabia in 1979. He moved to Jeddah in 1979, where he remained for ten years. During his time in exile, he often performed in Saudi Arabia, Sudan, and Djibouti; he also made his North American debut in 1980. He recorded ten cassettes during his time in Jeddah.

=== Return ===
In 1993, when Eritrea declared its independence and gained international recognition, Bereket was invited to tour the country and performed in Massawa, Keren, and Asmara. He left Jeddah and moved back to Addis Ababa to re-open his music shop with his wife. He left Ethiopia in 1998 when the Eritrean–Ethiopian War broke out, and moved to Asmara in Eritrea. After moving to Asmara, Bereket continued to compose and perform music. He toured and released about one new cassette each year. His music shop, "B. M. Music House," is currently located in Babylon Square, Asmara.

== Death ==
Bereket died on 12 November 2025.

== Music ==
In a 2009 interview, Bereket said he had recorded around 200 out of a total of 250 songs he had composed over the past fifty years.

== Discography ==
=== Albums ===
- Hagerey Afqire (c. 1978)
- Bitihti Gezana (Guitar Version)(c. 1979)
- Baburey (c. 1980)
- Libey-Vol. 5 (1984)
- Hagerey-Vol. 7 (1989)
- Tarik-Vol.8 (1990)
- Tsehay Tewelida-Vol. 9 (1991)
- Bshimkum-Vol. 10 (1992)
- Nehna Hager-Vol. 11 (1993)
- Alimna-Vol. 12 (1995)
- Hizbi Ertra-Vol. 13 (1999)
- Tsnat-Vol. 14 (2001)
- Hizbi Alem-Vol. 15 (2007)
- Balena-Vol. 21 (2011)

=== Compilation albums ===
- Bereket Mengisteab (1961-1974) Vol. 1-Embaba Adey (2003)
- Bereket Mengisteab (1961-1974) Vol. 2-Milena (2004)
- Bereket Mengisteab (1961-1974) Vol. 3-Meley (2005)
- Bereket Mengisteab (1961-1974) Vol. 4-Ufey Breri (2005)
