= North Western administration =

North Western
- Administration
- Country: Eritrea
- Region: Maekel
- Time zone: UTC+3 (GMT +3)

North Western administration is an administration in the central Maekel region (Zoba Maekel) of Eritrea.
