= Ribka Sibhatu =

Eritrean writer (born 1962)

Ribka Sibhatu (born September 18, 1962) is an Eritrean writer. She writes in Tigrinya and Italian.

== Career ==
She was born in Asmara. She was put in prison in 1979 for one year because she refused to marry an Ethiopian officer and then left the country the following year. She lived in Ethiopia, where she completed high school and studied at the Istituto Tecnico Galileo Galilei. There she married a man from France in 1985 and moved to France the following year, living in Paris and then Lyon. After the marriage ended, she moved to Italy in 1996 and settled in Rome. Sibhatu received a PhD in communication studies from La Sapienza. She worked for the city council in Rome from 2002 to 2005 as a consultant on inter-cultural politics. In 2006, she became a member of the scientific committee for inter-cultural affairs of the Italian Ministry of Education, Universities and Research.

The Centre for the Study of Contemporary Women's Writing (CCWW) has created a documentary about her life.

== Works ==
Sibhatu's works use a traditional Eritrean format, the ‘aulò’, which are spoken poems recited at public events (e.g., weddings, funerals, and commemorations). These ‘aulò’ are memorized and re-interpreted to suit different events.

In 1993, she published Aulò. Un canto-poesia dall'Eritrea, a collection of poems first written in Tigrinya and then translated by Sibhatu into Italian. In 1999, she published Cittadino che non c'è. L'immigrazione nei media Italiani. She published L’esatto numero delle stelle e altre fiabe dell’altopiano eritreo in 2012.

In 2012, Simone Brioni, Graziano Chiscuzzu and Ermanno Guida made a documentary about and with her called Aulò. Roma Postcoloniale.

In Lampedusa is in Modern Poetry in Translation.

In 2022, The Italian Riveter: Two Poems by Ribka Sibhatu, translated by André Naffis-Sahely were published in EuroLitNetwork.
