= Culture of Eritrea =

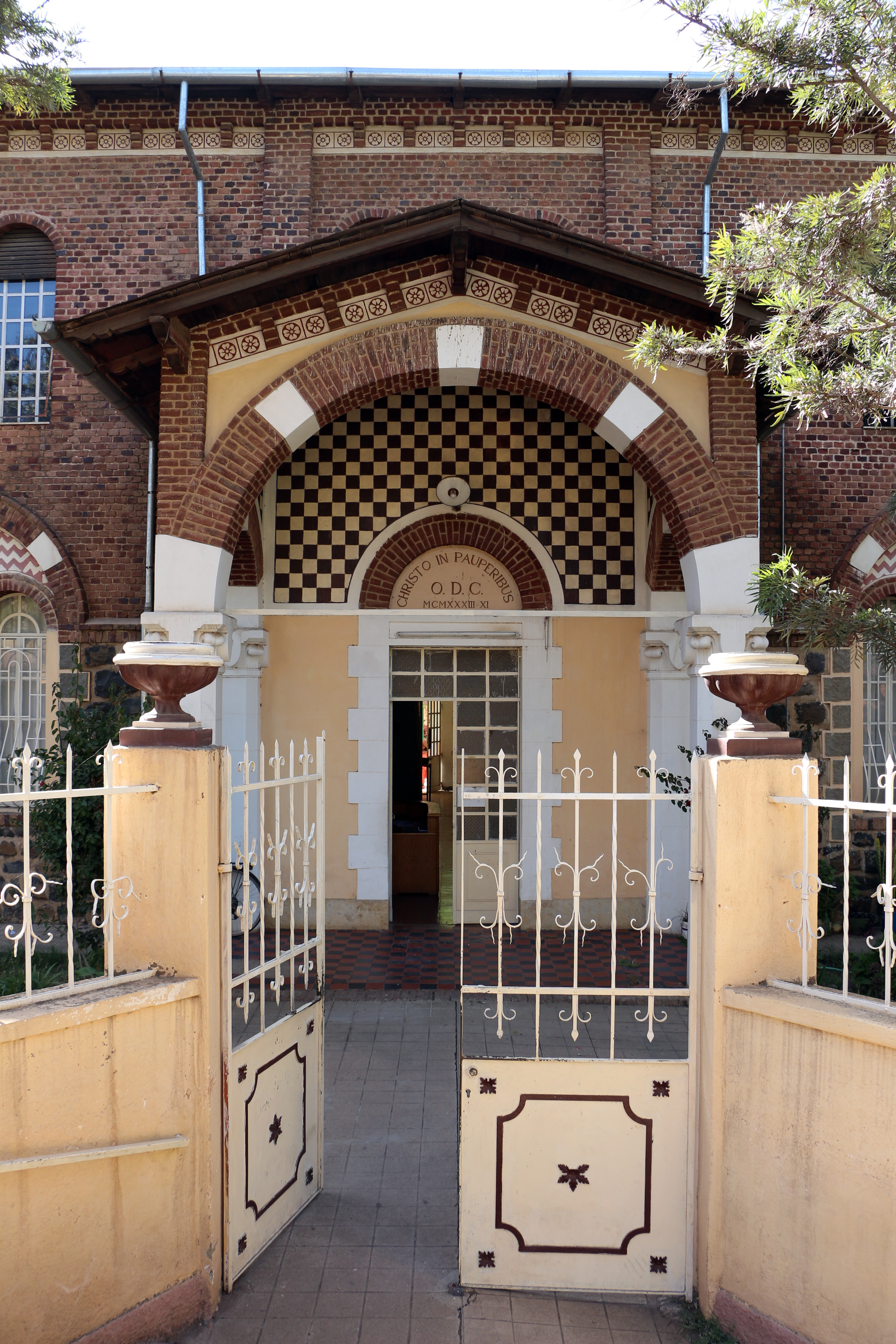
The National Museum of Eritrea is a national museum in Asmara, Eritrea

The culture of Eritrea is the collective cultural heritage of the various populations native to Eritrea. Eritrea has nine recognized ethnic groups. Each group have their own unique traditions and customs but some traditions are shared and appreciated among different ethnic groups. The local culture consists of various, and often quite similar, traditions practiced by the nation's many Cushitic and Ethiopian Semitic-speaking Afro-Asiatic ethnic groups, in addition to those practiced by the area's Nilotic minorities. Eritrean culture is in some ways similar to the cultures of other countries in the region.

== Coffee ceremony ==
One of the most recognizable parts of Eritrean culture is the coffee ceremony. Coffee (Ge'ez ቡን būn) is offered when visiting friends, during festivities, or as a daily staple of life. If coffee is politely declined then most likely tea ("shy" ሻሂ shahee) will be served. The coffee is brewed by first roasting the green coffee beans over hot coals in a brazier. Once the beans are roasted each participant is given an opportunity to sample the aromatic smoke by wafting it towards them. The coffee roasting smoke are sometimes used to fill the rooms with a pleasant scent. This is followed by the grinding of the beans, traditionally in a wooden mortar and pestle.

The coffee grounds are then put into a special vessel, called a jebena, and boiled. A jebena is usually made of clay and has a spherical base, a neck and pouring spout and a handle where the neck connects with the base. When the coffee boils up through the neck it is poured in and out of another container to cool it, and then is put back into the jebena until it happens again. To pour the coffee from the jebena a filter made from horsehair or other material is placed in the spout of the jebena to prevent the grounds from escaping.

The host pours the coffee for all participants by moving the tilted jebena over a tray with small, handleless cups (finjal) without stop until each cup is full. Some of the coffee will inevitably miss the cup but this is done to prevent the coffee grounds from contaminating the brew. One extra cup is poured each time. The grounds are brewed four times: the first round of coffee is called awel, the second kale'i, the third bereka ('to be blessed') and the fourth is called "dereja". However, the "dereja" is not always poured, it is mostly poured when elders are present. The coffee ceremony may also include burning of various traditional incense such as frankincense or gum arabic.

== Cuisine ==
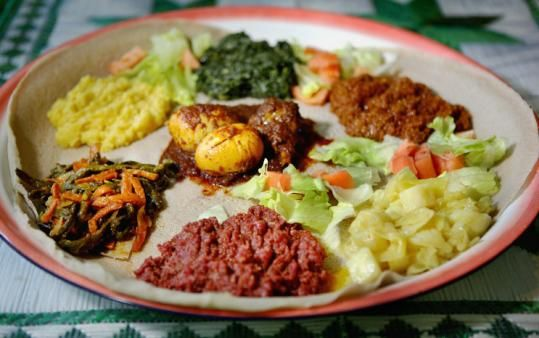
A plate of Injera with various Eritrean stews

Typically, Eritrean cuisine consists of various stews (tsebhi) made from vegetables and meat, and served atop a large, flat sourdough bread called injera, tayta, "shuro", "alicha" and "hamly". Many vegetarian dishes are available since a majority of the population observe fasting at some time during the year. Eating is accomplished without utensils by tearing a piece of injera (strictly using the right hand), then scooping some stew, vegetables or salad with the bread.

On visiting an Eritrean household, it is polite to decline at least three times if asked to dine. Usually the host will say "bezay kelalem", after which the guest may agree to dine. This process ensures that one does not seem too eager to eat at another's household. When one visits an Eritrean house regardless of whether they are served with food or not, they are always served with hot tea.

Suwa is the name for the home-brewed beer common in Eritrea. It is made from roasted corn, barley and other grain and is flavored with gesho, a type of buckthorn leaf. The beverage is often made for celebrations; a sweet honey wine (called Mies) is also commonly served.

In addition, Eritrean cuisine has a lot of Italian dishes from the Italian Eritrean cuisine introduced during Italian Eritrea. It is more common to find people eating the Italian Eritrean cuisine in the capital, Asmara. Asmara has been regarded as "New Rome" or "Italy's African City" due to its Italian influence, not only in the architecture, but also for the wide streets, piazzas (town squares) and coffee bars. In the boulevards, lined with palms and trees, there are many Italian style bars, restaurants and cafes, serving cappuccinos and lattes, as well as gelato parlours. Many Eritreans drink the espresso coffee, made using original Italian machinery. Pizza is one of the favorite foods of the young people in Asmara.

== Music ==
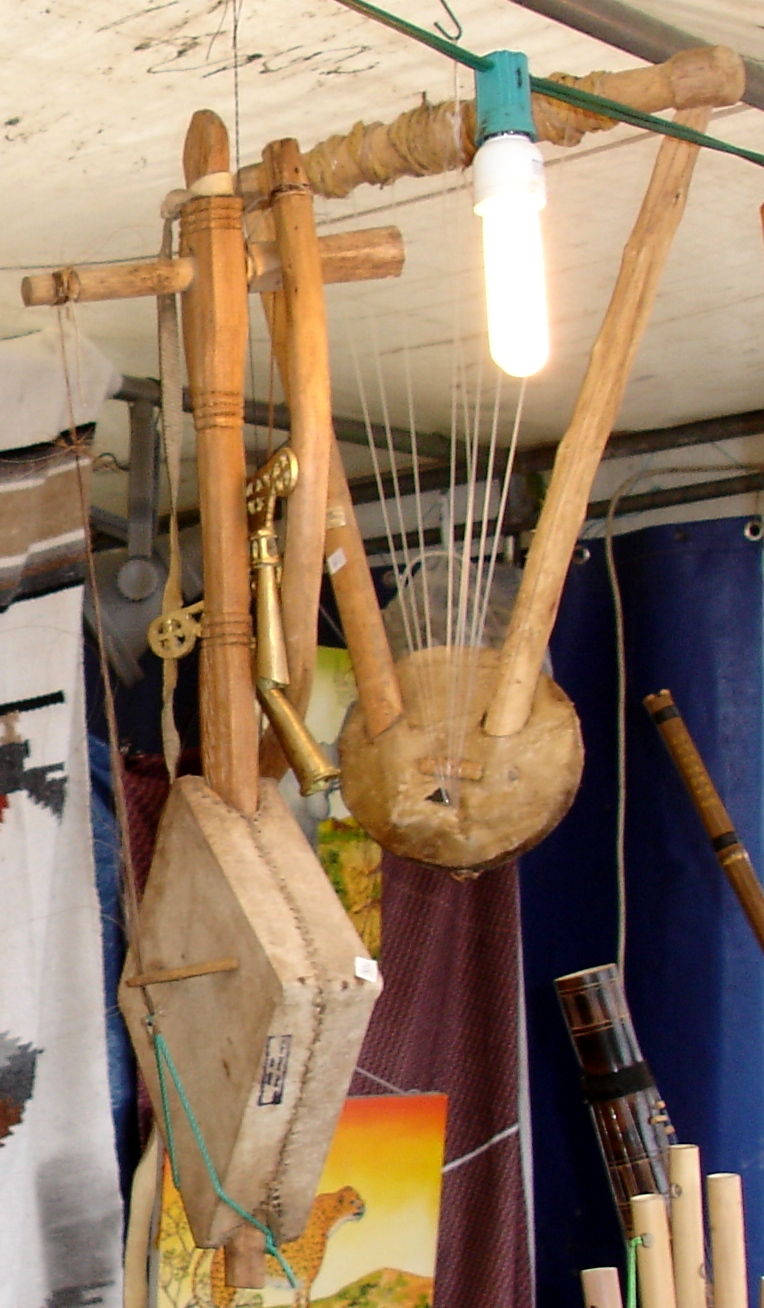
An Eritrean krar and masinqo is a common instruments in Eritrea.

Eritrea has nine ethnic groups, each of which have their own different styles of music and accompanying dances. A common instrument used by many of the communities is the drum. Amongst the Tigray-Tigrinya, the best known traditional musical genre is called guaila.

== Religions ==
There are two major religions in Eritrea, Christianity and Islam. Pew research estimates that 63.5% are Christian, and 36.5% follows Islam, In 2010, the United States Department of State (USDoS) estimated that 65% of the population was Christian and around 35% was Muslim. The Muslims are concentrated in the eastern and western lowlands,& highlands whereas the Christians mainly inhabit the highlands. Religious denominations with fewer than 5% adherents include Protestants, Seventh-day Adventists, Jehovah's Witnesses, Baha'is, Buddhists and Hindus. Followers of traditional faiths comprise around 2% of residents. There are very few irreligious individuals, and participation in religious activity is generally high.

== See also ==
- Cuisine of Eritrea
- Literature of Eritrea
- List of museums in Eritrea
