= Debarwa =

Market town in central Eritrea

Debarwa ድባርዋ دباروا
- Market town
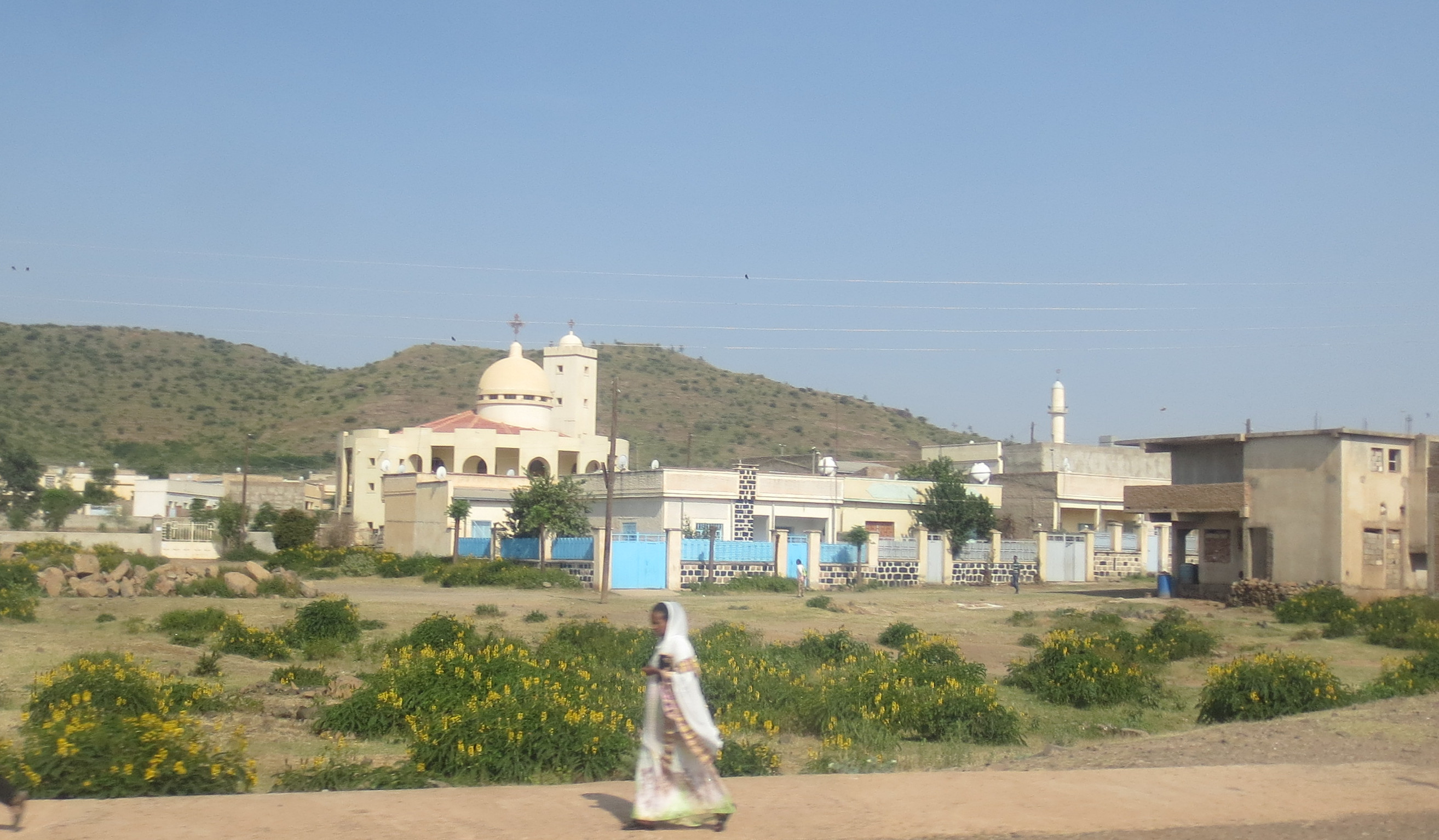
- The church of Debarwa

- Location in Eritrea.
- Coordinates: 15°06′N 38°50′E
- Country: Eritrea
- Region: Debub
- District: Debarwa

Population
  - Total: 25,000
- Time zone: UTC+3 (EAT)

Debarwa (Tigrinya: ድባርዋ Tigrinya pronunciation: [dɨbarwa]) is a market town in central Eritrea. It is situated about 25 kilometers south of the capital Asmara, and has a population of about 25,000 inhabitants. It is the capital of the Debarwa district (Tsilima) in the Debub ("Southern") administrative region (one of five in Eritrea).

== History ==
Debarwa was one of the most important settlements in the region during the medieval era. An Ethiopian monk, Brother Antonio, told the Venetian scholar Alessandro Zorzi that it was the "chief city" and residence of a nobleman known as the Bahr Negash. Portuguese traveler Francisco Álvares, who visited the town describes that it was the site of the ruler's "principal palaces". Alvares describes the town as "very good," perched on a high rock above the Mereb River, with the Bahr Negash's house resembling a fortress. Guarded by over 300 mounted men, it was a hub of daily petitions, attracting many visitors and young women drawn to the wealthy courtiers. The town had over 300 households and a bustling Thursday market with 300–400 traders, mainly bartering, while women managed goods and trade. Two linked churches, St. Michael for men and Peter and Paul for women, also served the community.

The area was disrupted in 1535 when Ahmed ibn Ibrahim al-Ghazi overran the region. The Portuguese expedition under Cristóvão da Gama spent the rainy season of 1542 in Debarwa, Miguel Castanhoso, a member of the Portuguese force, found the region "depopulated through fears of the Moors", for "the inhabitants had taken refuge with their herds on a mountain." The seizure of Massawa by the Ottomans in 1557 and their subsequent advance inland led to further difficulties. The Turks soon occupied Deberwa and established a fort with "a long wall and a very high tower," reportedly full of gold and silver objects, precious stones, and costly imported goods. The Turks attempted to use this fort to expand their power into the surrounding area, but were forced to withdraw back to the coast due to attacks by the local population.

Conflict flared up again in 1561, during the reign of Emperor Menas who was in bad relations with the Bahr Negash Yeshaq. The latter according to James Bruce, rebelled against the Emperor and upon being defeated "threw himself at the mercy of the Turks." At the price of their help he ceded Deberwa to the Turks. In 1576, the Ethiopian Emperor Sarsa Dengel attacked Debarwa whereupon the Turkish garrison surrendered with all its firearms. Sarsa Dengel then seized the vast riches stored by the Turks in Debarwa and ordered the destruction of the mosque and the fort that was erected during the Ottoman occupation.

The French traveller Charles-Jacques Poncet visited the town in 1699 and described it as being "the capital of the kingdom of Tigra". Though still a flourishing political and commercial center in Poncet's day, Debarwa was beginning to be overshadowed by the more southernly town of Adwa, which soon became the main metropolis of northern Ethiopia. With the decline of Debarwa, the status of the Bahr Negash further dwindled. Poncet noted that the office had been divided with two separate officials bearing the title who established themselves in different localities.

The town was hit hard by a typhus epidemic in 1893, which followed the misery of the Great Famine (1888-1892). A French visitor described Debarwa as "decimated", and all that was left of the once prosperous town were "a few piles of stones, an almost ruined church, and a few wretched hovels".

== Demographics ==
The majority of the population in Debarwa belongs to the Bihér-Tigrigna Tigrinya people. In terms of faith, local residents are mainly adherents of the Eritrean Orthodox Tewahdo Church.

== Economy ==
Local people bring produce such as potatoes, tomatoes, chickens and grain to the market every Saturday. Aside from being a market town, it is also a mining town with resources of high grade gold, copper, silver and zinc, and an important transport route between the south-west corner of Zoba Debub and Asmara. The Japanese company Hitachi once operated a mine near Debarwa, but it was shut down in the 1960s due to the outbreak of the Eritrean War of Independence from Ethiopia.
