= Woldemichael Solomon =

Eritrean military leader and nationalist (1820–1906)

Ras Woldemichael Solomon
- Born: c. 1820; Hazega, Hamasien
- Died: 1906 (aged 85–86); Aksum, Tigray
- Spouse: Woizero Altash daughter of Dejazmach Whade Woldekidan
- Military career
- Conflicts: Ethiopian-Egyptian War: Battle of Gundet

Ras Woldemichael Solomon (Tigrinya: ወልደሚካኤል ሰሎሙን) served as the Ras (Duke) of Hamasien during the 19th century. Raesi Woldemichael was born in Hazega village in Hamassien. He is the eldest son of Abeto Solomon Zerai of Hazega and Woizero Ileni. He was the last hereditary ruler to be in power in Mereb Melash.

== Life ==
Raesi Woldemichael was born into one of the traditional ruling families of Mereb Melash, the House of Hazega. His mother was Ileni Hagos, the governor of Hamsen. He was married to woizero Altash, daughter of Dejazmach Whade Woldekidan, son of Shum Tembien Woldekidan Woldemichael. Upon the death of Emperor Tewodros II in 1868, then ruler of Tigray (and later Emperor), Dejazmatch Yohannes IV appointed his ally Woldemichael the Governor of Hamasien and Seraye. In doing so, Tewodros' former appointee Dejazmatch Hailu Teweldemedhin of the rival House of Tsazega was replaced.

Under the leadership of now Emperor Yohannes IV, Woldemichael fought in the Battle of Gundet against Egyptian forces under Khedive Isma'il Pasha, who sought to bring the entire Nile River Basin under his rule. The Khedive entrusted the Danish mercenary Colonel Adolf Arendrup to annex Hamasien and Seraye, and then proceed towards Adwa. Following some minor skirmishes, the forces of the Khedive met the Abyssinian forces at Gundet on the morning of 16 November 1875. Ras Alula took command of the left flank, the forces of Yohannes on the right, with Woldemichael taking command of the center and rear in light of his greater knowledge of the area. The Egyptians were tricked into a narrow and steep valley and were wiped out by the Abyssinian gunners surrounding the valley from the surrounding mountains. Virtually the entire Egyptian force, along with its many officers of European and North American background were killed. News of this huge defeat was suppressed in Egypt for fear that it would undermine the government of the Khedive.

In early December 1875, an Egyptian force of 20,000 men landed at Massawa and subsequently marched inland to seize Mereb Melash. Woldemichael who resented the Emperor's preference for Ras Alula and feared that Yohannes intended to re-appoint Woldemichael's rival Hailu as governor, defected to the Egyptians and offered his services. His submission allowed the Egyptians to occupy Khaya Khur and Gura where two strong zaribas were constructed. Following the defeat of the Egyptians at the Battle of Gura, Woldemichael fled to Egyptian-controlled Bogos and went into open revolt against Yohannes. He defeated his rival Hailu at the Battle of Weki Duba, Hailu was killed and his followers fled to Tigray, Woldemichael then burnt Tsazega to the ground before returning to Bogos. Yohannes then appointed Ras Baryau Gebretsadiq as governor of Mereb Melash. Raesi Baryau governorship was however short-lived, with Woldemichael confronting and soundly defeating him at Biet Mekae near Asmara. Yohannes then appointed Ras Alula as governor, tasking him to end Woldemichael's revolt.

In September 1877, Ras Alula invaded Hamasien with 20,000 troops, he defeated Woldemichael at Aylet and then seized the road to Bogos to cut off his escape. Woldemichael along with 300 men were force to submit to Ras Alula at Aksum, he then travelled to Debre Tabor to meet Yohannes, who confirmed his title of Ras and appointed him as the vice governor of Mereb Melash to use him as a check against Alula. Alula then plotted against Woldemichael by falsely accusing him of being in secret communications with the Egyptians at Sanhit, he and Alula were ordered to come to Debre Tabor for trial in December 1879. In January 1880 Woldemichael was condemned by the Emperor and subsequently imprisoned on top of Amba Aradam. He was released 11 years later and lived in forced retirement in Aksum until his death in 1906.
