= Provinces of Eritrea =

The provinces of Eritrea existed since pre-Axumite times and became administrative provinces from Eritrea's incorporation as a colony of Italy until the conversion of the provinces into administrative regions. Many of the provinces had their own local laws since the 13th century.

== Overview ==
In Italian Eritrea, the Italian colonial administration had divided the colony into eight provinces (administrative regions) called Akele Guzay, Barka, Denkalia, Hamasien, Sahel, Semhar, Senhit and Serae. These administrative regions relied heavily upon the historical political boundaries in the region, including, but not exclusively, that of local nobility. These provinces of Eritrea were also used by the Federated Eritrean Government from 1952 to 1962 and as districts (awrajja) in Eritrea when it was annexed by Ethiopia from 1962 to 1991.

After independence, the Provisional Government of Eritrea converted the original eight provinces of Eritrea (from the Italian colonial period) to nine provinces by splitting the Barka province in two (the north known as Barka Province and the south as Gash-Setit Province), while at the same time separating Asmara from the rest of Hamasien. On April 15, 1996, the Government of Eritrea converted the then nine provinces of Eritrea into six administrative regions.

== Akele Guzai ==
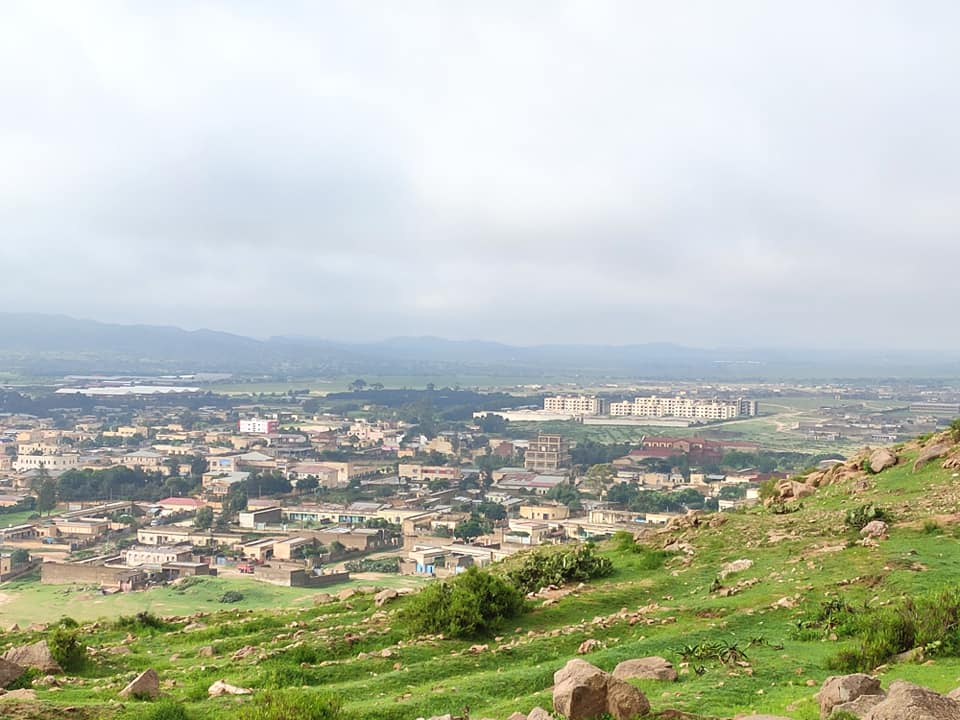
Town of Dekemhare

Akele Guzai (ምድረ ቡር ) was a historical province of Eritrea until 1996 when the newly Eritrean government consolidated all provinces into six regions. It extends from Dekemhare to the town of Senafe. The province's estimated population was 360,000 in 1990 and had an area of 8400 km2 km^{2}, is mostly consisted of Tigrinya and Saho ethnic groups. Akele Guzai is home to more than three-fourths of the total Saho-speaking population in Eritrea. The Tigrinya people of Akele Guzai are mostly followers of the Eritrean Orthodox Tewahedo Church while the Saho are predominantly majority from Sunni Muslim. The province of Akele Guzai is now mostly part of the Northern Red Sea Region and the Southern Region.

=== History ===
Akele Guzai is one of the most ancient regions of Eritrea. It has an inscriptional record going back to at least the 9th century BC, the earliest example of the Ge'ez script. The province was part of Dʿmt, which would evolve into the Kingdom of Aksum.

Akele Guzai's name has been connected to the Gaze of the Monumentum Adulitanum (which later medieval Greek notes in the margins associate with the Aksumite people). If the note regarding the Gaze is accurate, it would connect the name of Akele Guzai to the Agʿazyān or Agʿazi (Ge'ez speakers) of the Kingdom of Dʿmt in Eritrea and northern Ethiopia. This connection has been rejected by linguists in modern times, however, due to the lack of the middle voiced pharyngeal fricative in the triliteral roots, which is usually preserved in Tigrinya.

Along with Agame in eastern Tigray, it was the main center of Aksumite culture, with a distinct sub-culture that separated the two regions from that of Central Tigray (Shire, Axum, Yeha), Central Eritrea (Serae, Hamasien, and Adulis), and frontier areas in northern Eritrea and the southern regions of Wag, Lasta and Angot in Ethiopia.

In the Middle Ages, parts of southern Akele Guzai were part of the larger province of Bur, Ethiopia, which also included Agame, some northeastern Afar lowlands, and the Buri Peninsula; southern Akele Guzai and Agame were part of "Upper" (La'ilay) Bur, while the lowlands were further distinguished as "Lower" (Tahtay).

== Barka ==
Barka was a province of Eritrea until 1996, when it was divided between the present-day Gash-Barka and Anseba regions. Its capital was Agordat. It had an area of 12,819 mi^{2} (20630.180736000002 km^{2}).

== Denkalia ==
Denkalia was a province of Eritrea until 1996, when it was divided between present-day Northern Red Sea and Southern Red Sea regions of Eritrea. Its capital was Assab.

== Hamasien ==
Hamasien (Ge’ez: ሐማሴን; Tigrinya: ሓማሴን) is the historical name of Eritrea with the capital named Tza'azega (Tigrinya: ጸዓዘጋ). Later, under Italian Colonial rule and subsequent Ethiopian rule, Hamassien became a province. In 1987 it had a population of 623,000 people and an area of 4,400 km^{2}. In 1996 the province was divided and distributed amongst the modern Maekel, Debub, Northern Red Sea, Gash-Barka, and Anseba regions.

Hamasien's population predominantly follow Oriental Orthodox Christianity and are members of the Eritrean Orthodox Tewahdo Church, with a considerable minority from the Sunni Muslim, Roman Catholic, and Lutheran communities. Hamasien was politically influential within the Eritrean highlands, in Eritrea and the whole region.

=== History ===
The former province Hamassien was the political and economic center of Eritrea; judging from excavations in the Sembel area outside Asmara, it has been so since at least the 9th century BC. The earliest surviving appearance of the name "Hamasien" is believed to have been the region ḤMS²M, i.e. ḤMŠ, mentioned in a Sabaic inscription of the Axumite king Ezana. The region may have been mentioned as early as Puntite times by Ancient Egyptian records as 'MSW (i.e. "Amasu"), a region of Punt.

Hamsien appears on indigenous maps of the northern Horn of Africa in the 15th century. It was governed by a chief called Zarsanāy in the sixteenth century during the Adal Sultanate occupation.

Hamassien would be ruled by a governor known as the Bahr Negash during the Zagwe and Solomonic dynasties. With the decline of the importance of the Midri Bahri in the 17th century, the province enjoyed a period of communal rule under councils of village elders, the so-called shimagile who enforced traditional laws which had prevailed uniquely in the region alongside feudal authority since ancient times. Following the death of Emperor Yohannes at the Battle of Gallabat, Hamasien was occupied by the Italians, who incorporated it into their colony of Eritrea and making one of its villages, Asmara, the capital of the colony, a status it retains today as the capital of the sovereign country of Eritrea.

== Sahel ==
Sahel was a former province of Eritrea until 1996, when it was absorbed into the present-day Northern Red Sea region. Its capital was Nakfa.

== Semhar ==
Semhar is the name of a former province of Eritrea, which has now become almost incorporated into the Northern Red Sea Region when the number and names of provinces were unilaterally changed in 1996. The province was thinly settled with Massawa as the provincial capital. The population is mainly Tigre, Afar, Saho and Tigrinya. The Tigre and Tigrinya language are mainly spoken. The population is mainly pastoralist and agro-pastroalist.

It is a common name for Eritrean females and at times males as well. Semhar is also a city in Eritrea.

== Senhit ==
Senhit was a former province of Eritrea until 1996, when it was absorbed into the present-day Anseba region. Its capital was Keren.

== Serae ==
Serae or Seraye (Tigrigna/Tigre/Ge’ez: ሰራየ) is a former province of Eritrea which had an estimated population of 915,000 in 1990 (the most populous province) and an area of 8,608 km^{2} (3,324 sq mi). The province is home to two of the Eritrean ethnic groups namely the Tigrinya and Tigre. It has since been incorporated primarily into the Debub Region, though some western districts have become part of the Gash-Barka region. It is believed that the name of the province is from the "dark forests" which once thrived on its fertile ground.

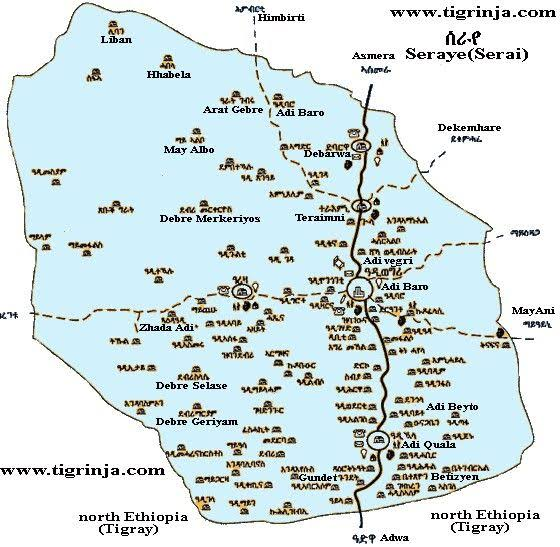
Seraye map until 1990s

Today the region is home to twelve monasteries of the Eritrean Orthodox Church as well as a number of new factories in the town of Mendefera.

=== Districts ===
- Debub ደቡብ
- GuH'tsi'A ጉሕጭዓ
- Mai Tsa'eda ማይጻዕዳ/ ማጫዕዳ
- Enda Azmach Oqbit እንዳዝማች ዑቕቢት
- Deqi Bokhri ደቂ ቦኽሪ
- Meraguz መራጉዝ
- QoHain ቆሓይን
- Gundet ጒንደት
- Aila ዓይላ
- Sef'a ሰፍኣ
- Harfe Gurotto ሃርፈጒረቶ
- Deqi Digna ደቂ ድግና
- Deqi Aites ደቂ ጣዒስ
- Medri Wedi’Sebera ምድሪ ወዲ’ሰበራ
- Dembelas ደምበላስ
- Zaide'kolom ዛይደ'ኮሎም
- Anagir ዓናግር
- Tekela ተኸላ
- Kuno Redae ኲኖ ረዳእ
- Etan Zere ዕጣን ዘርአ
- Misyam ምስያም
- Medri Felasi ምድሪ ፈላሲ
- Timzea - ትምዝኣ

=== History ===
Serae/Seraye which in old books called as Sarawi (ሰራዊ) is an ancient entity which was a region of the Kingdom of D'mt, which would evolve in the Kingdom of Aksum. During the Zagwe and Solomonic dynasties, the Bahr Negash would be centered in Debarwa in the province of Seraye. Serae was bound by regions of Akele Guzay in the east, Hamassien in the North, Tigray proper (Adwa/Shire/Axum) in the south and Gash-Setit in the west During this Axumite period, the region became a successful trading region as it lay between the Red Sea port of Adulis, Asmara, and Axum.

In his tablet, Ezana mentions several peoples he had subjugated and refers to himself as the ruler of Aksum, Himyar, Sheba (Saba') and Rydan in Yemen. He also mentions 'Sarawi' as one of the people he subjugated. Furthermore, he mention that he subjugated the king of 'Sarati', (this name crops up in different forms of one of which is Sarawi. It stands for the Eritrean province of 'Serae'), and says that he came to an understanding with him concerning the passage of trade caravans to 'Adulis' peacefully across his country. However, the names of these kingdoms disappeared after the fourth century A.D. Following the fall of Aksum as a united kingdom after the Hamiti Beja tribes overran the Eritrean highlands in the 8th century A.D., the province serae formed an independent state under the administration of its ruler who was called 'Cantibai'. Some scholars wrote that the name Serae origin comes from the Sarat or Sarawat Mountains in South Arabia.

Serae appears on indigenous maps of the northern Horn of Africa in the 15th century.

The Bahr Negash existed until the 1600s. The province had its own written native administration codes that was used from the beginning of the 1400AD, which was named as the law of Adkeme-Miligae. The book existed until the come of the anti Christian jihadist Ahmed ibn Ibrahim al-Ghazi in the 1600s, burning churches and killing the believers and progressing northwards from present-day eastern Ethiopia and Somalia, as a result the book was lost/burnt at that time. The people of Serae were administered without the book verbally until the arrival of the Italians in the end of the 19th century. In 1938 again the book of native law code was written of elderly and knowledgeable people from seven villages (Adi Mongonti, Mayduma, Kudo Felasi, Bet Gabriel, Qine Hayela, Adi Hyis, and May Leham) Logochiwa is part of Hamasien, it is a wereda of Hamasien. Debarwa an ancient city most of the times claimed by some serae extremests as part of serrae is original part of Hamasien.

== See also ==
- Regions of Eritrea
