= Hazega =

Village in Eritrea

Coordinates: 15°22′N 38°45′E

Hazega (Tigrinya: ሃዘጋ) is a Historical village in Central Eritrea located in the Maekel/Central Region or the former province of Hamasien. It is located approximately 10 mi (16 km) north-west from the capital city, Asmara, and 50 mi (80 km) south-east of Keren. It is an entirely Christian village inhabited by the Tigrinya speaking people of Eritrea. The village is located some kilometres west of Emba Derho close to the Anseba river and east of Tsazega at an altitude of 2,323m. In the village there one and among the oldest Orthodox church's of Eritrea (Debre-Tsion kidisti Mariam- was built by Tesfatsion with his family .

== History ==
It was formerly the capital of the Minabe Zerai district (Hazega, Adi Bene, Adi Habteslus, Adi Merawi, Shimjbluk) Hamasien. The village has historical importance as it was challenging its neighbouring village, Tsazega:ጸዓዘጋ to gain rule over the former Province of Hamasien during the 18th and 19th century. However, its brief success in the middle of the 19th century under Raesi Woldemichael Solomon ended with the fall of both Houses, first to Tigrean rule under Raesi Alula and then to the Italians. During the Italian period it seems that the importance of Hazega was rather small, almost no information on the village can be found in the literature of that time. During the Eritrean War for Independence the town was held by the ELF during 1974-1977 and by the EPLF until 1978, when the Dergi broke through Eritrean lines at the neighbouring village of Adi Yaqob. Today Hazega is a village of approximately two thousand inhabitants.

== Notable residents ==
- Raesi Woldemichael Solomon, 19th century Eritrean Nobleman
- Zerai Deres, Eritrean martyr
- Bereket Mengisteab, musician
- Tadesse Abraham, athlete
- Teklemariam Medhin Woldeselassie, athlete
- Aron Kifle, athlete
- Yemane Haileselassie, athlete
