= Tigrinya people =

Ethnic group in Eritrea

Tigrinya
ትግርኛ (Tigrinya)
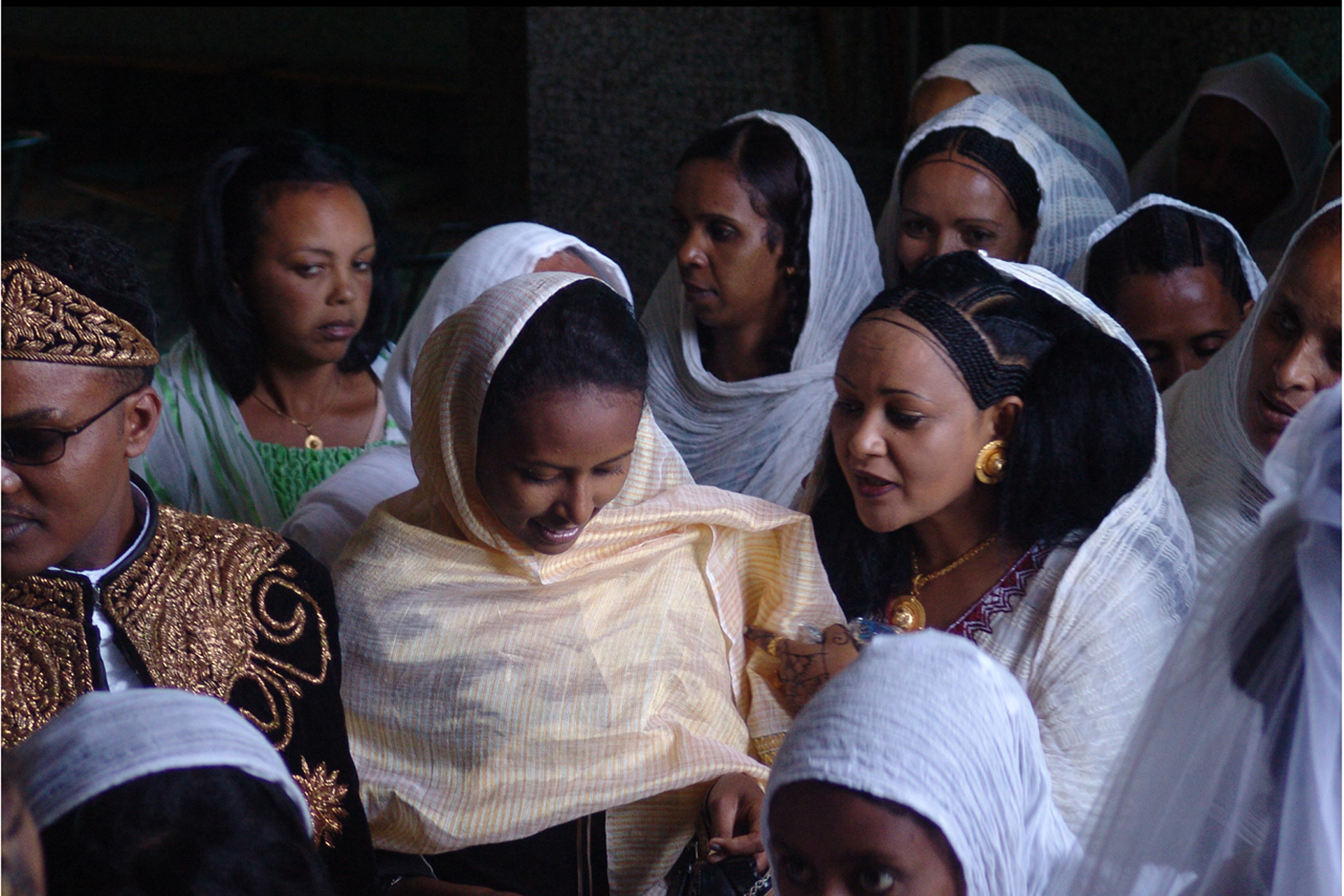
- Eritrean women during a wedding.

Total population
- 3.36 million

Regions with significant populations
- Eritrea

Languages
- Tigrinya

Religion
- Primarily Christianity 90-92% (predominantly Eritrean Orthodox); Minority Islam 8-10%

Related ethnic groups
- Habesha • Tigrayans • Tigre • Amhara

The Tigrinya people (Tigrinya: ትግርኛ, romanized: Təgrəñña, pronounced [tɨɡrɨɲːä]), also known as the Biher-Tigrinya (ብሄረ ትግርኛ, bəherä Təgrəñña) or Kebessa, are a Tigrinya-speaking Habesha ethnic group indigenous to the highlands of Eritrea, specifically the historical provinces of Akele Guzai, Hamasien, Seraye.

== Etymology ==
One view believes that the name comes from the word tägärät (ተገረት), meaning "she ascended". The word tägäru (ተገሩ) "they ascended" describes the ascension of the earliest indigenous people to the mountainous highlands of Eritrea as the plateau's first settlers. The Tigrinya tribe were first mentioned around the 8th to 10th centuries, in which period manuscripts preserving the inscriptions of Cosmas Indicopleustes (fl. 6th century) contain notes on his writings including the mention of a tribe called Tigretes.

The word Kebessa in the form khebsi, has also been found in Ancient Egyptian inscriptions in reference to the Land of Punt, however, concentrating later on during the Ptolemaic period, the word khebsi roughly translates to "those who cut or detach the incense from the tree".

In Tigrinya, Kebessa was originally a geographical term referring to the upper level of the highlands — the coldest and most inhospitable climatic belt north of the Mereb. Among Tigre speakers, Kebessa is used as a place name for their home in the Eritrean highlands, while Habesha refers to the entire Ethio-Eritrean highland region, predominantly inhabited by Tigrinya speakers. Therefore, the suggested connection between the words Kebessa and Habesha is phonetically and semantically untenable. The term Kebessa might derive from the South-Semitic root kbs meaning "to embrace" or "to encompass," and its original meaning might have been "surrounding land" in both Tigrinya and Tigre.

== History ==
The people of the lowland Semhar used Kebessa with the meaning "plunderer," likely due to frequent incursions by highlanders against the lowland Muslims. A place called Midri Kebessa ("land of Kebessa") is mentioned among the lands that Emperor Susenyos I granted to Sela Kristos in 1627; in this context, it refers to a region somewhere in Gojjam. In the colophon of a Gospel book from 1457/58, originating from Debre Bizen (now preserved in the monastery of Kodadu), a decree by Emperor Zara Yaqob is recorded, permitting the people of Hamasien to go to Kebessa and cultivate land there. Here, Kebessa refers to territories southwest of Asmara, still forming the district known as Kebessa Chewa.

Separated from the rest of Abyssinia by the Mereb River, the region of Mereb Melash ("beyond the Mereb") experienced tensions between the imperial authority and local elites, who themselves were often divided by internal rivalries. The core region, Hamasien, was for centuries led by rival families from the villages of Hazega and Tsazega. Sheltered by the Mereb River, these elite groups maintained relative independence, deriving power from external alliances as well as from local raiding and taxation. Conflicts with Tigrayan warlords such as Ras Alula and Mengesha Yohannes led to the local elite collaborating with the Egyptians and later the Italians, though leaders like Bahta Hagos would eventually rebel against Italian colonial rule.

Over the centuries, small groups of Tigrinya people migrated outside their traditional provinces of Hamasien, Akele Guzai and Seraye, some preserving interethnic clan relations. In the 19th century, Tigrinya mercenaries were employed as gunmen in Oromo kingdoms, many of whom seem to be ancestors of Jeberti clans. Tigrinya Muslim traders settled in the Gibe states; one example is Naggaadee Abdulmanna of the early 19th century from, whose descendants taught the Quran in the Kingdom of Gomma. Some Naggaadee ("trader") clans of the Oromo Gibe states are called Tigeroo, Tigre, or Tigrii, descendants of Muslim traders. Another Naggaadee group is the Tigrii Wargii (a sub-group of the Wargii Tuulama), who are present in Shewa, and are active in all urban centers of Oromia. The Tägaro or Tégäro are one of the 34 noble clans of the Kafficho, such as the "Nagado Tigroó" family, whose Christian ancestors arrived in the Kingdom of Kaffa around the 17th century, possibly from modern Eritrea.

== Society ==
Tigrinya society is marked by a strong sense of communitarianism and egalitarian principles, especially in rural areas. This does not exclude the role of elders and local leaders, who traditionally respect communal land rights. Communities are characterized by numerous social institutions that foster mutual support and collaboration. In urban settings, modern associations have taken over the roles of traditional networks, while in rural areas, institutions such as hewenat ("brotherhood") continue to function. These extended families, composed of descendants from a common ancestor, are linked by strong mutual obligations. Village assemblies (bayto) make decisions on local political matters, reflecting both traditional practices and modern state governance. Elders (Shimagile) play a crucial role in preserving oral history, genealogies, and land tenure records, which are essential for maintaining local identity and resolving conflicts. Customary laws are an important part of Eritrean culture. Many communities have codified these laws in written form, and they remain locally valid alongside state law. These laws cover areas such as marriage, inheritance, and conflict resolution.

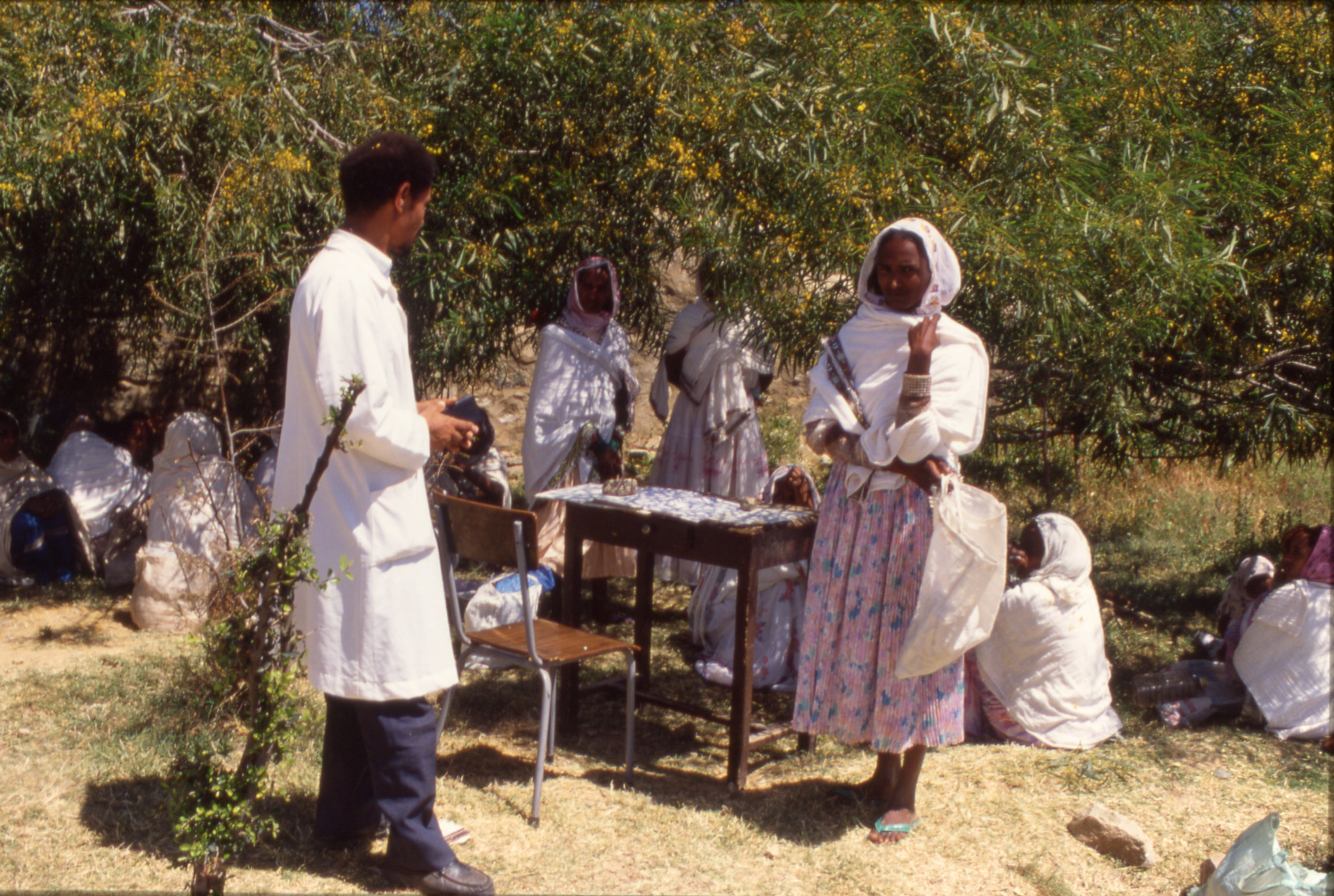
Tigrinya ethnic group of Eritrea at Emba Derho Clinic, Eritrea

=== Subgroups ===
The Tigrinya-speaking population of Eritrea is composed of various subgroups, each with distinct cultural traditions. Among these are the autonomous Maratta of Akele Guzai, the agriculturalist Hamasenay of Hamasien, and cattle herders of Semhar. Assimilation processes have led to the inclusion of other ethnic groups, such as the Agaw settlers in Seraye and some Tigre villages near Keren. Muslim Tigrinya-speakers, often referred to as Jeberti (though the term is sometimes rejected), form a notable subgroup. Historically, they settled near trade routes and important towns like Asmara and Keren engaging in trade and agriculture. Most Eritrean Muslims are Sunnis, with their practices influenced by connections with Sudan, Egypt, Yemen, and the Arabian Peninsula.

== Language ==
Tigrinya is a Semitic language, which originates from Ge'ez. It is the most widely spoken language in Eritrea.
