= Administrations of Asmara =

The administrations of Asmara are the official administrative divisions of Asmara, the capital of Eritrea. Within the city, there are thirteen districts (ንኡስ ዞባ). These districts are administered under North, North-West, North-East, South-East, South-West, East, West and Central areas.

== Districts ==
=== North ===
- Akhrya District (Acria, Mehram Chira, part of Edaga Arbi, Adi Nefas, Durfo)
- Abbashaul District (Abbashaul, Gheza Berhanu, part of Edaga Arbi, Hadish Adi)
- Edaga Hamus District (Edaga Hamus, Embagaliano)

=== North-East ===
- Arba'ete Asmara District (Arba'ete Asmara, Gheza Kenisha, Gheza Tanika, Medeber, Deposito, Beit Gheorgis)

=== North-West ===
- May Temenai District (May Temenai, Seghen)
- Paradiso District (Paradiso, Adi Sogdo, Adi Abeito)

=== South-West ===
- Sembel District (Sembel & Sembel Residential Complex)

=== South-East ===
- Godaif District (Godaif, Bargima, Kahawta)

=== Central ===
- Ma'akel Ketema District (Shuq, Central Zone, Tab'ah)

=== Western ===
- Tiravolo District (Tiravolo, Kagnew Station/Denden Camp, Campo Volo)
- Gejeret District (large (A'bay) Gejeret, small (Neish'toy) Gejeret)

=== Eastern ===
- Gheza Banda District (Ziban Sinkey, Gheza Banda, Ferrovia, Mai Chehot)
- Tsetserat District (Tsetserat, Enda German, Space, Biet Makae, Villaggio, Senita)
