= Central region (Eritrea) =

Administrative region in central Eritrea

Coordinates: 15°20′N 38°55′E

Central region ዞባ ማእከል (Tigrinya) المنطقة المركزية (Arabic)
- Region
- Central region in Eritrea
- Country: Eritrea
- Capital: Asmara

Government
  - Administrator: Ramadan Osman Awliyai

Area
  - Total: 1,300 km^{2} (500 sq mi)

Population
  - Total: 1,053,254
  - Density: 810/km^{2} (2,100/sq mi)
- Demonym: Maekelite
- ISO 3166 code: ER-MA
- HDI (2022): 0.678 medium · 1st

The Central region (Tigrinya: ዞባ ማእከል, romanized: zoba maekel, Arabic: المنطقة المركزية) is an administrative region of Eritrea, located in central Eritrea. The region was formed on 15 April 1996, from the historical province of Hamasien. The region is located on the central plateau, and sits at an average of about 2,250 metres (7,380 ft) above sea level. It contains Asmara, the capital and largest city of Eritrea.

Central is the smallest region in Eritrea, and contains the major city and national capital, Asmara. As of 2005, the region had a population of 675,700 compared to a population of 595,900 in 2001. The net growth rate was 11.81 per cent. The total area of the province was 1,300.00 km^{2} and the density was 519.77 persons per km^{2}.

== Geography ==
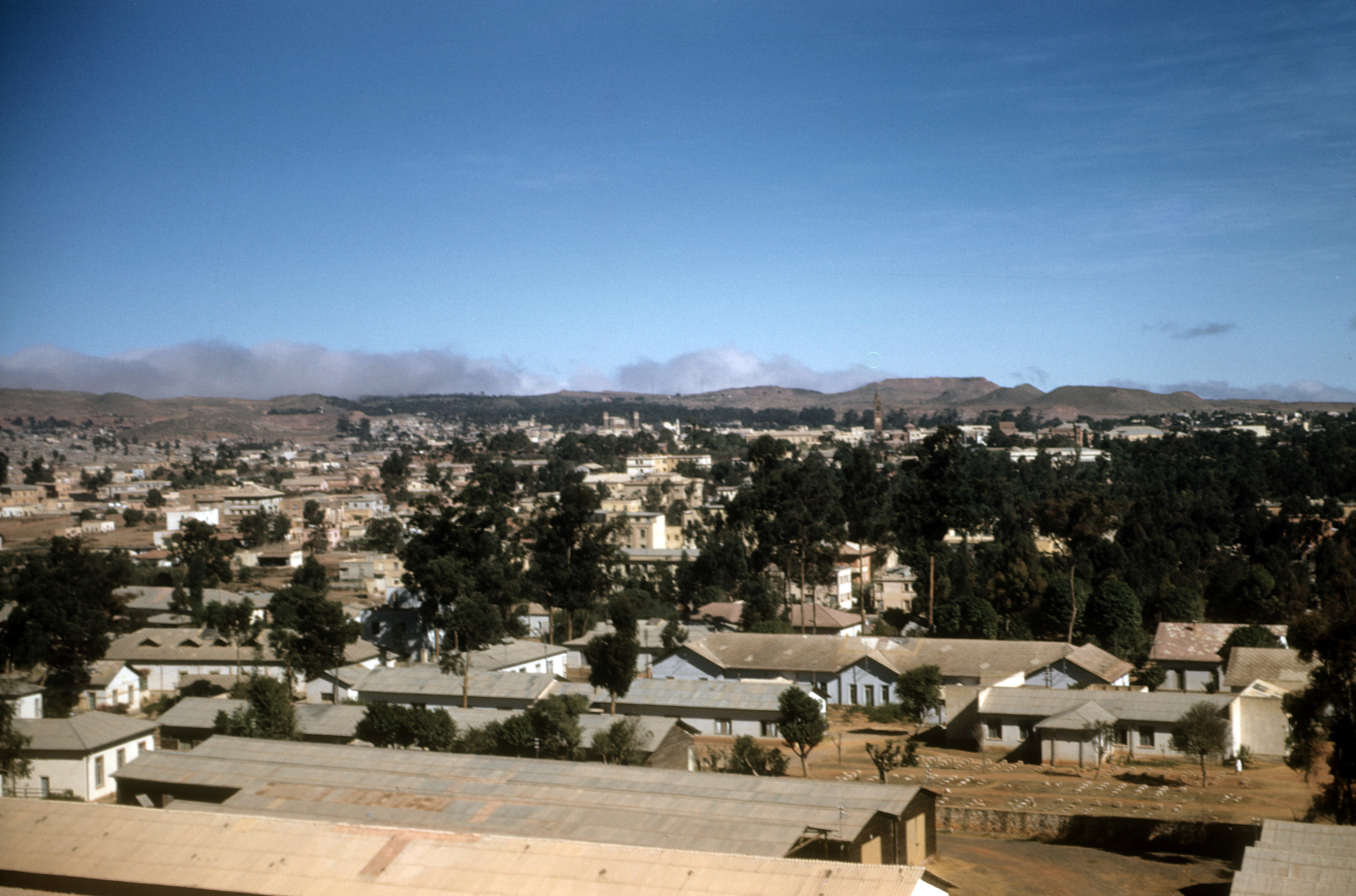
A view of Asmara

The Central region is the smallest region in Eritrea, and contains the major city and national capital, Asmara. The region is situated inland, and borders Anseba to the north-west, the Northern Red Sea region to the north-east, the Southern region to the south, and Gash-Barka to the west. Much of the architecture in the region reflects Italian colonial influences. The topography of the region has highland plateau, which are cooler than the regions around the coastal plains. There are two rainy seasons, the heavier one during summer and the lighter one during spring. The climate and geography of the region along with other regions of Eritrea is similar to the one of Ethiopia. The average elevation in the region is around 1,800 m (5,900 ft) to 2,100 m (6,900 ft). The hottest month is May recording temperatures up to 30 °C (86 °F), while the coldest month is December to February when it reaches freezing temperature. The region received around 508 mm (20.0 in) of rainfall and the soil is conducive for agriculture.

== Demographics ==
As of 2002, the Total Fertility Rate (TFR), defined as the children per woman was 3.4. The General Fertility Rate (GFR), defined as the births per 1,000 women between the ages of 15 and 45 remained at 109.0. The Crude Birth Rate (CBR), the number of births per 1,000 population, was 27.0. The percentage of women pregnant as of 2002 out of the total population was 7.1 per cent. The mean number of children ever born stood at 4.8. The Infant Mortality Rate (IMR), defined as the number of deaths of children for every 1,000 born was 39.0 while the Child Mortality Rate (CMR), defined as the number of child deaths for every 1,000 children 5 years of age was 22.0. The under-5 mortality rate stood at 60.0. The number of children with the prevalence of Acute Respiratory Infection (ARI) was 1,069, fever was 1,069, and Diarrhea was 1,069. The number of women with the knowledge of AIDS was 2,264 and the number of people with no knowledge of the disease or its prevention was 0.2 per cent. As of 2005, the region had a population of 675,700 compared to a population of 595,900 in 2001. The net growth rate was 11.81 per cent. The total area of the province was 1,300.00 km^{2} and the density was 519.77 persons per km^{2}.

== Education and economy ==
As of 2002, the number of males completing or attending highest level of schooling in the region was 3,186 while it was 4,506 females. The per centage of literate males was 85.00 and the percentage of literate females was 72.00. A fraction of 13.80 males had no education, while the corresponding number for females was 23.90. The fraction of males completing secondary school stood at 9.60 and the fraction of males completing more than secondary was 009. The corresponding numbers for females was 9.30 and 003 respectively.

As of 2002, the number of people engaged in Professional/technical/managerial activities was 16.40 per cent, Clerical was 12.80 per cent, Sales and services was 27.30 per cent, Skilled Manual was 15.10 per cent, Unskilled Manual was 0.60 per cent, Domestic Service was 22.30 per cent and Agriculture was 4.60 per cent. The total number of employed men was 2,810 and the total number of employed women was 3,202. The number of men who were paid their total earnings in cash was 80.40 per cent, in kind was 0.90 and in both was 0.40. The number of women who were paid their total earnings in cash was 89.00 per cent, in kind was 1.20 per cent and in both was 0.30 per cent.

== Administration ==
The region is divided into subregions:

- Berikh,
- Ghala Nefhi,
- North Eastern,
- North Western,
- Serejaka,
- South Eastern and
- South Western,

while Asmara forms a separate administrative area. Other settlements within the Central Region include Himberti, Emba Derho and Tsazega. The region's administrator is Major General Ramadan Osman Awliyai. Eritrea has a one party national Assembly governed by People's Front for Democracy and Justice (PFDJ) (originally Eritrean Liberation Front), an authoritarian government. From the time of independence since 30 May 1991, the country has been continuing with a transitional government elected during the elections in April 1993. The scheduled elections in 2001 has been postponed indefinitely. The regional and local elections are conducted on a periodic basis on a restricted framework. All men and women of any ethnic or religious background are eligible to vote. No parties or groups other than PFDJ are allowed to contest and the elections are presided by representatives from PDFJ. Policy decisions should be centered around the party mandate and opposition and dissenters have been imprisoned.
