= Tsazega =

Tseazega (Tigrinya: ጸዓዘጋ) is a village in Central Eritrea located in the former province of Hamasien. It is 5.6 miles (9 km) north-west from the capital city, Asmara. It is an entirely Christian village inhabited by the Tigrinya speaking people of Eritrea. The village is twinned with its smaller counterpart, Hazega.

It was the capital of Hamasien from the beginning of the 18th century to the 1870s. The rulers of Tseazega were able to control the whole of Hamasien in the first half of the 18th century. Its significance declined after the rise of Ras Mikael Sehul of Tigray. Ras Mikael defeated Tseazega and placed their rivalry Hazega in power which started more than 120 years of bitter feud.

== Notable people ==
- Aman Andom – former head of state of Ethiopia
