= Egyptian–Ethiopian War =

1874–1876 war between the Ethiopian Empire and Khedivate of Egypt

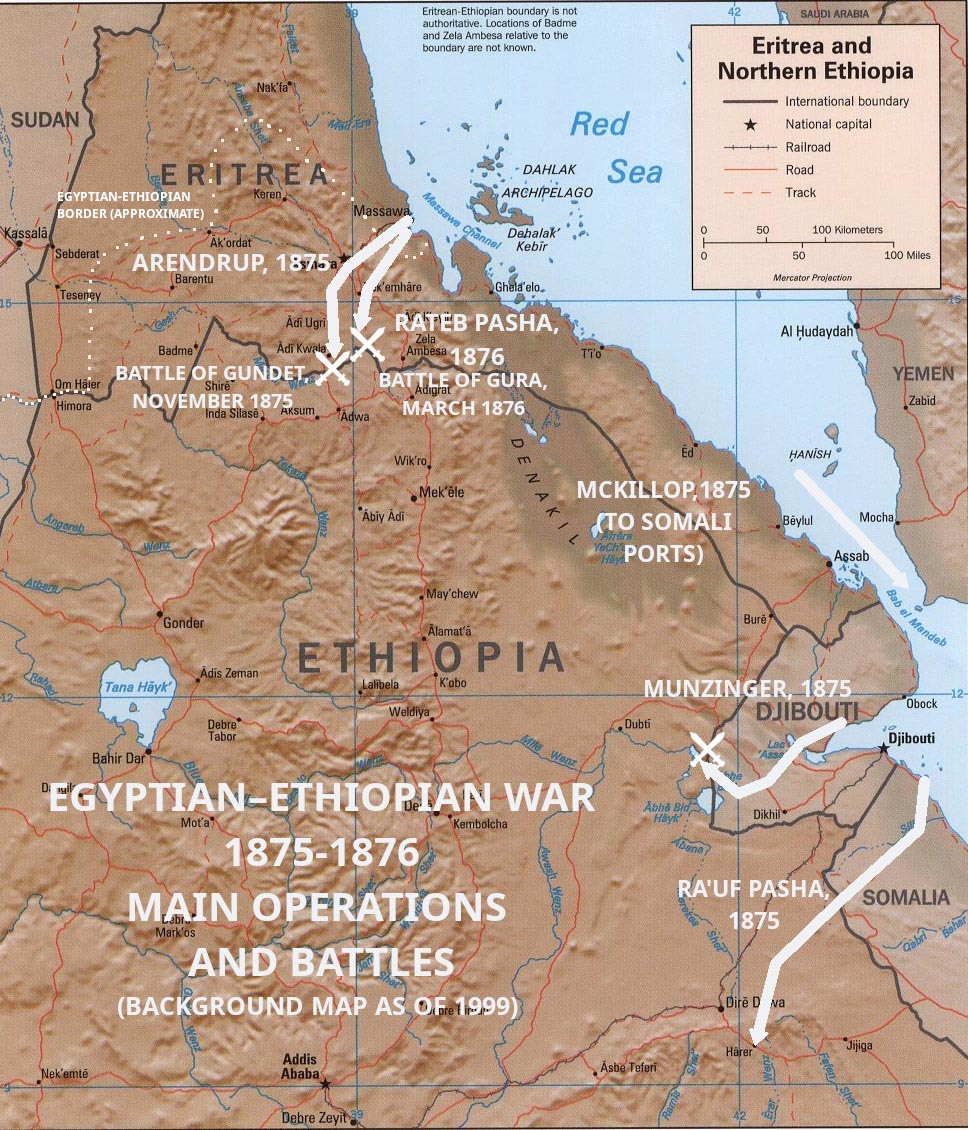
- Main operations of Egyptian-Ethiopian War
Date	December 1874 – 9 March 1876 (1 year and 3 months)
Location	Mereb Melash, Ethiopia
Result	Ethiopian victory; Treaty of Hewett

Belligerents
Khedivate of Egypt	Ethiopian Empire

Commanders and leaders
Isma'il I Hassan Pasha; Werner Munzinger †; Ahmed Urabi; Adolph Arendrup †; William Loring	Yohannes IV; Alula Engida; Woldemikael Solomon (surrendered); Abuna II (DOW)

Strength
13,000–20,000	50,000–60,000

Casualties and losses
8,500 killed 1,000 wounded 2,300 captured	4,550 killed 2,000 wounded

The Egyptian–Ethiopian War was a war between the Ethiopian Empire and the Khedivate of Egypt, a tributary state of the Ottoman Empire, from 1874 to 1876. The conflict resulted in victory for Ethiopia and a treaty that guaranteed the country's continued independence in the years immediately preceding the Scramble for Africa. Conversely, for Khedivate Egypt, the war was a costly failure that laid the foundations for the beginning of the British Empire's 'veiled protectorate' over Egypt less than a decade later.

== Background ==
Whilst nominally a vassal state of the Ottoman Empire, Egypt had acted as a somewhat independent state since Muhammad Ali's seizure of power in 1805, though still a vassal state of the Ottomans. With Egypt's actions often representing Muhammed Ali dynasty/family interests rather than Egyptian national will or interests. They eventually established an expansion from Egypt to its south in Sudan. Multiple times throughout the early 19th century, Ottoman Egypt attempted to assert their control over the region around the modern Ethiopian-Sudanese border, putting them into conflict with the regional rulers of Ethiopia's western Begemder province, such as at Wadkaltabu, Gallabat, and Dabarki. Muhammad Ali's grandson, Isma'il Pasha, became Khedive in 1863, and sought to expand this burgeoning empire further southwards. After annexing Darfur in 1875, he turned his attention to Ethiopia. It was Isma'il's intention that Egypt forge a contiguous African empire that would both rival the empires of Europe, and allow Egypt to escape the territorial ambitions of those same European great powers. The rapid modernization of Egypt under Muhammad Ali, and Isma'il's own enormous modernizing projects, convinced the Khedive that war with Ethiopia would result in certain Egyptian victory. Amongst Egypt's army were many European and American officers, whose training and experience further strengthened Isma'il's confidence. Meanwhile, King Yohannes IV became the King of kings of Ethiopia in 1872 after defeating Tekle Giyorgis II in battle. He worked on modernizing his army, some of whom were trained by the British adventurer John Kirkham.

== Battle of Gundet ==
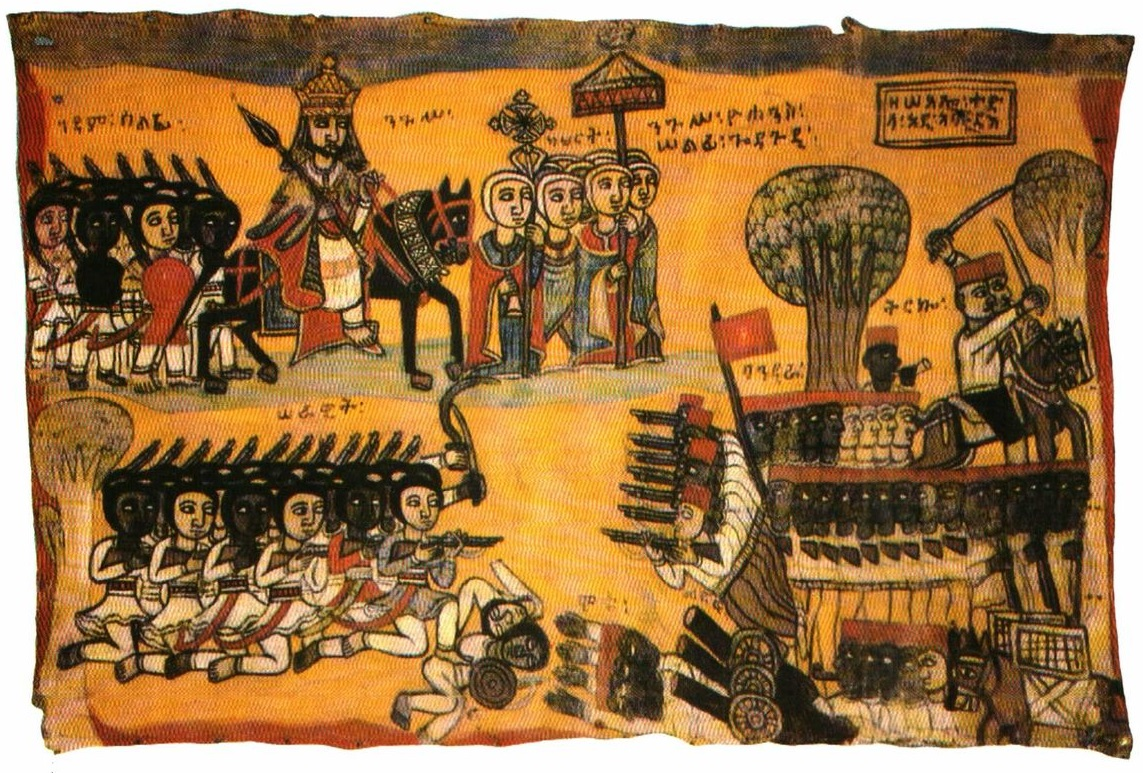
Ethiopian painting of the battle of Gundet, c. 1880

The Egyptians under Arakil Bey and Danish Colonel Adolph Arendrup invaded from their coastal possessions in Massawa, in what is now Eritrea. Following some skirmishes, the armies of Yohannes and Isma'il met at Gundet on the morning of 16 November 1875. Not only were the Egyptians vastly outnumbered, they were also taken completely by surprise as they were marching through a narrow mountain pass. The mass of Ethiopian warriors sallied forth from their hiding places up the slope and swiftly charged down upon the shocked Egyptian columns, nullifying the latter's advantage in firepower and causing many of the unenthusiastic fellahin soldiers to rout. This encounter ended in the complete annihilation of the Egyptian expeditionary force led by Colonel Arendrup and in the death of its commander.

Arendrup's expedition was hopelessly inadequate for the tasks he set out to do. It amounted to scarcely more than some 4,000 troops and had no cavalry. Its leaders were, apart from the already mentioned Danish artilleryman and Major Dennison, an American, Major Durholtz, a Swiss, later of the Papal army, and Major Rushdi Bey, a Turk Arakal Bey, the young nephew of Nubar Pasha (the Christian Armenian Premier of the Khedive) who joined the expedition and was killed in battle.

About 2,000 Egyptians perished with him and his two six gun batteries and six rocket-stands fell into the hands of the enemy.

The Egyptians withdrew to Massawa on the coast and then to Keren, garrisoned since 1872 by some 1,200 Egyptians. But Isma'il Pasha could not leave the matter there, it was absolutely essential to regain the lost prestige. At all costs, his European creditors had to be impressed, and he set out on mobilizing a larger force for a second expedition that would make amends for the devastating and humiliating loss he had suffered at the hands of the Ethiopians at Gundet.

== The Battle of Gura ==
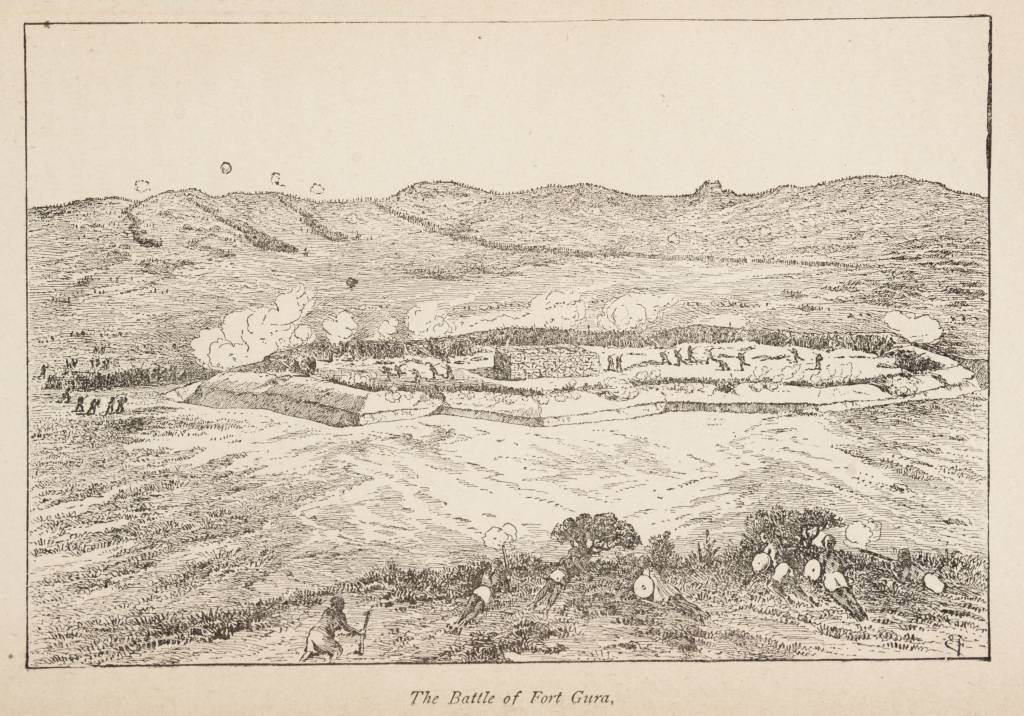
Fort in Gura

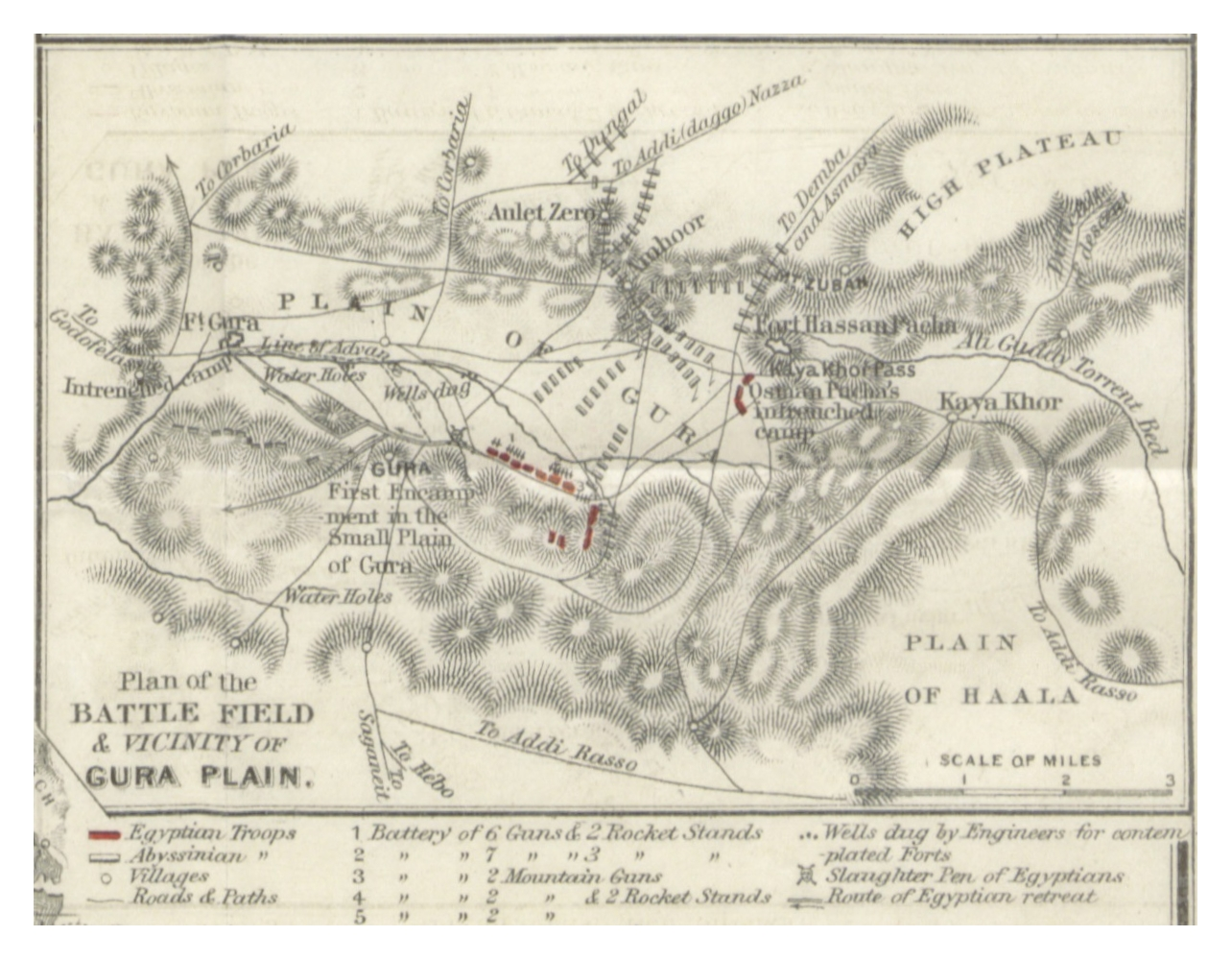
The battlefield of Gura

Following the unsuccessful invasion, the khedivate army again attempted another invasion, this time with an army of about 13,000 men. The forces of Isma'il Pasha, now under Ratib Pasha, arrived at Massawa on 14 December 1875. By March, they had reached the plain of Gura and set up two forts, one in the Plains of Gura and the other at the Khaya Khor mountain pass a few kilometers away. Yohannes had once again mobilized, this time presenting the issue as a struggle between Christianity and Islam, thousands of men answered with soldiers coming as far as Gojjam, although Menelik’s soldiers in Shewa remained as observers. The Ethiopians, now with a force of some 50,000 (of whom only about 15,000 could fight at one time due to battlefield layout), engaged them on the 7 March 1875, and Ratib Pasha ordered just over 5,000 out of 7,500 men stationed at Fort Gura to leave the fort and engage the Ethiopians. This force was quickly surrounded by the Ethiopian advance guard, probably commanded by Ras Alula, and quickly broke. The Ethiopians then fell back, and, on 10 March, mounted a secondary attack on Fort Gura, which was repelled. The Ethiopian force dissolved the next day, and the khedivate army soon withdrew.

== Foreign service ==
=== Europe ===
Several European officers served on both sides of the conflict at various capacities; these include a British adventurer John Kirkham on the Ethiopian side, and the Dane Adolph Arendrup as well as Swiss explorer Werner Munzinger on the Egyptian side. Munzinger, former governor of the Keren and Massawa regions, led one of the Egyptian attacks against Ethiopia, marching inland from Tadjoura, but his troops were overwhelmed by the army of Muhammad ibn Hanfadhe, Sultan of Aussa, and he was killed in battle. Meanwhile, Arendrup, who was Isma'il's aide-de-camp was given the task of leading an expedition against the Abyssinians. In mid-November during clashes at Gundet, Arendrup, several other officers and about 1,000 privates died during a 12-hour battle. Only three men escaped alive.

=== United States ===
Several ex-Confederate officers and Union officers who had both previously fought in the American Civil War participated in the conflict. The Egyptian Khedive was introduced to the idea of hiring American officers to reorganize his army when he met Thaddeus P. Mott, an ex-Union artillery officer and adventurer, in the sultan’s court in Constantinople in 1868. Mott so regaled Ismail with testimonies about the advances the Americans had achieved in technology and tactics during the US Civil War that he convinced the Khedive to hire American veterans to oversee the modernization of Egypt’s armed forces. In 1870, the first of these military overseers, ex-Confederate officers Henry Hopkins Sibley and William Wing Loring, arrived in Egypt. Loring was appointed by the Khedive as Inspector-General of the Egyptian army, and in 1875 was promoted to chief of staff to the commander-in-chief of the Egyptian military expedition in Ethiopia. Loring would take part in the Battle of Gura which ended in defeat. The Egyptians blamed the Americans for the disastrous war, and the Loring, Sibley, and the other officers had to endure two years of endless frustration and humiliation in Cairo.

== Aftermath ==
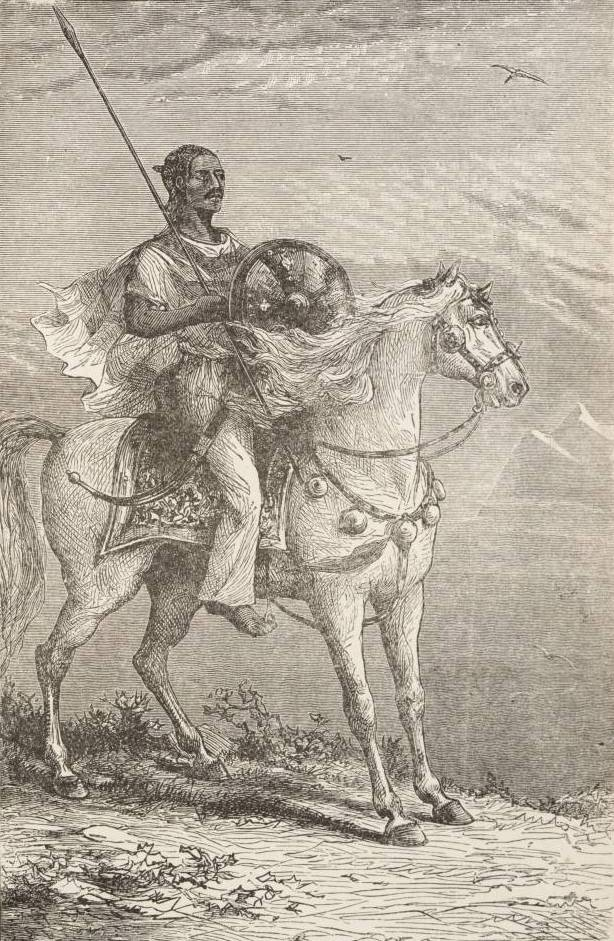
Emperor Yohannes IV, 1884

Following the war, Ethiopia and Egypt remained in a state of tension, which largely abated after the 1884 Hewett Treaty.

Ras Alula had shown himself to be a reliable general, and was promoted by Yohannes IV to the rank of Ras, and appointed governor of the Mareb Malash.

The Egyptian defeat in the war had serious ramifications for Egypt. The war's costs added to the nation's massive financial debts, which, in 1879, were the cause of Isma'il's removal as Khedive at the insistence of Britain, and France.

At the same time, many Egyptian soldiers who had served in the war became politicized by their experiences, posing a threat to the Egyptian monarchy itself. Among these disgruntled army officers was Colonel Ahmed Orabi, who is said to have been "incensed at the way in which [the war] had been mismanaged". Resentment over the defeat contributed to the general dissatisfaction with Tewfik Pasha, whom the Great Powers selected as Isma'il's successor, provoking the Orabi Revolt against the monarchy. The initial success of the revolt was met with alarm in Europe, and led ultimately to the United Kingdom dispatching its forces to occupy Egypt in support of Tewfik, thereby beginning the United Kingdom's occupation of Egypt.

The result of the war had a defining impact on the trajectories of both African states. Prior to the conflict, Egypt had been in regional and, relative, international ascendancy, with aspirations of achieving geopolitical parity with the Great Powers of Europe. The defeat shattered these aspirations, and, combined with a disastrous economic situation in Egypt itself, contributed to the eventual deposition of Isma'il and subjugation of Egypt by the Great Powers, thereby leading to the very outcome which Isma'il's hopes for a pan-Nile Valley empire were meant to avoid.

Conversely, Ethiopia maintained its independence, and, hardened by war, was well prepared for its own defense during the imminent Scramble for Africa. The collapse of Egypt's African empire was seized upon by European empires, of whom Italy replaced Egypt in Eritrea, setting the stage for an eventual confrontation between Italy and Ethiopia in the First Italo-Ethiopian War 1895. Ethiopia's triumph in that war would in turn contribute to Fascist Italy's desire to conquer Ethiopia in the 1930s.

== See also ==
- British Expedition to Abyssinia
- First Italo-Ethiopian War
- Battle of Adwa
- Second Italo-Ethiopian War
- Military history of Ethiopia
- Battle of Gura
