= Naýib Al-Bahr =

Egyptian administrative title modelled on the Ethiopian Bahr Negash

Naýib al-Bahr (Arabic: نائب البحر, meaning Deputy of the Sea) was an administrative title created by the Khedivate of Egypt in 1866 for their deputy governing the Sämhar plains of the Red Sea coast, deliberately modelled on the ancient Ethiopian title of Bahr Negash (Bahér nägaš, also meaning "Ruler of the Sea").

== Origins ==
When Egypt under Khedive Ismail took control of Massawa from the Ottomans in 1865–66 and began building an ambitious Red Sea province, it needed a title for its local representative in the Sämhar plains. The title chosen, naýib al-bahr, was deliberately styled after the prestigious Ethiopian title of Bahr Negash, which had governed the Eritrean highlands as part of the Ethiopian Empire since at least the Zagwe period and whose roots the Encyclopaedia Aethiopica traces to the Aksumite period.

The Encyclopaedia Aethiopica states that the Egyptian adoption of the title reflected an acknowledgement of the old glory and historical legitimacy of the Ethiopian institution. By naming their own deputy after the Bahr Negash, Egypt was implicitly recognising the deep-rooted Ethiopian claim to sovereignty over the Red Sea coastal region.

== The Ethiopian Bahr Negash ==
The Bahr Negash (literally "Ruler/King of the Sea") was one of the most important offices in the Ethiopian Empire, with origins traceable to the Aksumite period. A ruler called the šum bahri (also íéyyumä bahér) controlled trade routes between Massawa and the Christian highlands, and may originally have been a prefect appointed by the Aksumites. The title persisted through the Zagwe dynasty and the Solomonic dynasty, governing the Eritrean highlands of Hamasien, Seraye and Akele Guzai.

By the time Egypt created the naýib al-bahr title, the Bahr Negash office had multiplied into several simultaneous holders across Hamasen, Säraʿé and Akkälä Guzay, and James Bruce had described it as formerly the most important office in the kingdom. Its prestige, however, remained strong enough that Egypt chose to invoke it directly.

== Egyptian expansion along the Red Sea ==
Egyptian expansion under governor Munzinger Pasha was rapid in the early 1870s. In 1872, the Bogos region and Keren were occupied. The Afar began paying tribute. This expansion came to a halt in 1876 when the Egyptian–Ethiopian War ended in decisive Ethiopian victories at Gundet (1875) and Guraʿ (1876) under Emperor Yohannes IV.

== Legacy ==
The naýib al-bahr title did not survive Egyptian withdrawal from the area after 1885, when Italy occupied Massawa and eventually proclaimed the Colony of Eritrea on 1 January 1890. Its creation is nonetheless cited by scholars as evidence that Egypt implicitly recognised the historical legitimacy of Ethiopian sovereignty over the Red Sea coastal region, an acknowledgement made more significant by the fact that it came from a rival power actively attempting to displace Ethiopian influence in the area.

== See also ==
- Nayeb dynasty of Hergigo
- Bahr Negash
- Medri Bahri
- Massawa
- Egyptian–Ethiopian War
- Colony of Eritrea

== Sources ==
- Uhlig, Siegbert (2003). Encyclopaedia Aethiopica: Volume 1: A-C. Harrassowitz Verlag. pp. 444–445.
- Smidt, Wolbert (2012). "History, Historical Arguments and the Ethio-Eritrean conflict: between xenophobic approaches and an ideology of unity". Stichproben. 12 (22): 109–112.
