= Abuna Petros VII =

Head (abuna) of the Ethiopian Orthodox Tewahedo Church from 1881 to 1889

- Abuna of Ethiopia
- Church: Ethiopian Orthodox Tewahedo Church
- In office: 1881–1889
- Predecessor: Atnatewos II
- Successor: Mattheos X

Orders
- Consecration: January 1881 by Pope Cyril V of Alexandria

Personal details
- Died: 20 October 1917
- Denomination: Oriental Orthodoxy

Abuna Petros VII (died 20 October 1917) was a cleric of the Ethiopian Orthodox Tewahedo Church who served as Abuna of Ethiopia (archbishop and head of the Church) from 1881 to 1889. He served during the reign of Emperor Yohannes IV (r. 1871–1889), a period during which the Ethiopian Church maintained traditional ecclesiastical ties with the Coptic Orthodox Church of Alexandria and sought to strengthen episcopal leadership following years of instability.

== Background and appointment ==
During the 19th century, the head of the Ethiopian Orthodox Tewahedo Church was traditionally appointed by the Pope of the Coptic Orthodox Church of Alexandria following a request and payment from the Ethiopian imperial court. During Emperor Yohannes IV's rule, Ethiopia sought renewed episcopal leadership after the death of Abuna Atnatewos II in 1876 (who died of wounds received at the Battle of Gura). Because of political and military tensions between the Ethiopian Empire and the Khedivate of Egypt, replacing the deceased abuna was delayed for several years.

In January 1881, Yohannes IV dispatched a delegation of ecclesiastical leaders to the Coptic Pope Cyril V of Alexandria, together with a substantial payment (12,000 Maria Theresa thalers), to request the consecration of multiple bishops for the Ethiopian Church. Cyril V consecrated and sent to Ethiopia the four monks from El-Muharraq Monastery: Abuna Petros (who assumed the metropolitan position and leadership of the Ethiopian Church), Abuna Marqos, Abuna Matewos and Abuna Luqas.

== Tenure as Abuna ==
Abuna Petros VII's tenure (1881–1889) coincided almost exactly with the reign of Yohannes IV. During this period, the Ethiopian Church maintained its traditional ties to the Coptic Orthodox Church, while Ethiopia navigated both internal consolidation and external pressures. The presence of Abuna Petros was part of Yohannes IV's broader efforts to strengthen ecclesiastical structures and continuity following years of episcopal vacancies.

== Succession ==
Abuna Petros VII's leadership of the Ethiopian Church ended in 1889, the same year Yohannes IV died at the Battle of Gallabat and Menelik II rose to imperial power. Following his tenure, the next abuna appointed was Abuna Mattheos X, who succeeded Abuna Petros and later played a significant role as church leader into the early 20th century.

Oriental Orthodox titles
Preceded by Atnatewos II	Abuna of Ethiopia; 1881–1889	Succeeded by Mattheos X
