= Kirkham (surname) =

Kirkham is a surname. Notable people with the surname include:

- Charles B. Kirkham, American pioneer aero engine and plane builder
- Don Kirkham, American soil scientist
- Don Kirkham (cyclist), Australian cyclist
- Frances Kirkham, British judge
- Fred Kirkham (1937–2007), Australian rower, songwriter and judge
- Fred Kirkham (football manager) (died 1949), English football referee and manager of Tottenham Hotspur
- Glenn Kirkham, English hockey player
- Ian Kirkham (born 1963), English saxophonist
- Jayne Kirkham, British politician
- John Kirkham (disambiguation), several people, including

- John Kirkham (adventurer) (c. 1830–1876), British adventurer in Ethiopia

- Jon Kirkham (born 1984), British motorcycle racer
- Kathleen Kirkham (1895–1961), silent film actress
- Millie Kirkham, American backing singer
- Oscar A. Kirkham (1880–1958), leading figure in The Church of Jesus Christ of Latter-day Saints
- Paul Kirkham (born 1969), English footballer
- Peter Kirkham, English footballer
- Reg Kirkham (1919–1999), English footballer
- Richard Kirkham (born 1955), American philosopher
- Rick Kirkham, American journalist
- Stanton Davis Kirkham (1868–1944), American naturalist, philosopher, ornithologist and author
- Tom Kirkham, English football referee
- Tommy Kirkham, Northern Ireland loyalist politician
- Tony Kirkham (born 1957), English botanist
- Wilf Kirkham (1901–1974), English footballer
