= Mattheos =

Mattheos may refer to:

- Abuna Mattheos X (1843–1926), Ethiopian priest
- Mattheos Maroukakis (born 1990), Greek football player
