= Ethiopia in World War I =

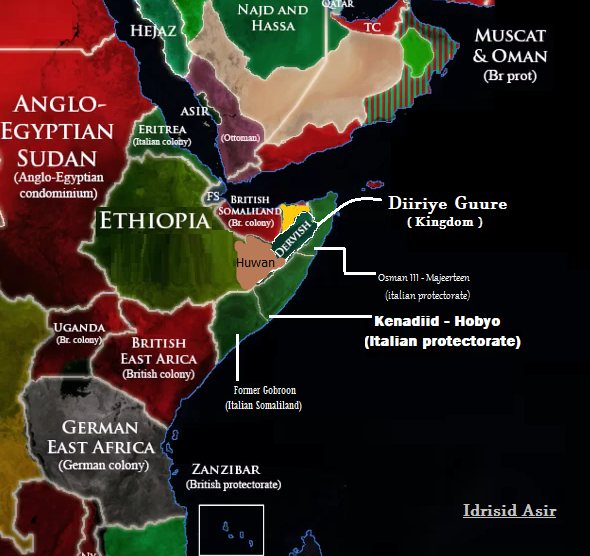
Ethiopia in 1915, with the disputed Huwan region (coral color)

During World War I, Ethiopia briefly forged an alliance with the Allied Powers, following Italy's entry into the war in 1915. In June 1916, a dynastic conflict emerged when the uncrowned Emperor, Lij Iyasu, was alleged to have converted to Islam under the influence of the Ottoman Empire, which led him to be charged with apostasy. As a result, then-regent Ras Tafari Mekonnen, later known as Emperor Haile Selassie, orchestrated a coup d'état in September, deposing Lij Iyasu and installing Empress Zewditu on the throne. Throughout the war, Empress Zewditu maintained a stance of neutrality.

In May 1918, the Allies commended Ethiopia's diplomatic missions to Rome, Paris, and London. While Britain and Italy voiced strong opposition, France extended support for Ethiopia's sovereignty and its admission to the League of Nations. In 1923, Ethiopia joined the League of Nations.

== Background ==
Since the Middle Ages, Ethiopia, a predominantly Christian nation, maintained significant diplomatic ties with various European monarchies, frequently exchanging embassies with Portugal, the Vatican, and Russia. In 1841, following British presence in Aden, the first Anglo-Ethiopian agreement was signed. During the late 19th century, Ethiopia was recognised under international law by European powers as a member of the "family of nations", setting it apart from other African countries.

In 1884, Negus Menelik II signed the Hewett Treaty with Britain, granting Ethiopia access to the British sphere of influence on the Nile. Additionally, in 1889, Menelik II signed a treaty with Italy after Italy's takeover of Eritrea, aiming to foster positive relations between the two nations. Historians have highlighted this rapprochement "as Ethiopia's success... [having] actively participated as the only African state in the partitioning of the continent". Menelik II considered himself equal to his European counterparts, referring to them as his "brothers".

Menelik later disagreed over the interpretation of the Italian word for "protectorate" in the Treaty of Wuchale, leading to the Battle of Adwa in 1896. Following Ethiopia's victorious defense against Italy and the re-establishment of its sovereignty, Menelik II embarked on a mission to compete with neighbouring European powers—Britain, Italy, and France—both to benefit Ethiopia and to reaffirm imperial power. This endeavour involved implementing ministries in 1905 and 1906. As a result, eight major powers—Great Britain, France, Italy, Russia, the United States, Germany, and the Ottoman Empire—established legations in Addis Ababa and enhanced their consular jurisdiction over Ethiopia. Consequently, Ethiopia became an active participant in the shaping of international politics, as perceived in the Western world. In 1907, Ethiopia initiated diplomatic missions to Budapest, Vienna, and Berlin.

In 1906, Sir Harrington, the British Minister to Addis Ababa, proposed a memorandum to Menelik, suggesting the dispatch of a European legal advisor to Ethiopia. Many historians view this proposal as an attempt to establish "semi-colonial" relations or exert "semi-colonial control" over Ethiopia. By 1905, Ethiopia had achieved a significant level of equality with the international community through diplomatic accomplishments, such as the establishment of legations and the signing of numerous international conventions.

== During the war ==
Map of colonial divisions of Africa, circa 1913

After the death of Emperor Menelik II in 1913, the uncrowned Emperor Lij Iyasu assumed power in Addis Ababa, despite facing political opposition due to his views on European influence and alternative power structures. At the onset of World War I, French and British representatives sought the support of the Ethiopian crown prince as a counter against their German counterparts. Rumours circulated that Ethiopia might intentionally join the war, potentially gaining access to the Red Sea via Italian Eritrea. Because of diplomatic ties to the Central Powers since 1882, by virtue of the Triple Alliance, Ethiopia would attack Eritrea as the Italians feared.

During previous conflicts in Europe, Ethiopian elites employed a multilateral approach. However, Ethiopia maintained its neutrality in this war, though foreign representatives and the Ethiopian government experienced a number of disputes regarding this stance. The Ethiopian government adhered to the principles outlined in the Hague Convention of 1907, which governed the rights and obligations of neutral powers and individuals during land warfare. In August 1914, representatives of the Allied powers pressured the Ethiopian government to restrict the usage of communication facilities, and the railway to French Djibouti, for citizens of the Central Powers residing in Ethiopia.

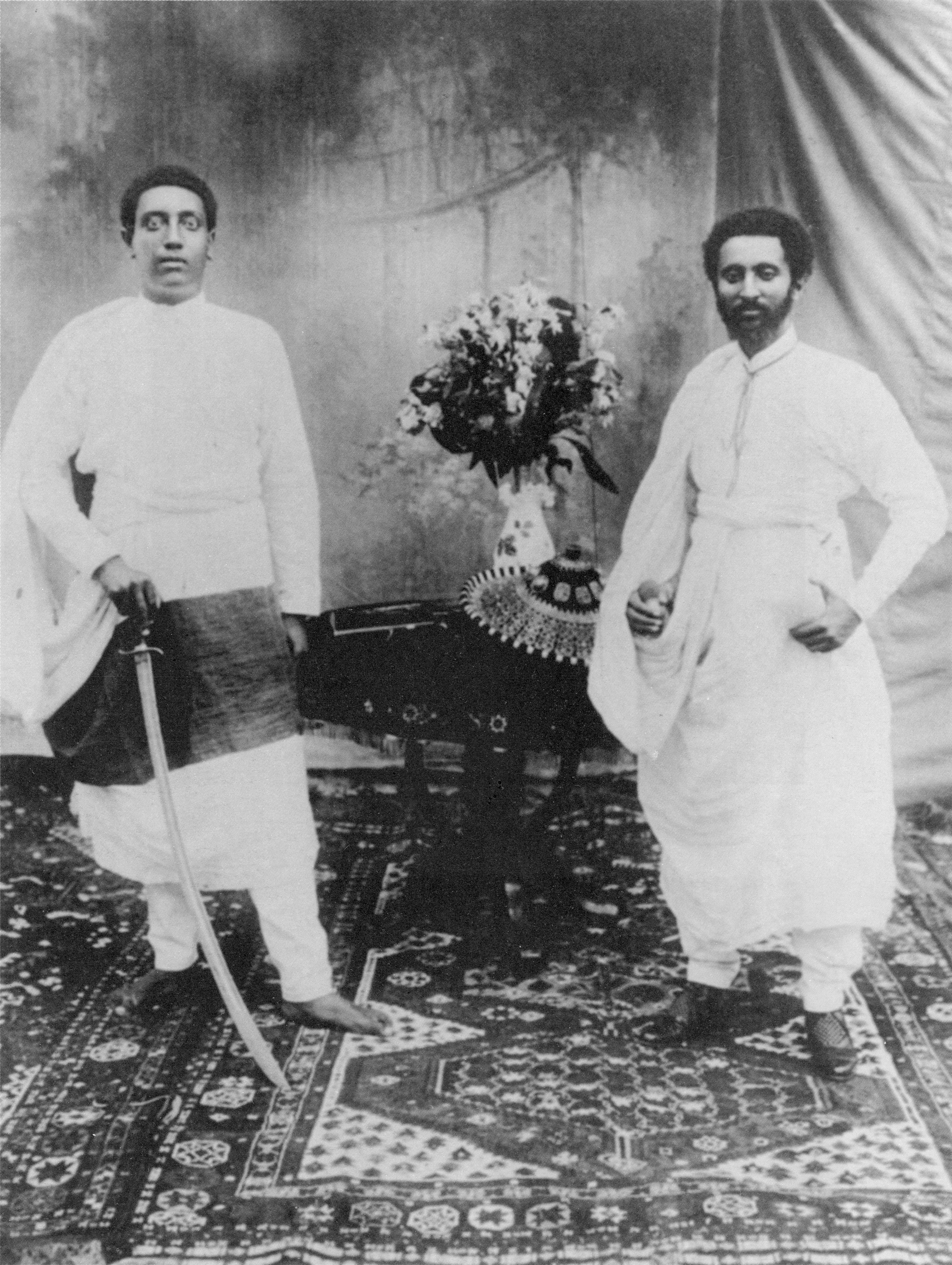
Lij Iyasu (left) with Dejazemach Tafari Mekonnen (later Emperor Haile Selassie (right) circa 1916. Lij Iyasu was deposed after he was accused of being in league with the Central Powers because he allegedly had converted to Islam.

When Italy joined the Allied Powers in April 1915, Ethiopia found itself surrounded by countries involved in the conflict against Germany and its allies, including the Ottoman Empire and its Yemeni colony along the Red Sea. During 1915 and 1916, Ethiopia appeared noticeably sympathetic towards the Central Powers. The Central Powers, in coordination with Turkish support, aimed to open a new front against the British in Sudan, Somalia, and Libya. Ethiopia played an important role in this strategy by supplying weapons to the Sanussi and Mohammed Abdullah Hassan. As part of their plan to attack the Suez Canal, the Central Powers promised Ethiopia control over the trading post at sea. Furthermore, the Germans hoped to alleviate the pressure caused by attacks from Paul von Lettow-Vorbeck's troops in German East Africa.

The Allies were aware of the German and Turkish intention to exploit pan-Islamist rhetoric and propaganda in the Arab world. In June 1916, the Turkish Consul, Ahmed Mazher bey, distributed leaflets in Addis Ababa, stating that "[t]he interests of Islam in this country concur with those of the Abyssinian Government". There were rumors and concerns about the crown prince converting or having already converted to Islam. Lij Iyasu's amicable relationship with the Turkish consul and Muslim leaders in Harar and Somalia heightened fears in the British and French legations. Despite the Ethiopian Minister of War having officially declared Ethiopia a neutral country, Lij Iyasu appeared to favor a Central Powers' victory. The British continued their efforts to sway neutral parties towards the Allied Powers by providing troops and utilising Lij Iyasu's cousin, Ras Tafari Mekonnen (later Emperor Haile Selassie), as a mediator. Ras Tefari Mekonnen, who was a rival of Lij Iyasu, successfully carried out a coup d'état on September 26, 1916. The coup was supported by the Allied Powers, who claimed that Lij Iyasu had converted to Islam, although there was no concrete evidence of his apostasy or formal conversion.

As the Allies gained control of the region in 1916, Ras Tafari Mekonnen became aware of Lij Iyasu's alliance with Ottoman Turkey. Lij Iyasu was promptly arrested but managed to briefly escape from prison before being recaptured and returned to custody. When Empress Zewditu assumed the throne in 1916, Ethiopia adopted a policy of neutrality during the war, and the government prohibited Ethiopian troops from participating alongside the Allies in accordance with the Hague Convention of 1907.

During this period, Ethiopian farmers began selling cattle to meat factories in Eritrea, which were then transported to Italian forces there. In May 1917, the German party from the legation in Addis Ababa attempted to cross the Red Sea to establish communication with the Turkish Army. The French legate subsequently accused the Ethiopian government and subsequent German captives in Djibouti of flagrant violations of neutrality.

In June 1917, under pressure from Ras Tafari Mekonnen, Ethiopia terminated its diplomatic relations with the Central Powers but requested 16,000 modern rifles. The Italians persuaded their allies of the importance of maintaining friendly relations with neutral Ethiopia but were cautious about making claims regarding its sovereignty during peace negotiations. Consequently, Ethiopia's offer was declined. By late 1918, the Ethiopian government congratulated the Allies on their victory, but the German legate's presence in Ethiopia persisted.

In May 1918, the Allies commended the Ethiopian mission in Rome, Paris, and London. While France favored Ethiopia's inclusion in the League of Nations, Italy and Britain reluctantly opposed granting Ethiopian statehood. Finally, in 1923, Ethiopia was admitted to the League of Nations, becoming the only independent African nation to achieve this status. The country continued to conduct robust diplomatic missions to safeguard its independence.
