= Alexander Macomb Mason =

American-born officer who served in the Egyptian Army

- Mason Bey
- Born: 9 November 1841; Washington, D.C., United States
- Died: 17 March 1897 (aged 55); Washington, D.C., United States
- Burial place: Oak Hill Cemetery, Washington, D.C.
- Education: United States Naval Academy (3 years)
- Occupations: Naval officer; mercenary; explorer; diplomat
- Known for: Exploration in northeastern Africa; mapping Lake Albert and Semliki River; gubernatorial role in Massawa; signing 1884 Hewett Treaty
- Notable work: Survey of Lake Albert (1877); maps of Darfur and surrounding regions
- Parent(s): John Henry Mason Jr. (father); Catherine Macomb (mother)

Alexander Macomb Mason (1841–1897), also known as Mason Bey, was an American naval officer, mercenary, explorer and diplomat. He was the grandson of General Alexander Macomb and great-grandson of George Mason. Born in Washington, DC, to a family with many professional officers in the United States Army and United States Navy, Mason served as a teenager aboard the frigate USS Niagara when that ship laid the first successful transatlantic cable in 1858. Mason then studied for three years at the United States Naval Academy before resigning in April 1861 to join the Confederate States Navy during the American Civil War. His wartime career included participation in the Battle of Hampton Roads, the Battle of Drewy's Bluff, and the blockade of Charleston. During 1863 and 1864 he traveled in England and France, serving briefly as private secretary to his uncle James Murray Mason. Captured at the Battle of Sailor's Creek in April 1865, Mason was imprisoned first at the Old Capitol Prison in Washington, DC and then at Johnson's Island near Sandusky, Ohio.

After the war, Mason became a mercenary, aiding Chile and Peru during the Chincha Islands War and then briefly joining the Cuban rebellion against Spain in the Ten Years' War. In 1870, along with several other Union and Confederate veterans, he joined the General Staff of the Khedivate of Egypt and conducted explorations in Egypt, Nubia, Darfur and Equatoria. In 1877 he charted Lake Albert and discovered the Semliki River. During the 1870s he traveled extensively with Charles George Gordon and served as Gordon's deputy and chief of staff during Gordon's anti-slavery campaigns. In the 1880s Mason became governor of Massawa prior to the Italian occupation of that town in 1885. Henry Morton Stanley praised the quality of Mason's map of Lake Albert during the Emin Pasha Relief Expedition. Mason represented Egypt in meetings with King Yohannes IV of Abyssinia and was a signatory to the 1884 Hewett Treaty which would eventually lead to the First Italo-Ethiopian War and the famous Battle of Adowa.

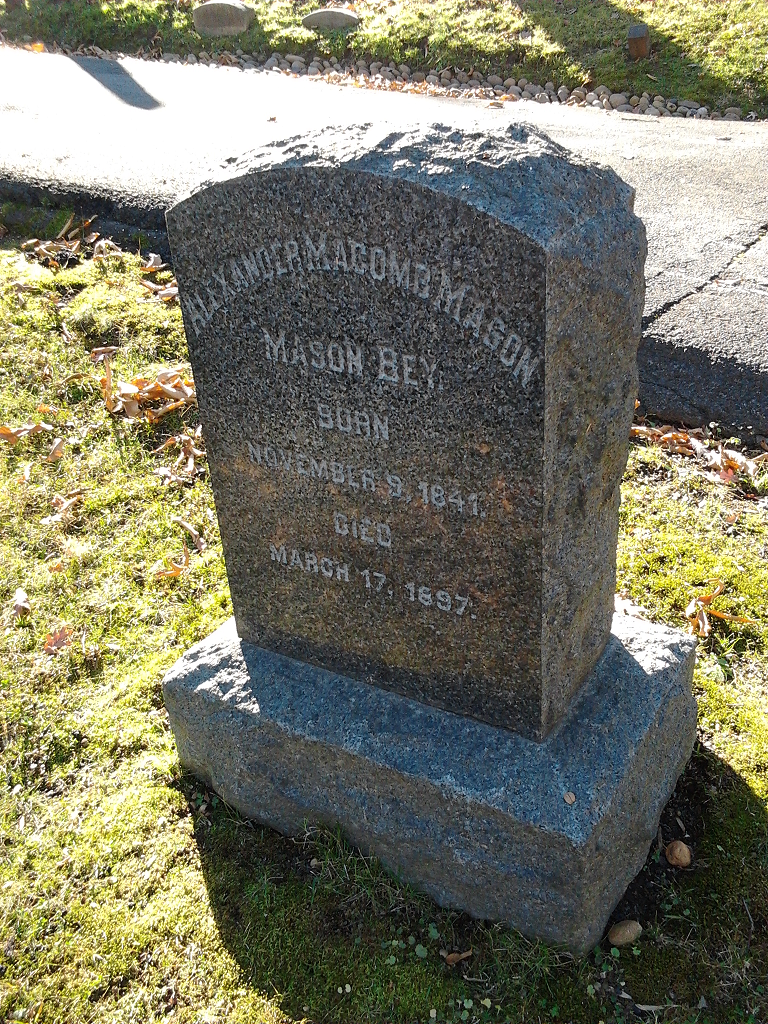
Grave marker of Alexander Macomb Mason in Oak Hill Cemetery, Washington, DC

Mason died in Washington, DC in 1897 and is buried in Oak Hill Cemetery.
