= Tripartite Treaty =

The Tripartite Treaty may refer to:

- Tripartite Treaty (1838)
- Hewett Treaty (1884), between Ethiopia, Egypt, and the United Kingdom concerning ownership of Eritrea and the evacuation of Egyptian troops from Mahdist Sudan
- Tripartite Treaty (1906), between France, Italy, and the United Kingdom concerning Ethiopian sovereignty and railroad construction
- Treaty of Kyakhta (1915), between China, Russia and Mongolia wherein the latter was recognised as an autonomous part of China
- Tripartite Pact (1940), between Germany, Italy, and Japan, establishing the Axis alliance
- Tripartite Treaty (1942), tripartite Treaty Alliance of Iran, Britain, and the Soviet Union, see Anglo-Soviet Agreement § Effect
