= Battle of the Assem River =

Post-Zemene Mesafint conflict in Ethiopia

Battle of the Assem
Date	11 July 1871; 155 years ago
Location	Adwa, Tigray Province, Ethiopian Empire
Result	Victory for Kassa Mercha

Belligerents
Loyalists to Tekle Giyorgis II	Loyalists to Kassa Mercha

Commanders and leaders
Tekle Giyorgis II	Kassa Mercha; John 'J.C.' Kirkham

Strength
60,000	12,000

Casualties and losses
24,000 captured, many more killed and wounded	Unknown

The Battle of the Assem River was fought in 1871 between the forces of Kassa Mercha of Tigray and Emperor Tekle Giyorgis II. It resulted in victory for Kassa, allowing him to eventually become crowned as Emperor of Ethiopia. This battle has been noted by some as one of the first 'truly modern' battles in Ethiopian history, given that the tactics used by Kassa of Tigray revolved around the use of gunpowder weaponry.
