= Mercha Wolde Kidan =

Ethiopian governor (1820–1865)

Mercha Wolde Kidan ምርጫ ወልደ ኪዳን

Governor of Tembien Province
- Successor: Yohannes IV
- Born: 1820; Tembien, Tigray, Ethiopian Empire
- Died: 1865 (aged 44–45); Tembien, Tigray, Ethiopian Empire
- Spouse: Woizero Sellas Demtsu
- Father: Shum Tembien Welde Kidan Welde Mikael
- Mother: Woizero Werqweha
- Religion: Ethiopian Orthodox Tewahedo

Shum Tembien Mercha Wolde Kidan (Tigrinya: ምርጫ ወልደ ኪዳን, Mərcha Wäldä Kidan; 1820s – 1864/65) was the ruler of Tembien, a province of Tigray, and father of Kasa Mercha (later atse Yohannes IV). Mercha had his seat at Melfa in the mountainous Degwa Tembien. Due to his connections to the leading families of Tigray, he was regarded as one of the first nobles of the region. He himself, however, never acquired a central position within the Ethiopian power structure, but transmitted his own claims for rulership to his descendants.

== Biography ==
Mercha's mother, Weqweha, was married to shum Tembien WeldeKidan Weldemichael and traced her descent to ras Mikael Seoul, a great Tigrayan ruler. Mercha's Brother Dejazmatch Whade died November 1816 and having issued two daughters, Woizero Altash which married Ras Woldemichael Solomon and his second daughter Woizero Tibleze, her descendants live till this day. Mercha's wife woizero Sellas Demsu, was a daughter of Demsu Debbeb, the governor of Enderta and a grand-nephew of the famous Tigrayan ruler ras Wolde Selassie. Hence, woizero Sellas was connected to the main house of Enderta. Through her mother, woizero Tabotu Weldu, a sister of dejazmatch Sabagadis, last of the Tigrayan rulers of the Zemane Mesafen she was also connected to the house of Agame. In local tradition woizero Sellas appears as a courageous women, who died at the end of Tewodros's reign at the hands of his soldiers.

Both Mercha and Sellas supposedly had connections to the Solomonic dynasty. Mercha's mother, woizero Werqweha, was allegedly linked to this line through Mikael Seoul, while Mercha's wife traced her descent to atse Zara Yaqob and other rulers. These connections were utilized by Mercha's son Kasa, who claimed the imperial throne on the basis of his connections to three Solomonic kings. This provided the legal basis that he could be crowned as kings of Ethiopia.

Mercha and Sellas also had a daughter, Denqenash and three other sons, Gugsa, Maru and Hagos. When Mercha died, his sons joined the court of atse Tewodros II. This was a common practice, its purpose being for the prospective young leaders to learn the art of war and government, but above all to receive an appointment and return home with a title and an office. Gugsa, the elder son, already had experience of governorship having governed Enderta in 1861 after the death of his uncle, dejazmatch Haile Maryam Demsu. This was probably the reason why Tewodros gave him the title of dejazmatch. Maru was placed a step lower as fitawrari. At the time Kasa was placed the lowest, with the title of balambaras. Maru is said to have died at a young age. Etege Denqenash achieved a considerable political position through her marriages. She was first married to Gebre Kidan, a close follower of her brother Kasa in the early stages of his career. She then married wag shum Gobeze (later atse Tekle Giyorgis II) and had a son by him named Seyoum.
