= John Kirkham =

John Kirkham may refer to:

== Association football ==
- John B. Kirkham (1869–1930), English professional footballer
- John Kirkham (footballer, born 1918) (1918–1982), English professional footballer
- John Kirkham (footballer, born 1941) (1941–2021), English professional footballer

== Others ==
- John Kirkham (1472–1529) of Blagdon, Sheriff of Devon
- John Kirkham (adventurer) (died 1876), British adventurer, hotelier and ship's steward
- John Kirkham (bishop) (1935-2019), Anglican Bishop of Sherborne

== See also ==
- Jon Kirkham, British motorcycle racer
