= Tekle Giyorgis II =

Emperor of Ethiopia from 1868 to 1871

Tekle Giyorgis II ዳግማዊ ተክለ ጊዮርጊስ
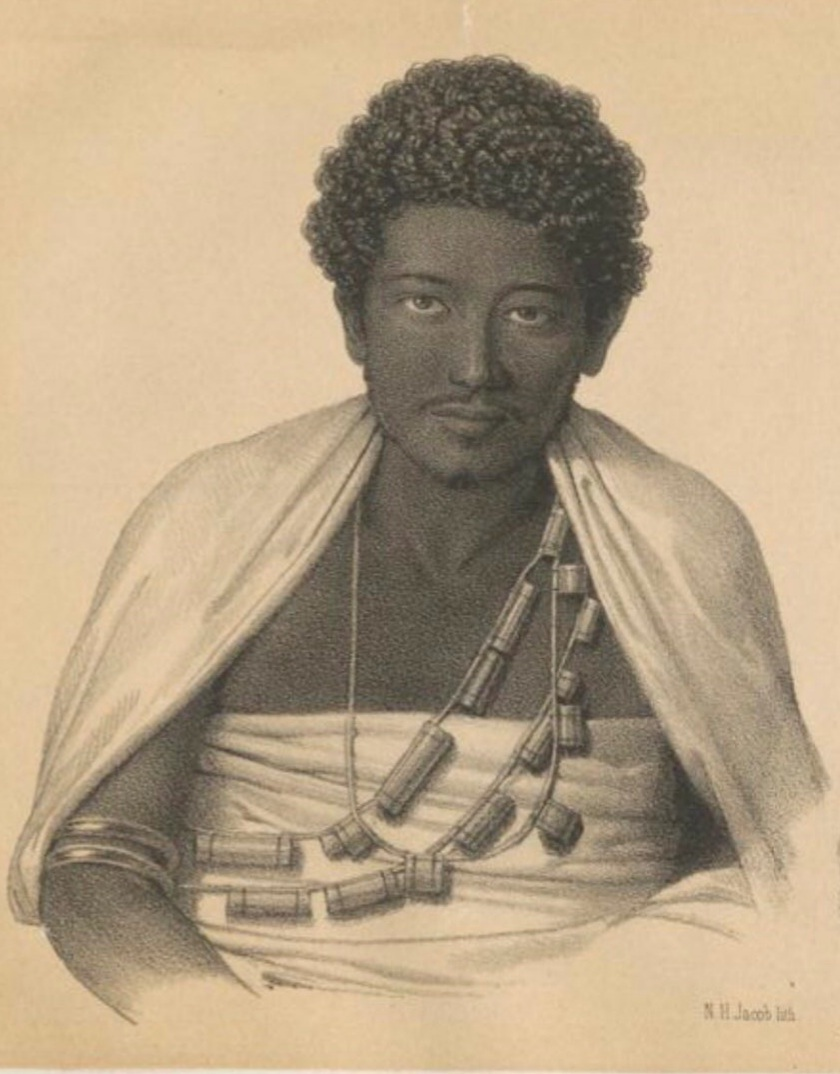
- Portrait of Tekle Giyorgis II by Théophile Lefebvre early 1850s

Emperor of Ethiopia
- Reign: August 1868 – 11 July 1871
- Proclamation: August 1868 (Soqota)
- Predecessor: Tewodros II
- Successor: Yohannes IV
- Born: 1836; Lasta, Ethiopian Empire
- Died: c. October 1873 (aged 36–37); Adwa, Tigray Province, Ethiopian Empire
- Burial: Abba Garima Monastery, Adwa
- Spouse: Dinqinesh Mercha
- Dynasty: House of Solomon (cognatic), House of Zagwe (agnatic)
- Father: Wagshum Gebre Medhin
- Mother: Princess Ayichesh Tedla Hailu
- Religion: Ethiopian Orthodox Tewahedo

Tekle Giyorgis II (Ge’ez: ተክለ ጊዮርጊስ, born Wagshum Gobeze (Amharic: ዋግሹም ጎበዜ), 1836 – c. October 1873) was Emperor of Ethiopia from 1868 to 1871. After being crowned, he linked himself to the last independent emperors of the Gondar line through his mother and sought support from the Ethiopian Church to strengthen his right to rule. He was wounded when fighting during the Battle of the Assem River, leading to the demoralization of his troops and capture of him and his generals and later on his death in captivity.

== Life ==
Gobeze, prior to his enthronement as Tekle Giyorgis II, enters the historical record when he raised the banner of rebellion in Lasta in 1864, (Note: The Encyclopaedia Aethiopica (vol. 4, p. 828) gives the rebellion as beginning in 1863, one year earlier than Rubenson's date.) six years after his father Wagshum Gebre Medhin had been executed by Emperor Tewodros II for accusations of supporting the rebel Agew Niguse. Prior to his rebellion, Tewodros II had appointed him däggazmaó and governor of Wag province in 1862.

Gobeze made his opening move even before the suicide of Emperor Tewodros II at the end of the 1868 British expedition to Ethiopia. When he rebelled, he initially went into exile before returning with an army assembled largely through the support of his maternal uncle, Dejazmach Mashasha Seyfu, and seized control of Lasta. In 1865, Gobeze pushed into Tigray and seized Adwa, at which point he confined the mother and brother of Kassai to a mountain fortress before the two men reached a temporary agreement that produced the marriage alliance. Towards the end of 1867, he began to march on Tewodros' fortress at Maqdala, but stopped about 50 kilometres (30 miles) away, and turned to fight Tiso Gobeze, who had revolted against Tewodros and had control of Begemder in northwest Ethiopia. Tiso was killed in battle at Qwila. By 1868, British General Napier estimated Gobeze's forces at roughly 60,000 men, a figure that helps explain how swiftly he was able to consolidate power following the death of Tewodros. In August 1868, Wagshum Gobeze was proclaimed Emperor Tekle Giyorgis II of Ethiopia at Soqota in his district of Wag and crowned at Debre Zebit, where his father had been executed. Because Abuna Salama, head of the Ethiopian Orthodox Church died in October 1867, he was crowned by Abba Gebre Iyasus, who held the office of Echege (እጨጌ) and had been appointed to the role specifically for the occasion given the absence of a metropolitan in Ethiopia.

=== Reign ===
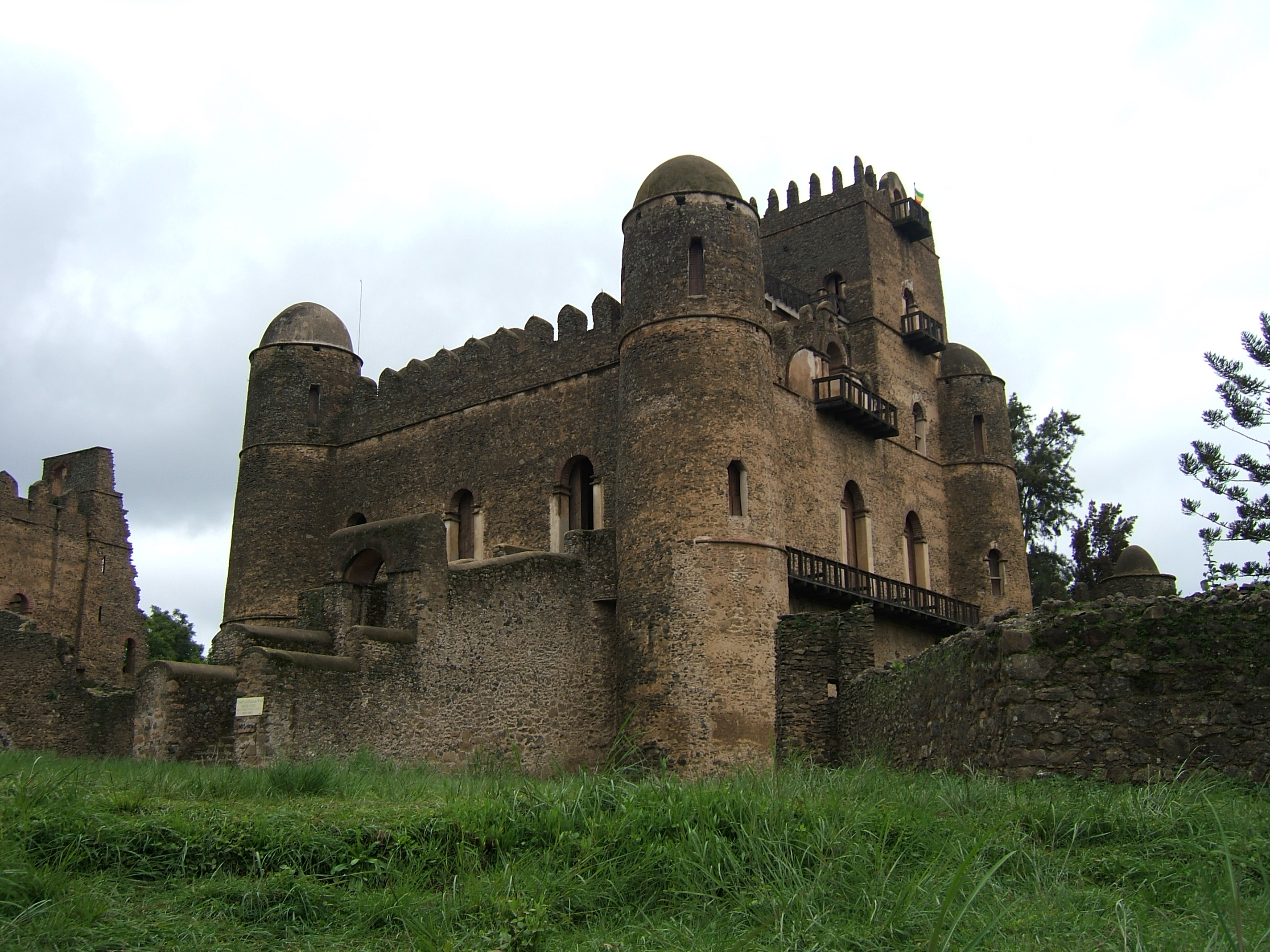
Castle of Emperor Fasilides at Gondar. Tekle Giyorgis II invested greatly in the restoration of Gondar city and its monuments.

Leading historian of Ethiopia, Donald Crummey comments on Gobeze's motivation for adopting "Tekle Giyorgis" as his regnal name "was unmistakable, and would have been clear to each peasant, let alone the learned. The previous ruler of that throne name had reigned off and on during the last two decades of the 18th century and had entered tradition with the nickname Fatsame Mangest, 'Ender of the Kingdom', or, very loosely, 'Last of the Line'". Tekle Giyorgis II linked himself to the last independent emperors of the Gondar line through his mother. In addition, Tekle Giyorgis sought the support of the Ethiopian Church, which had been alienated by Tewodros' behavior, by restoring the churches of Gondar, whose lands his predecessor had taken away, giving them generous quantities of equipment, and arranging for a special burial and commemoration for Abuna Salama. Crummey quotes the words of the chronicler, "After Fasil there was no one who did for Gondar as Ase Takla Giyorgis did."

Diplomatic appeals to Tekle Giyorgis' rivals failed to gain their acknowledgment of his new rank, although none of them were secure enough in their own territories to confront him. In Gojjam, Tekle Giyorgis replaced the head of the local branch of the Solomonic dynasty, with his own favored princeling, Ras Adal, and tied Adal more closely to him by marrying him to his sister Woizero Laqech Gebre Medhin. In Shewa, Tekle Giyorgis arranged for his half brother Hailu Wolde Kiros to marry Woizero Tisseme Darge, daughter of Ras Darge Sahle Selassie and thus first cousin to the King of Shewa, Menelik. He also conferred the title of Ras on his son Warenna. Tekle Giyorgis himself was married to Dinquinesh Mercha, sister of his Tigrean rival Dejazmatch Kassai. None of these ties of marriage would ultimately help solidify his hold on the throne. In 1870, using a Catholic missionary as an intermediary, Tekle Giyorgis wrote to Napoleon III expressing his readiness to receive French merchants and a consul in Ethiopia, part of a broader effort to gain international recognition that also included approaches to the British and Egyptian governments. Dejazmach Kassai enlisted the services of John Kirkham to train his army in the weapons the British had left him, and in 1870, having gained access to the sea, an advantage none of the Dejazmach's rivals had successfully obtained a new Abuna. Meanwhile, Menelik busied himself in Shewa, having decided according to Harold Marcus to allow his two rivals fight it out, despite Tekle Giyorgis' threatening march through Wollo to the borders of Shewa.

Emperor Tekle Giyorgis knew he must stand alone against Kassai, but did not move until June 1871 when he crossed the Takazze River in Tigray. On 21 June the two armies met at Maikol'u to fight a day-long battle; although Dejazmach Kassai had the smaller force it was better disciplined, and as Kirkham later wrote, "with 12 guns and 800 musketmen the battle was won against an undisciplined lot of men with matchlock guns and spears." Tekle Giyorgis came off the worse and retreated to the Mareb River the next day. However, the Dejazmach took another route, outflanked his opponent, and forced him into a cul-de-sac at Adwa, where they fought the final battle on 11 July. "Leading a cavalry charge into the midst of Kasa's force, Tekla Giyorgis was wounded, had his mount killed under him, and was taken prisoner," Marcus recounts. "His demoralized army collapsed and all his generals were captured with thousands of soldiers and camp followers." On 21 January 1872, Kassai proclaimed himself Emperor of Ethiopia with the name of Yohannes IV.

Tekle Giyorgis was blinded and imprisoned with his brother and mother at the Abba Garima Monastery near Adwa, where he was executed or died some years later.

== Genealogy ==
Emperor Tekle Giorgis II based his claim to the Imperial throne on a dual heritage: his mother, Princess Ayichesh Tedla, was a descendant of Emperor Iyasu I, also known as Atse Adiyam Saggad or Emperor Iyasu the Great, who was the grandson of Emperor Fasilides of the Gondar branch of the Solomonic dynasty; and via his father Wagshum Gebre Medhin, he was the heir to the old Zagwe throne and the rulers of Wag province.

Tekle Giyorgis II's mother, Princess Ayichesh Tedla, was the daughter of Dejazmach Tedla Hailu, of the Gondar branch of the Solomonic line, heir of Lasta, and one of twelve Amhara nobles who were executed during Tewodros II's rule. Dejazmach Tedla's death had caused a rebellion in Wollo. Nearly a century prior to the reign of Tekle Giyorgis II, Emperor Iyasu I's great-granddaughter, Princess Yeworqweha, had been wedded to Dejazmach Wand Bewossen, a renowned 18th-century warlord and ruling Zemene Mesafint prince who nearly established full control of the Ethiopian Empire and governed the provinces of Lasta and Begemeder until he died in battle in 1777. Their son and heir, Prince Ras Hailu Wand Bewossen — the successor of his father Wand Bewossen and sovereign of Lasta, of the Gondarine Solomonic bloodline, and father of the Gondar-Lasta House of the Solomonic dynasty — begot Princess Ayichesh's father, Dejazmach Tedla Hailu.

Princess Ayichesh was also the paternal grandmother of Leul Ras Kassa Haile Darge. Leul Ras Kassa's father, Dejazmach Hailu, was her younger son and the half-brother of Tekle Giyorgis II, to whom she had given birth from a remarriage with an influential Lasta ecclesiastic and nobleman—Dejazmach Megabe Woldekiros. Princess Ayichesh remarried after the execution of her husband—the then-King of Wag province, and father of Tekle Giyorgis II—Wagshum Gebremedhin. Tekle Giyorgis II's uncles, the sons of Dejazmach Tedla Hailu, played significant roles as members of the Gondar-Lasta Imperial House, brothers of his mother—whom he referred to as his brothers in surviving Imperial letters. They interceded as high Imperial officials and his generals during his rise to the throne and throughout his three-year reign until his fall. Prince Ras Meshesha Tedla is known to have ruled Wag province, and Dejazmach Serawit Tedla, Dejazmach Yimam Tedla, Dejazmach Yesufe Tedla, Dejazmach Yimer Tedla were notable princes of the Gondar-Lasta Solomonic bloodline descended from Emperors Fasilides, Yohannes I, and Iyasu I. Dejazmach Yimer Tedla fathered Princess Menen Yimer, the maternal ancestress of Lij Tedla Melaku, a philosopher, author, and Abyssinian monarchist.

Emperor Tekle Giorgis II's principal rivals for sole rule were Menelik II (who was at the time king of Shewa), and Dejazmach Kassai (the future Emperor Yohannes IV). Tekle Giyorgis II married the sister of the latter, Dinqinesh Mercha. Despite that Tekle Giyorgis ruled Ethiopia for over three years, some lists of the emperors of Ethiopia omit his name. In Ethiopia today, little is known of him, in contrast to his celebrated predecessor and successor.

== Notes ==
=== Citations ===
Tekle Giyorgis II House of Solomon
Regnal titles
Preceded by Tewodros II	Emperor of Ethiopia; 1868–1871	Succeeded by Yohannes IV
