= Peter Kirkham =

English footballer (born 1974)

Personal information
- Full name: Peter Jonathan Kirkham
- Date of birth: 28 October 1974
- Place of birth: Newcastle upon Tyne, England
- Position: Winger

Youth career
- Newcastle United

Senior career*
Years	Team	Apps	(Gls)
1993–1995	Darlington	13	(0)
1995	Köping FF	6	
- Gretna
- Blyth Spartans
- South Shields
- Grantham Town
1999–????	Chester-le-Street Town		
- Dunston Federation Brewery
2001–2002	Jarrow		
2002–2003	Hebburn Town		
2003–2004	Consett		
2004–2005	Whitley Bay		
2005–2006	Washington		
2006–2013	Jarrow		

Managerial career
- 2011–2016: Jarrow
- * Club domestic league appearances and goals

Peter Jonathan Kirkham (born 28 October 1974) is an English former footballer who played as a winger in the Football League for Darlington.

== Life and career ==
Kirkham was born in Newcastle upon Tyne, and began his career as a youngster with Newcastle United. He never played first-team football for Newcastle, and moved on to Darlington in 1993. He made his senior debut on 2 November 1993, in the starting eleven for the Third Division match at home to Colchester United. Darlington won 7–3, and Kirkham made nine more appearances that season, mainly as a substitute. He played in six matches in 1994–95, and left the club at the end of that season.

Kirkham played in Sweden for Köping FF, and also played non-league football for teams including Gretna, Blyth Spartans, South Shields, Grantham Town, Chester-le-Street Town, Dunston Federation Brewery, Jarrow – for whom he scored the decisive penalty in the shoot-out that won the club's first ever Wearside League trophy, the Shipowners' Charity Cup, in 1995 – Hebburn Town, Consett, Whitley Bay, and Washington.

He returned to Jarrow in 2006, was assistant manager to Davy Bell by 2010, and took over as player-manager with Bell becoming his assistant. Kirkham played until at least 2013, and in January 2016, he again became Bell's assistant when the latter returned to Jarrow as manager.
