= Abuna Mattheos X =

Ethiopian Orthodox archbishop (1843–1926)

- Abuna of Ethiopia
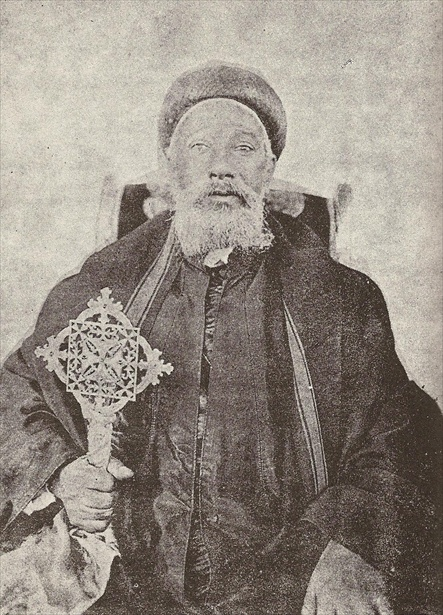
- Abuna Mattheos X
- Church: Ethiopian Orthodox Tewahedo Church
- In office: 1889–1926
- Predecessor: Petros VII
- Successor: Qerellos IV

Personal details
- Born: 1843 Egypt Eyalet
- Died: 1926 (aged 82–83) Ethiopian Empire
- Denomination: Oriental Orthodoxy

Abuna Mattheos (Matewos) X (1843–1926) was a Coptic priest from Egypt, who came to Ethiopia in 1881, becoming a bishop of Shewa under King Sahle Mariam. When Sahle Mariam became the Emperor of Ethiopia under the regnal name Menelik II in 1889, Mattheos then became Archbishop of the Ethiopian Orthodox Tewahedo Church until his death.

In 1916, on behalf of the Ethiopian church, Mattheos announced the dethronement and excommunication of the uncrowned Emperor of Ethiopia Lij Iyasu (Iyasu V), who reportedly converted to Islam.

Oriental Orthodox titles
Preceded by Petros VII	Abuna of Ethiopia; 1889–1926	Succeeded by Qerellos IV
