= Abuna Atnatewos II =

Abuna (head) of the Ethiopian Orthodox Tewahedo Church from 1869 to 1876

Abuna Atnatewos II (Athanasius) was an Egyptian Copt who served as the Abuna or head of the Ethiopian Orthodox Tewahedo Church (1869–1876).

== Background ==
Originally a Coptic bishop from Egypt, he was brought to Ethiopia by Emperor Yohannes IV, who raised the $20,000 to pay Cyril V, Pope of the Coptic Orthodox Church.

Abuna Atnatewos actively worked against the influence of Catholic missionaries; Asseggahen wrote to Antoine Thomson d'Abbadie that Atnatewos anathematized the Catholic bishop Massaia, and threatened to excommunicate the inhabitants of Shewa were they to associate with him.

The Abuna supported Emperor Yohannes' campaign against the Egyptian attempt to annex Hamasien. It is reported that Abuna Atnatewos was wounded at the Battle of Gura, later dying on 29 June 1876.
