= Yohannes IV =

Emperor of Ethiopia from 1871 to 1889

Yohannes IV ዮሓንስ ፬ይ
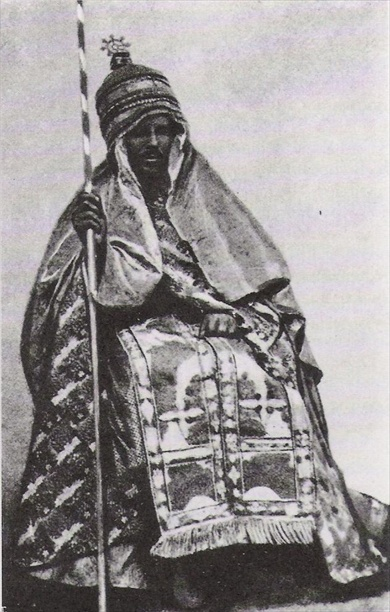
- Yohannes IV c. 1872–1889

Emperor of Ethiopia
- Reign: 11 July 1871 – 10 March 1889
- Coronation: 12 January 1872
- Predecessor: Tekle Giyorgis II
- Successor: Menelik II

King of Tigray
- Reign: 1869 - 1871
- Successor: Araya Selassie Yohannes
- Born: 11 July 1837; May Baha, Tembien, Ethiopian Empire
- Died: 10 March 1889 (aged 51); Gallabat, Mahdist Sudan
- Spouse: Woizero Tibebe Selassie
- Issue: Ras Araya Selassie; Ras Mengesha
- Dynasty: House of Solomon (cognatic)
- Father: Dejazmatch Mercha Wolde Kidan, Shum of Tembien
- Mother: Woizero Silass Dimtsu of Chelekot, Enderta
- Religion: Ethiopian Orthodox

Styles of Yohannes IV of Ethiopia
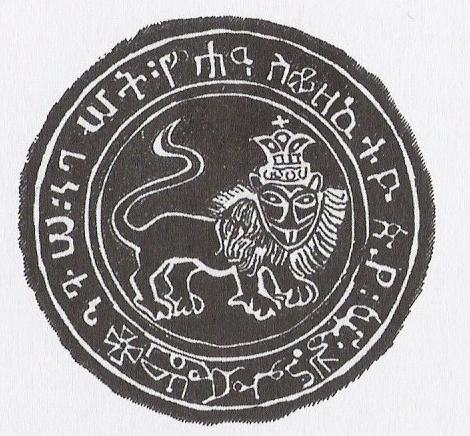
- Reference style: Tigrinya: ግርማዊ girmāwī His Imperial Majesty
- Spoken style: Amharic: ጃንሆይ djānhoi Your Imperial Majesty (lit. "O [esteemed] royal")
- Alternative style: Amharic: ጌቶቹ getochu Our Lord (familiar) (lit. "Our master" (pl.)) yohanes

Yohannes IV (Tigrinya: ዮሓንስ ፬ይ Rabaiy Yōḥānnes; horse name Abba Bezbiz also known as Kahśsai; born Lij Kahssai Mercha; 11 July 1837 – 10 March 1889) was Emperor of Ethiopia from 1871 to his death in 1889 at the Battle of Gallabat, and king of Tigray from 1869 to 1871. During his reign he successfully defended Ethiopia against a large-scale Egyptian invasion.

In his earlier years, he rebelled against Tewodros II; having risen to power in the 1860s, he maintained the policy of Tewodros, that of continued unification and also implemented a policy of touring entire regions and meetings with governors. He assisted the British in their British expedition to Abyssinia which ended in Tewodros' suicide, from which Yohannes was rewarded in ammunition and artillery. He regarded Islam as a hindrance to the stability of the state and worked to strengthen Christian dominance in Ethiopia. Its estimated that he had forcely converted 550,000 Oromos and Jebertis to Christianity. In foreign policy, he had disagreements and military conflicts with both Isma'il Pasha of the Khedivate of Egypt and Muhammad Ahmad during the latter's Mahdist War.

== Origin and early life ==
On the side of his father, Mercha Wolde Kidan, Yohannes descended from the ruling family of Tembien where both his father and grandfather bore the traditional title of šum Tembien, while his mother, Silas Dimtsu, was a daughter of balgäda Demtsu of Enderta and Tabotu Woldu of Agame, hence a niece of Sabagadis Woldu. He thus descended from the ruling families of Tembien, Agame, and Enderta. Yohannes Solomonic lineage is through his paternal grandmother Woizero Workewoha KaleKristoss of Adwa, the granddaughter of Ras Mikael Sehul and his wife Aster Iyasu, daughter of Empress Mentewab and Melmal Iyasu, who was a Solomonic prince and nephew of Emperor Bakaffa. Therefore Yohannes is descended from the Gondrarine Branch of the Solomonic dynasty.

The first half of his life is poorly documented, with the date of his birth given between 1831 and 1837. The available sources indicate that he was the youngest of his siblings, that he had a seriously ailing childhood, that he received some church education, and that he was initiated to manhood after killing some wild animals (lions and/or elephants) for trophies. The first mention of his appearance in the political arena comes up in connection with his visit to the imperial court of Tewodros II in 1864–1865 in the company of his brothers, Gugsa and Maru. Gugsa was given the title of däjazmač, and Maru that of fit’awrari. The lowest title, of balambaras, was bestowed upon Kaśa, who was subsequently assigned to administer a sub-district within the governorship of his elder brother, Gugsa.

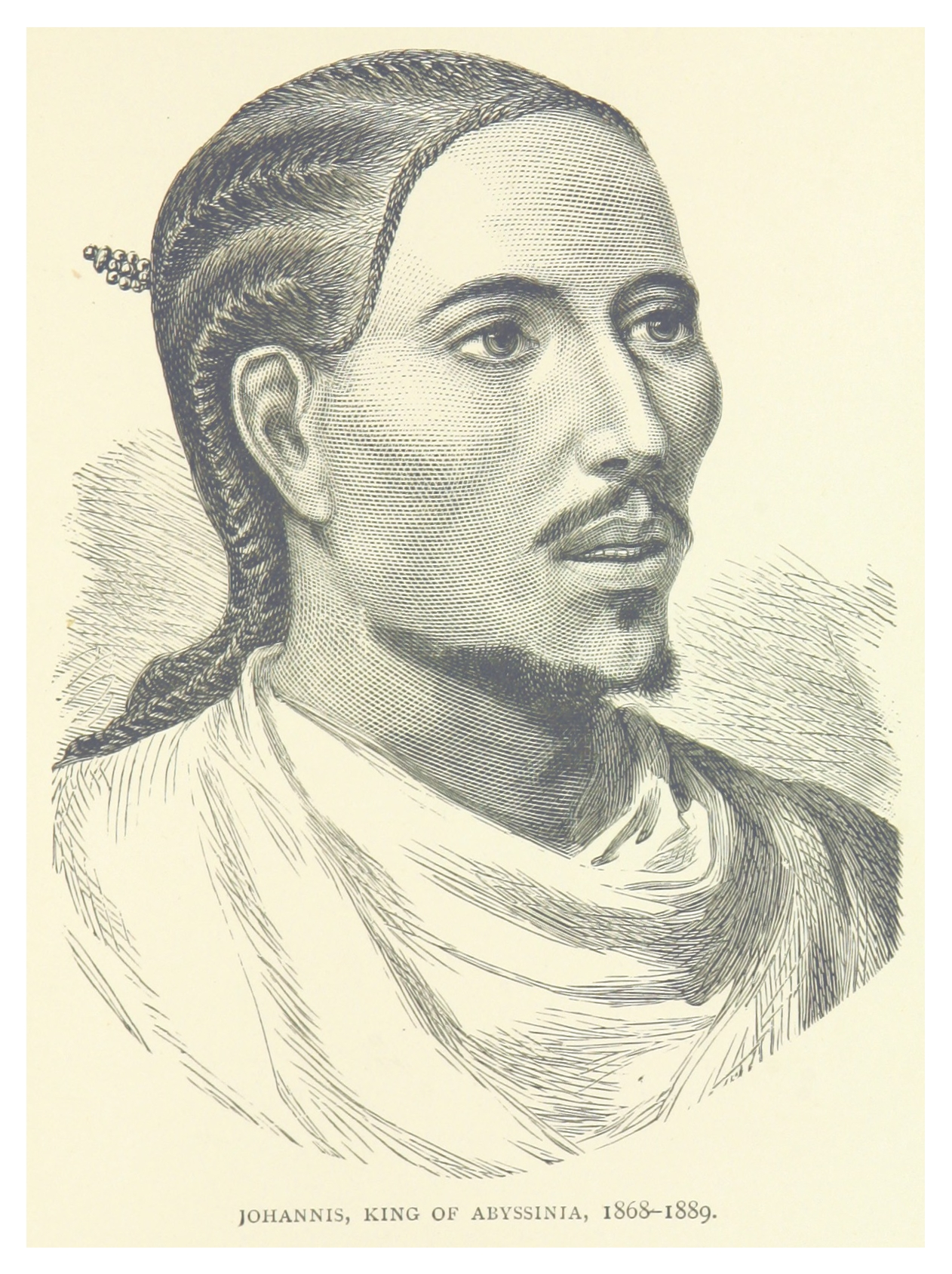
Portrait of Emperor Yohannes IV

Shortly after their return to Tigray, Kaśa rebelled against the rule of Tewodros. What prompted his rebellion is not well established. Often two explanations, which are not essentially contradictory, are forwarded by the sources: the first is related to his dissatisfaction with the rank and function given to him by the sovereign, while the second interprets his rebellion as a response to the appeal of abunä Salama who in 1867 wrote from prison to many notables condemning his perceived injustices of Tewodros. In any case, for some time he (together with his followers) retired to the eastern lowlands and found refuge among the Afar, from which ethnic group he married a Muslim after she had been baptized with the name Tebaba Sellasie.

Returning to the highlands, he raised more men and began his military campaign: in the years 1864–1867, he consecutively defeated šum seraye Gebre Mikael, däjazmač Barya'u Gebre Sadeq of Adwa and däjazmač Tekle Giyorgis Qalos of Shire. Barya'u transferred his allegiance to Kaśa whom he served faithfully until he was killed in a battle some ten years later. Tekle Giyorgis (who had killed Kaśa's mother, Silass) fell in battle, and Kaśa subsequently assumed his title of däjazmač. Kaśa then formed an alliance with wag šum Gobez Gebre Medhin of Lasta against Tewodros and began to harass the imperial representatives on both sides of the Mareb River. He defeated the governors of Selewa and Kilte Awulaelo. In Hamasien, däjazmač Haylu Tewolde Medhen, who contemplated resistance, was confined and replaced with däjazmač (later ras) Woldemichael Solomon who had actively participated in Kaśa's military campaign against the imperial officials in Tigray. A French explorer described him as:

The Negus of Ethiopia is a man of great strength of body, and energy of mind, as well as force of will. He is about forty years of age, of middle height, but sinewy and muscular; with most aristocratic hands and feet, although, like his subjects, he marches with bare feet, placing only his great toe in the stirrup, when on horseback, in Abyssinian fashion. His face is oval, with high forehead, large restless eyes, an aquiline nose and wide mouth. His skin is not black, but of a dark olive tint; his hair plaited in an infinite number of small tresses, carefully knotted together at the nape of the neck with a silken cord. He looks more like a Greek or Portuguese than an African. In anger his eyes blaze like burning coals. In speech he is brief, clear and persuasive.

== Rise to power ==
The imperial ambitions of Behaile Selassie are consolidated towards the end of the reign of Tewodros II; as early as 1867, he presented himself, during a correspondence with the British, as ruler of Ethiopia. During the same year, a diplomatic dispute between Tewodros and the British government led the expedition to Abyssinia in order to free the European captives imprisoned there by Tewodros. From February 1868, Yohannes came into contact with British officers, including the commander of the expedition, Sir Robert Napier, who sends Major James Augustus Grant, a British explorer, to meet the ruler of Tigray. Yohannes is then perceived by James as a “weak and easily manipulated man, aspiring to become a great leader of Ethiopia." After three hearings, Yohannes officially agrees to help Napier. This then facilitates the provisioning of the troops by installing markets near the main camp sites. Yohannes assures the British that he will help them “with all [his] power."

Yohannes undertakes to protect the supply routes from the coast to Magdala and to repress those who disturb the telegraph. In return, Yohannes asked Napier during a meeting on February 28, 1868, for the participation of British forces in his fight against Wagshum Gobeze. Napier refused but maintained the possibility, after the campaign, of military assistance which Yohannes and his 10,000 men greatly needed. On April 10, 1868, the expeditionary force arrived at the foot of Magdala and, three days later, after refusing to surrender to the British, the Nəgusä nägäst Tewodros II committed suicide. Napier's victory and the ease with which the expedition reached Magdala was made possible by Yohannes. The British officers themselves admit that they were "lucky" to have obtained the cooperation of the leader of Tigray. A report written by one of the British officers stating that: “The British army could not have reached Magdala during this season, without having received the help of the chiefs and the people of the country”.

In return for the help that Yohannes provided the British, he received military equipment, estimated at 500,000 Pounds sterling, including: six mortars, six howitzers, approximately 900 muskets and rifles, ammunition, powder and 585,480 primers percussion. This armament is added to the already important arsenal of Yohannes. After the Magdala expedition, the British disengaged completely and Yohannes' offers of cooperation were rejected or ignored. Even after his seizure of imperial power, he failed to arouse the interest of the British. Nevertheless, the Napier expedition had an impact on the struggle for power; in addition to military equipment, a British instructor, John C. Kirkham, agrees to stay in Ethiopia to train the troops of Yohannes. He is responsible for training the troops of Yohannes and preparing them for the use of modern weapons received from the British. According to the Historian Bahru Zewde, the combination of new weapons and the training provided by John Kirkham determined the fight against Tekle Giyorgis.

Following the death of Tewodros, Gobeze Gebre Medhin, had himself crowned as nəgusä nägäst Tekle Giyorgis II. He successfully suppressed rebellions of ras Wolde Maryam of Begemender and Fares Ali of Yejju. Yohannes however, refused to acknowledge the new metropolitan abunä Atnatewos II sent from Alexandria in June 1869, and kept him in his dominion. However, Tekle Giyorgis is not fooled and he quickly understands Yohannes' intentions. Although having a much larger army in numbers, Tekle Giyorgis does not have the modern weapons which Yohannes have. In addition to that, his troops include many soldiers from Tigray and he fears their change of camp in favor of Yohannes. Thus, Tekle Giyorgis seeks the collaboration of Menelik in order to consolidate a purely numerical advantage. However, the Negus of Shewa refuses to join in the fight, preferring to see the two great Warlords confront each other and tire each other. Finally, on 11 July 1871, Tekle Giyorgis confronted Kaśa in the Battle of Adwa, but was defeated and confined to Enda Abba Selma, Tembien, where he would die two years later.

== Internal policy ==
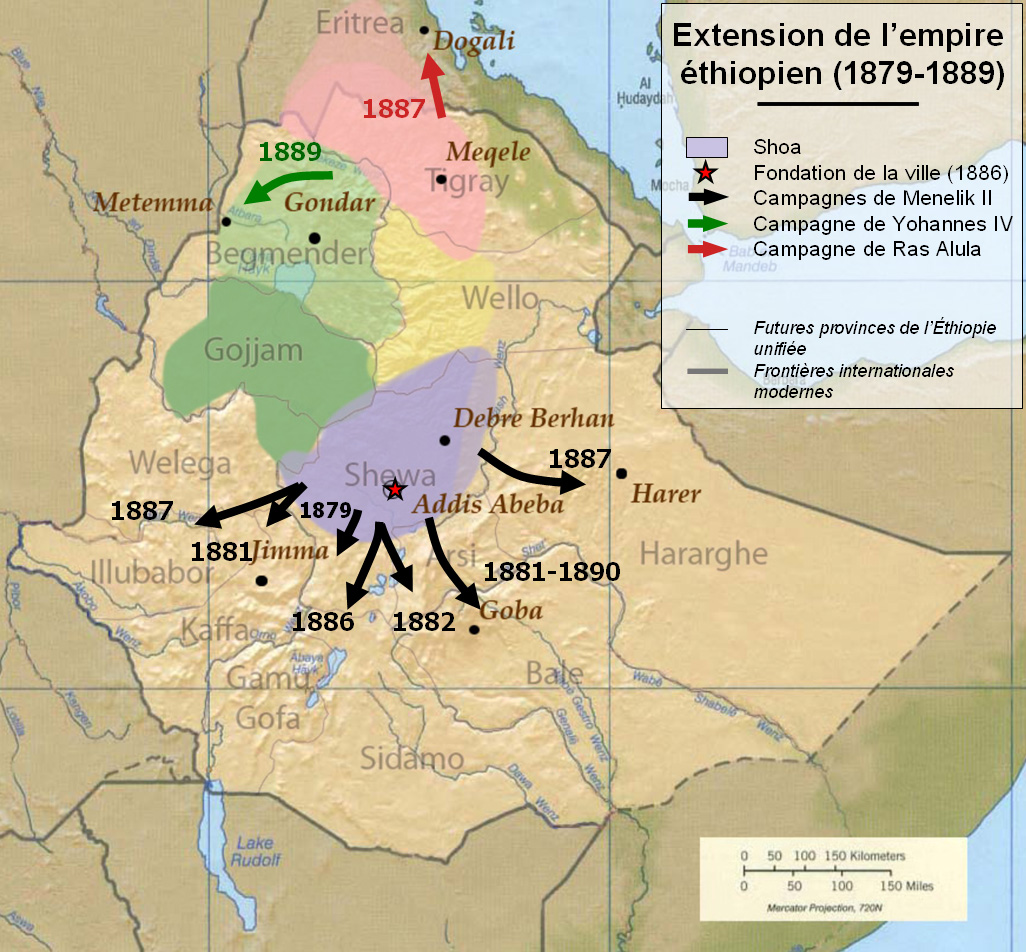
The conquests of Yohannes IV, Emperor Menelik and general Ras Alula in 1879–1889

The principle of Yohannes's internal policy was to continue the legacy of Tewodros II by trying to unite Ethiopia. To ensure the realization of this policy, he toured each region and meeting appointed governors, usually from the local nobility, regardless of their former attitudes toward him, as long as they submitted and expressed to him their unflinching loyalty. He thus managed, as the contemporary English vice-consul put it, "to hold the scales of justice with a firm and even hand"; "it was in 1884 the boast of King Yohannes that a child could pass through his dominions unharmed". In the first six years of his reign, he succeeded in achieving the unity of the predominantly Christian provinces, including Wag and Lasta, Semien and Begemder, Sayint, Gojjam, Wollo and Shewa. He crowned Menelik King of Shewa in 1878 and Tekle Haymanot King of Gojjam and Kaffa in 1881 and encouraged them to expand their empire to the south, east, and west. However, this advice created rivalry between the two regional kings, which came to a climax in the Battle of Embabo in June 1882. Yohannes reprimanded both of them for fighting without his permission, punished them by taking away a province from the jurisdiction of each of them and defined the direction of territories to be conquered by each of the two kings.

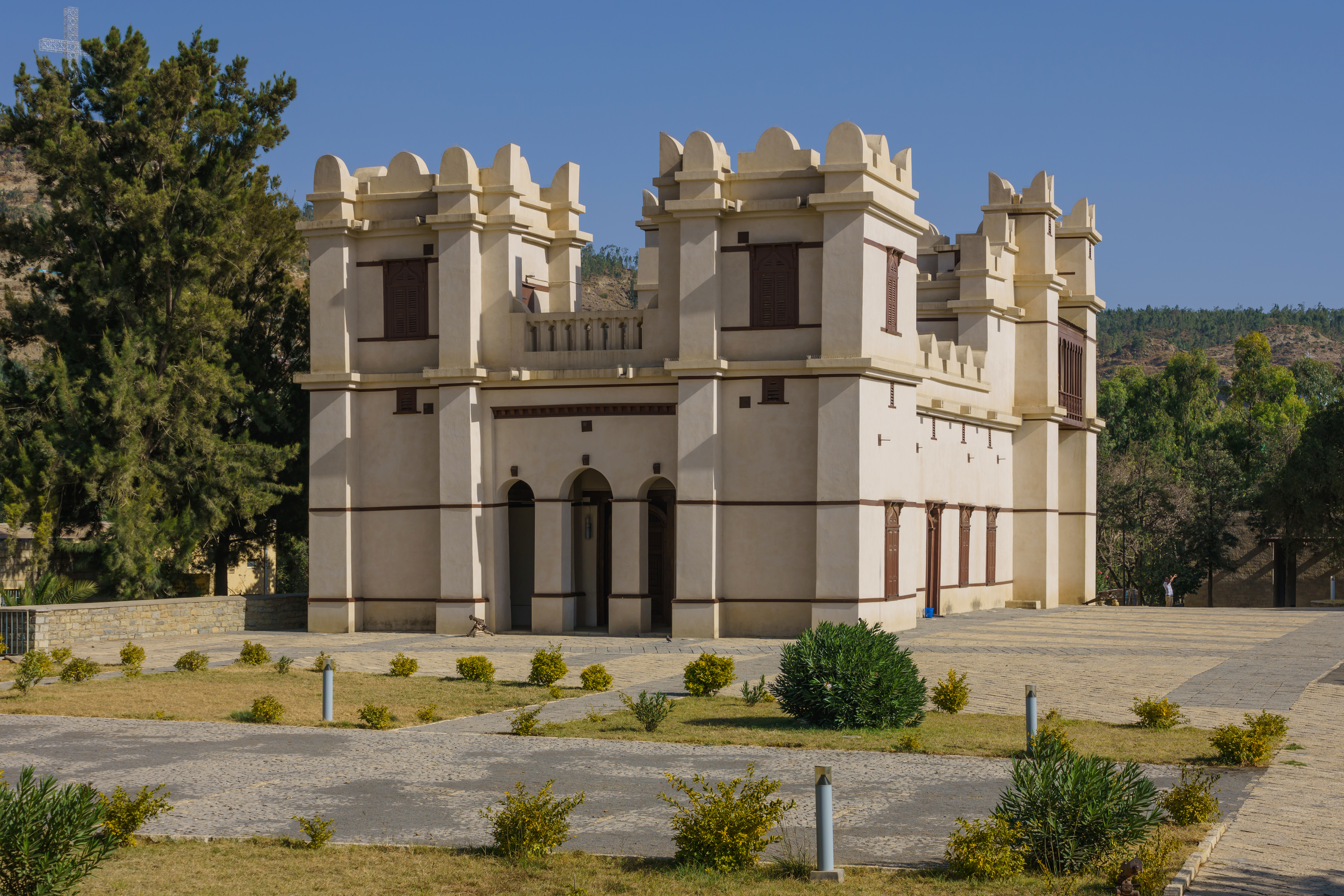
Atse Yohannes IV castle (museum) in Mekelle

When Yohannes was crowned emperor he established his capital in Adwa which was his seat for a decade before he shifted the capital in 1881 to Mekelle, but he still retained Debre Tabor as his primary residence.

=== Religious policy ===
Yohannes inherited the empire encumbered with three religious questions which provoked him to seek a solution: the internal dissensions of the Ethiopian Orthodox Tewahedo Church (EOC), Islam, and Christian foreign missionary activities. He regarded all of them as menaces to the unity and stability of the state.

By 1878, Yohannes was ready to tackle the problems by summoning a council at Boru Meda, Wollo. Most of the high dignitaries and notables of Ethiopia were present at the council. The leading theologians of the three major disputing groups of the EOC — Karra (predominant in the north), Sägga or Śost Lədät (prevalent in Begemeder and Shewa) and Qəbat (based in Gojjam and Lasta) — tried to defend their respective doctrines. Yohannes readily accepted corrections made by a notable on procedural matters. Apparently, he had a long-prepared plan for the council, as he had a letter from the patriarch of Alexandria read out at the end of the disputation which endorsed the imperial tenet. The policy transcended Yohannes's reign, though there were indications that the suppressed tenets had by no means been eradicated. Any Śost Lədät supporters who protested the council had their tongues cut out.

Yohannes was known to harbor deep resentment towards Islam, a Sudanese official was reported stating "Yohannes is the most hateful of the Abyssinians towards Islam. Someone who knew him told me that if he saw a Muslim in the morning it would depress him so that he would immediately take the cross which he worships and put it over his face." During the council at Boru Meda, he summoned the major Oromo chiefs of Wollo. According to an Ethiopian chronicler, Yohannes told them:

We are your apostles. All this [Wollo and the central highlands] used to be Christian land until Gragn ruined and misled it. Now let all, whether Muslim or Galla [Oromo], believe in the name of Jesus Christ! If you wish to live in peace and preserve your belongings, become Christians.

It is estimated that by 1880 some 50,000 Jebertis (Tigrinya speaking Muslims) and 500,000 Oromos had been forced to convert to Christianity from Islam.

== Foreign policy ==
=== War with Ottoman Egypt ===
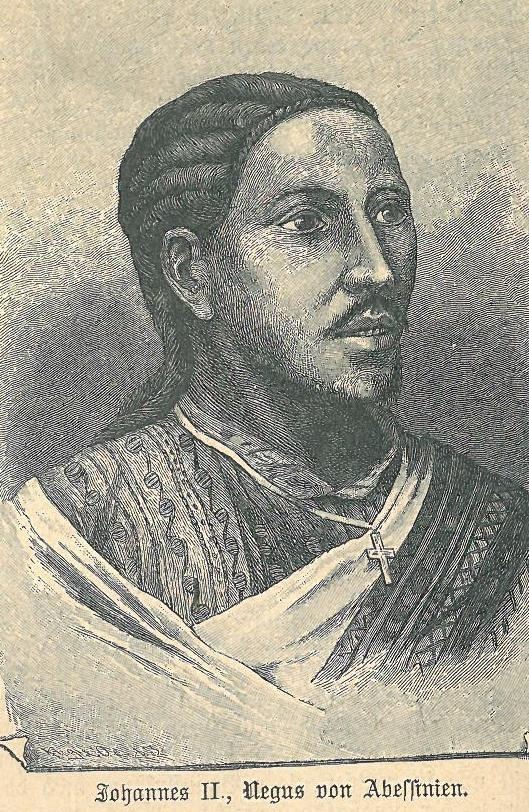
Yohannes IV

Throughout his reign, Yohannes was embroiled in military struggles on his northern frontiers. First was from Khedive Isma'il Pasha of Egypt, who sought to bring the entire Nile River basin under his rule. The Egyptians flirted with encouraging Menelik of Shewa against the King, but earned Menelik's enmity by marching from the port of Zeila and occupying the city-state of Harar on 11 October 1875. Both Menelik and Yohannes had regarded Harar as a renegade province of Ethiopia, and Egyptian seizure of the Emirate was not welcomed to either of them. The Egyptians then marched into northern Ethiopia from their coastal possessions around the port of Massawa. Yohannes pleaded with the British to stop their Egyptian allies and even withdrew from his own territory in order to show the Europeans that he was the wronged party and that the Khedive was the aggressor. However, Yohannes soon realized that the Europeans would not stop the Khedive of Egypt and so he gathered up his armies and marched to meet the Egyptian force.

The two armies met at Gundet (also called Guda-gude) on the morning of 16 November 1875. The Egyptians were tricked into marching into a narrow and steep valley and were wiped out by Ethiopian gunners surrounding the valley from the surrounding mountains. Virtually the entire Egyptian force, along with its many officers of European and North American background, were killed. News of this huge defeat was suppressed in Egypt for fear that it would undermine the government of the Khedive. A new Egyptian force was assembled and sent to avenge the defeat at Gundet. The Egyptians were defeated again at the Battle of Gura (7–9 March 1876), where the Ethiopians were led again by the Emperor, and his loyal general, the capable (and future Ras) Alula Engida. This victory was followed by Menelik's submission to Yohannes on 20 March 1878, and in return, Yohannes recognized Menelik's hereditary right to the title of King (Negus) of Shewa, and re-crowned him on 26 March. Yohannes took this opportunity to tie the Shewan King more closely to him by arranging for Menelik's daughter Zewditu (the future Empress of Ethiopia in her own right), to be married to his own son and heir, Ras Araya Selassie. Victor of the Egyptian-Ethiopian War and undisputed Neguse Negest, in 1878 Yohannes was at the high point of his reign. (See Ethiopian aristocratic and court titles).

Emperor Yohannes also convened a general council of the Ethiopian Church at Boru Meda later in 1878, which brought an end to the ongoing theological dispute in the local church; Christians, Muslims, and pagans were given respectively two, three and five years to conform to the council's decisions. Non-Christians were forbidden from participating in the government unless they converted and were baptized; the Muslims were given three months, while the pagans had to become Christians immediately. "Having concluded that Wollo was worth a mass," as Harold Marcus wryly puts it, his retainer Ras Mohammed of Wollo became disobedient of the tax rules, which he and the entire Wollo refused to pay tax to the government in which Emperor Yohannes had discovered, Ras Mohammed was conspiring with the Turks the Ottoman Empire because of his Muslim affiliation. Ras Mohammed was brought to Emperor Yohannes and was confronted of his conspiracy in helping the Muslim colonizer and to bring down the Judeo Christian empire. Ras Mohammed was siding with Muslim Affiliates of Turkey. After meeting with King Yohannes and in learning that if he were to assist the Turks, in the end, he and the rest of Ethiopia would become a slave to the Arab/Muslim world. Ras Mohammed then chose to become a Christian to later inherit a Christian name (later Negus) Mikael of Wollo, the Emperor stood as his godfather at his baptism. The new convert was given Menelik of Shewa's other daughter, Shewarega Menelik, as his wife. Yohannes went one step further and pressured Menelik to expel all of the Roman Catholic missionaries from Shewa. However this time, instead of a single Archbishop, he requested that Patriarch Cyril send four to serve the large number of Christians in Ethiopia, who arrived in 1881. They were led by Abuna Petros as Archbishop, Abuna Matewos for Shewa, Abuna Luqas for Gojjam and Abuna Markos for Gondar. Abuna Markos died shortly after arriving, so his diocese was included with that of Abuna Luqas. It was the first time that the Coptic Patriarch of Alexandria had appointed four Bishops for Ethiopia.

=== War with Sudan ===
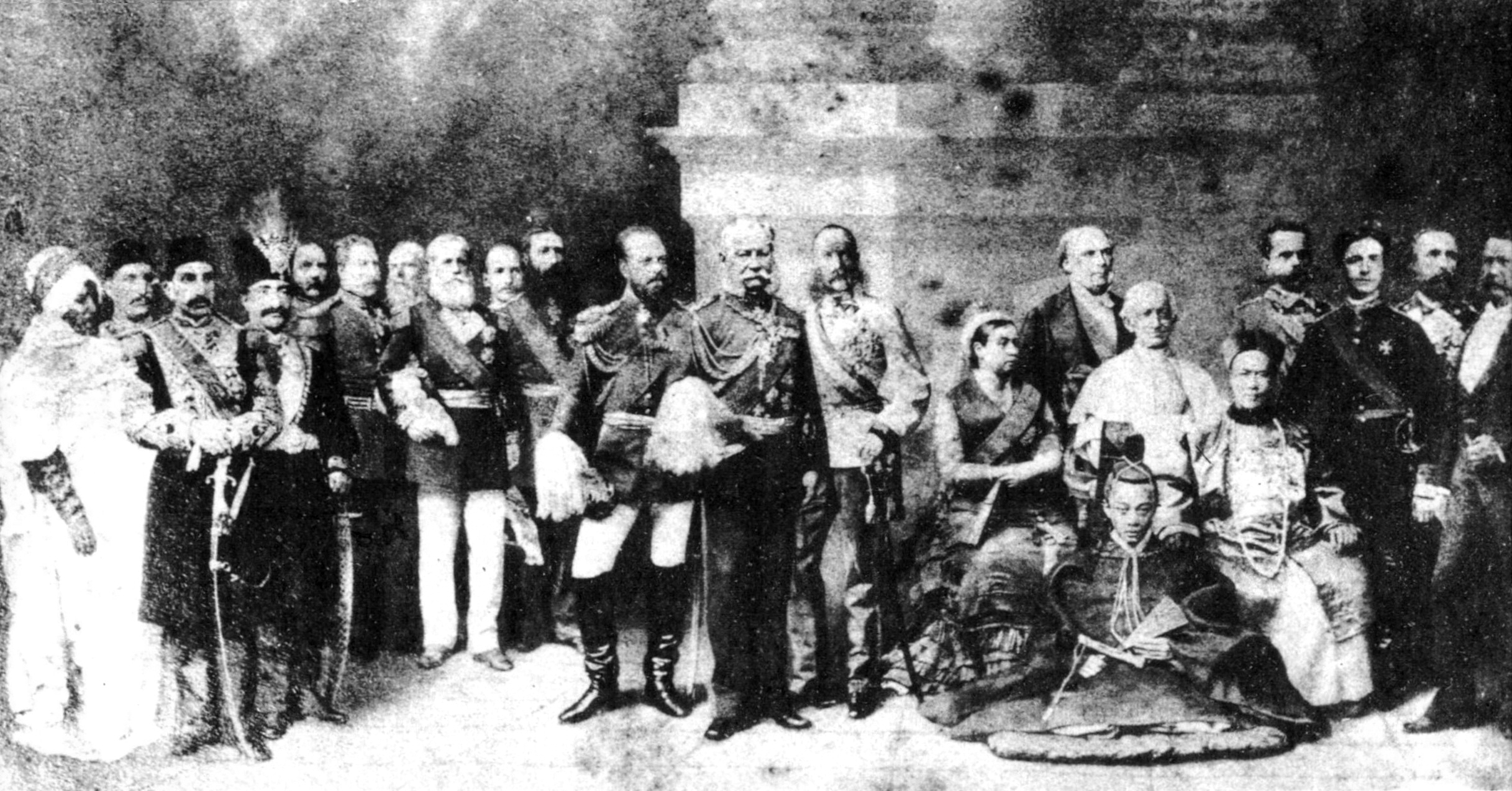
World heads of state in 1889. Yohannes is first from the left.

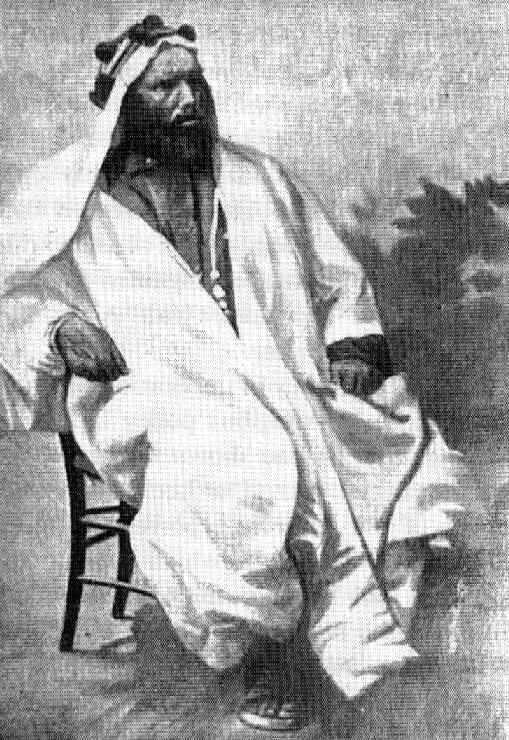
Ras Alula Engida, Grand General of Yohannes IV, participated in the Egyptian-Ethiopian War, the Mahdist War, and the First Italo-Ethiopian War.

When Muhammad Ahmad proclaimed himself the Mahdi (a prophesied Islamic leader who would precede the Day of Judgement), and incited Turkish Sudan into a long and violent revolt, his followers successfully drove part of the Egyptian garrisons out of Sudan and isolated the rest at Suakin and at various posts in the south. Yohannes agreed to British requests to allow these Egyptian soldiers to evacuate through his lands, with the understanding that the British Empire would then support his claims on important ports like Massawa on the Red Sea to import weapons and ammunition in the event that Egypt was forced to withdraw from them. This was formalized in a treaty signed with the British at Adwa known as the Hewett Treaty. According to the treaty, the Ethiopians would allow the Egyptians to safely evacuate out of certain cities such as Kassala, which aggravated the Mahdists even more. Ras Alula Engida defeated an invading Mahdist army at the Battle of Kufit on 23 September 1885. About the same time, Italy took control of the port of Massawa, frustrating Ethiopian hopes and angering Yohannes.

Yohannes attempted to work out some kind of understanding with the Italians, so he could turn his attention to the more pressing problem of the Mahdists, although Ras Alula took it upon himself to attack Italian units that were on both sides of the ill-defined frontier between the two powers. Domestic problems increased when the Neguses of both Gojjam and Shewa rebelled against Yohannes, and the Emperor had to turn his attention from the encroaching Italians to deal with his rebellious vassals. Yohannes brutally crushed the Gojjame rebellion, but before he could turn his attention to Shewa news arrived that the Mahdist forces had sacked Gondar and burned its holy churches. He marched north from Gojjam to confront the armies of the Mahdi.

== Death ==
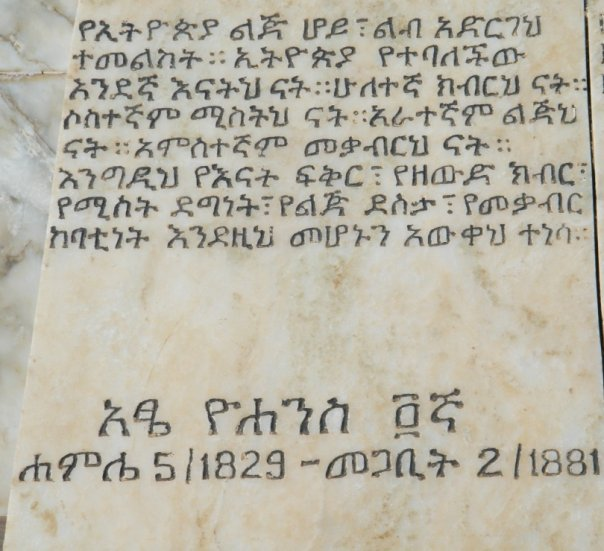
An Amharic inscription remembering Yohannes IV's call to arms.

Yohannes was killed by the Mahdists at the Battle of Gallabat that took place on 9–10 March 1889 in Metemma near the Sudanese border. Evidence suggests that Emperor Yohannes had acted rashly and had made himself vulnerable, going beyond enemy lines in a range of enemy shots as victory was going to his side, and was mortally wounded by a gunshot. Reportedly, the Emperor sustained two gunshot wounds: the first, a rifle shot to his arm, and shortly thereafter, a severe gunshot to his chest. Subsequently, he was transported to his tent, where he revealed that his nephew, Ras Mengesha, was in fact his biological son and declared him as his heir (his elder son Ras Araya Selassie had died a few years earlier). He died hours later. Although the Ethiopian army had almost annihilated their opponents in this battle, hearing that their ruler had been slain shattered their morale and they were scattered by the nearly beaten Sudanese army.

Yohannes's body was carried back to Tigray guarded by a small party, who were overtaken by the Mahdist troops of Zeki Tummal near the Atbara River, who captured the sovereign's body. Augustus B. Wylde, who claimed to have heard the story from a priest who managed to escape the slaughter, wrote how Yohannes' uncle Ras Araya Dimtsu stood beside the body of his dead master with "a few of his soldiers and the bravest of the king's servants, who had lost their all, and had no more prospects to live for".

Ras Araya was last seen standing alongside the box containing the king's body, after having expended all his ammunition, with his shield and sword in his hands, defending himself, till at last he was speared by a Dervish from behind, and died fighting gamely, "like the fine old warrior that he was".

According to Wylde, as he saw death come Ras Araya announced "that he was now old and done for, that his time had come, and it was useless at his age to serve another master that he knew little about, and it was better to die like a man fighting unbelievers, than like a mule in a stable." The Mahdists brought the Emperor's body back to their capital at Omdurman, where the head was put on a pike and paraded through the streets.

On 2 May of the same year 1889, Emperor Menelik signed then the Treaty of Wuchale with the Italians which later on led to the Battle of Adwa.

== Descendants ==
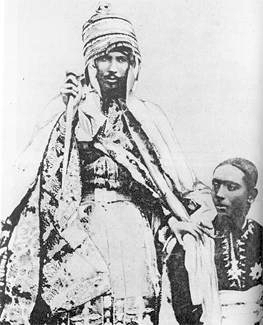
Photograph of Yohannes IV (left) with his son and heir, Araya Selassie Yohannes (right)

Although a group of Tigrean nobles led by Ras Alula attempted to promote the claim of Ras Mengesha Yohannes (the "natural" son of Yohannes) as Emperor, many of the dead monarch's other relatives on both the Enderta and Tembien sides of his family objected and went into open rebellion against Mengesha. Many refused to accept Ras Mengesha as the son of Yohannes, having long known him as his nephew. Tigray was torn assunder by the rebellions of various members of the Emperor's family against Mengesha and each other. Menelik of Shewa took advantage of Tigrean disorder, and after the Italians occupied Hamasien, (a district Yohannes IV had bestowed upon Ras Alula) he was proclaimed Emperor of Ethiopia as Menelik II. The death of Yohannes reduced the influence of Tigrayans in the Ethiopian government and opened the way for Italians to occupy more districts previously held by Tigrayan nobles. The seizures made by the Italians at this time ultimately resulted in the creation of the colony of Eritrea and the defeat of Italy at the Battle of Adwa at the hands of Emperor Menelik II. The Tigrean nobility retained influence at the Imperial court of Menelik and his successors, although not at the level they enjoyed under Yohannes IV. The descendants of Yohannes ruled Tigray as hereditary Princes until the Ethiopian Revolution and the fall of the monarchy in 1974 ended their rule.

=== Araya Selassie Yohannes ===
There are two lines of descent from Yohannes IV, one "legitimate" and one "natural." The legitimate line is through his elder son, Ras Araya Selassie Yohannes. Araya Selassie Yohannes was born to his wife Wolete Selassie. The son of Araya Selassie Yohannes was Ras Gugsa Araya Selassie. His son was the infamous Dejazmach Haile Selassie Gugsa who governed eastern Tigray in the 1930s and was married to Emperor Haile Selassie's daughter Princess Zenebework Haile Selassie. However, following the death of his wife, Dejazmatch Haile Selassie Gugsa's relationship with Emperor Haile Selassie deteriorated, and in 1936, Dejazmatch Haile Selassie became the first high-ranking Ethiopian nobleman to defect to the Italians when the Fascist forces invaded Ethiopia. The people of Mekelle ransacked his house when this news was revealed. He was elevated to the title of Ras by the King of Italy. However, following the liberation of Ethiopia in 1941, Haile Selassie Gugsa was placed under house arrest and regarded as a traitor. Emperor Haile Selassie refused to acknowledge the title of Ras granted to his former son-in-law by the King of Italy, and so he reverted to the title of Dejazmatch. He was freed by the Derg regime in 1974 following the fall of the monarchy. He died shortly thereafter. There are other descendants of Emperor Yohannes IV in this "legitimate" line, but because of the wartime actions of Dejazmatch Haile Selassie Gugsa, this branch of the family fell into disfavor at the Imperial court and lost its position and influence.

=== Mengesha Yohannes ===
The second, "natural" line is through Ras Mengesha Yohannes and is the better-known line. Although Ras Mengesha Yohannes ended his days under house arrest for his repeated rebelling against Emperor Menelik II. Ras Mengesha's son Ras Seyoum Mengesha first became governor of western Tigray, and following the treason of his cousin Dejazmatch Haile Selassie Gugsa, became Governor (Shum) of all of Tigray in 1936. He commanded troops against the Italians, but was forced to surrender and spent most of the Italian occupation under house arrest in Addis Ababa. Following the return of Emperor Haile Selassie in 1941, Ras Seyoum was restored to his governorate of Tigray, recognized as the hereditary Prince of that province. Ras Seyoum Mengesha was killed during the abortive coup by the Imperial Bodyguard in 1960 and was succeeded by his son Ras Mengesha Seyoum who served as Governor and hereditary Prince of Tigray until the 1974 Revolution toppled the Ethiopian monarchy. Ras Mengesha Seyoum is married to Princess Aida Desta, a granddaughter of Emperor Haile Selassie and is the current head of the Tigrean nobility. Mengesha Seyoum is the last person alive today who bears the title of Leul Ras.

== Legacy ==
A nobleman by birth, a cleric by education, a zealot by faith, moralist by tendency, a monk by practice, a nationalist by policy, and a soldier and emperor by profession

— Bairu Tafla, Chronicle of Yohannes, Introduction

Yohannes undoubtedly had his weaknesses; they were not his own making, but rather imposed on him either by external pressure or inherited by his deep-seated values and traditional norms. During the eighteen years of his reign, he was preoccupied with defending his country against external aggressions perpetrated by the Egyptians, the Italians, and the Mahdists. Yohannes succeeded to a large extent in pacifying the country and expanding the empire by the device of power-sharing and accommodation. Guiding principles of his administration were patience, tolerance, and forgiveness, as well as a tendency to preserve the status quo. Above all, his concerns were focused on promoting peace rather than his own personal or dynastic gain.

The way he shared his authority with Menelik and Tekle Haymanot eventually resulted in undermining his own authority, but it contributed greatly to accelerating the process of reunification of the Ethiopian Empire. By preserving the status quo in the regional administration, the uncertainty and fear which were prevalent under previous reigns due to constant changes were reduced. The self-confidence and charitable attitude he displayed toward his vanquished enemies and rivals earned him the high esteem of his subjects.

Early in his career after he defeated and seized Dejazmatch Gabre Mikael of Seraye, who was responsible for the death of his own mother Woizero Silas Dimtsu, not only did he forgive him, but within a year, Gabre Mikael was reinstated as councilor and appeared as one of the important dignitaries during the mission of Major Grant to Adwa, in February 1868. Subsequently, Gabre Mikael's son, Dejazmach Birru, also held important posts. Ras Adal of Gojjam, after he killed his own cousin, Ras Desta Tedla Gualu, the newly appointed governor by Yohannes and submitted to Yohannes and asked for forgiveness, not only was he forgiven but he was given the command over Gojjam and eventually elevated as King of Gojjam and Keffa, under the name of Tekle Haymanot.

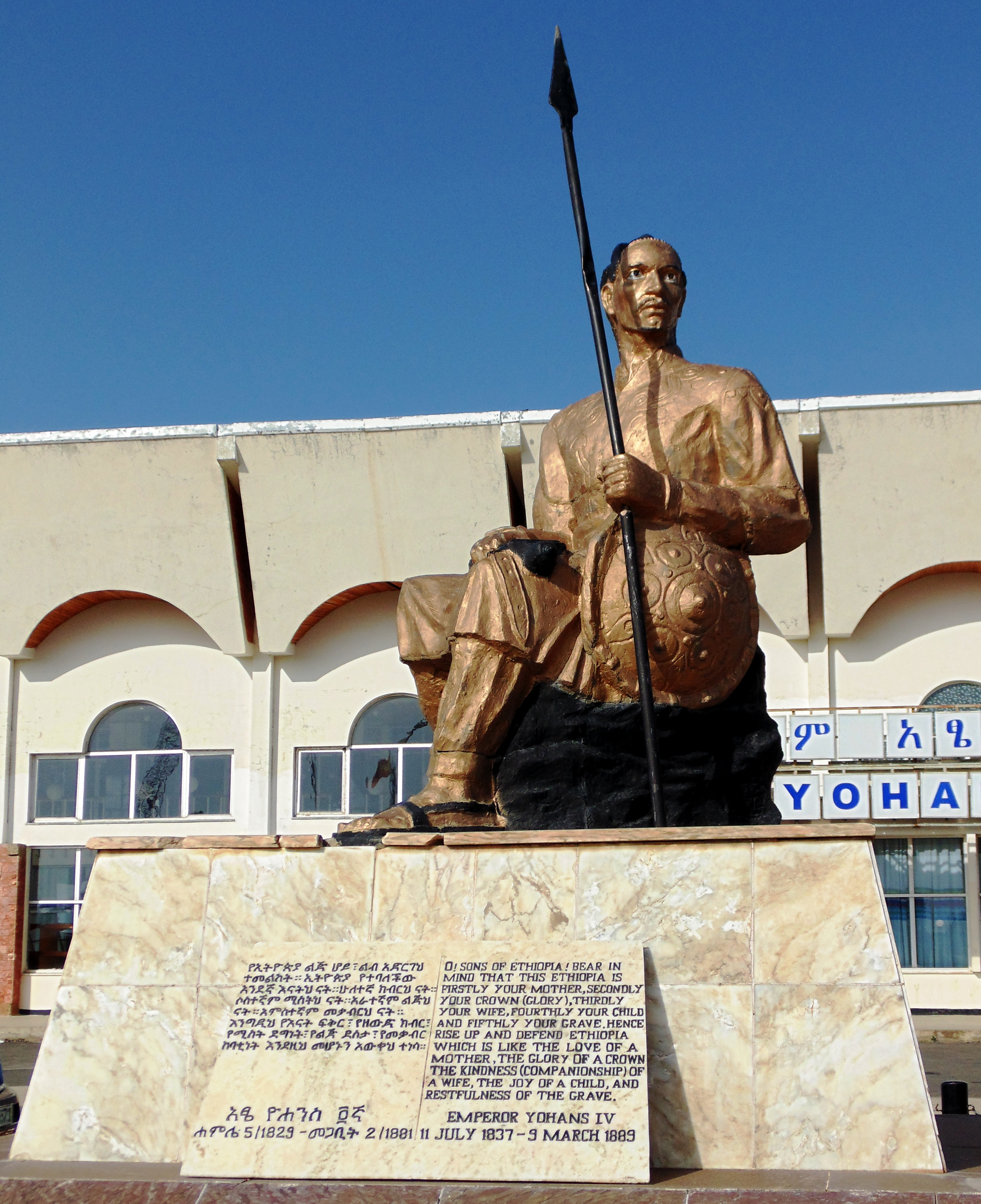
Yohannes' monument in Axum, Tigray, Ethiopia

King Menelik's ambition to seize the imperial crown was clearly evident since his escape from Mäqdalä and return to Shoa, in 1865. The submission of Menelik to Yohannes was not effected until 1878 after Yohannes gained substantial advantage over his rivals in terms of quality and quantity of firearms as a result of the booty gathered in his successive victories over the Egyptian army at Gundet and Gurae, in 1875 and 1876, respectively. This advantage remained on Yohannes's side throughout his reign. Despite repeated pressure from his advisers on two occasions, in 1878, at the time of Menelik's submission and in 1881, after his two vassal kings, Menelik and Teklé Haymanot fought against each other at Embabo, to remove Menelik and replace him if need be, by one of his cousins, such as Meshesha Seifu, Yohannes refused to yield on grounds that he was not going to destroy an effective power, which Menelik diligently built up for the sake of eliminating a possible threat to himself. Finally, Yohannes heard that both his vassal kings have defected and during his campaign in Gojjam, Tekle Haymant confessed that they had concluded an agreement to help one another and rebel against the authority of the Emperor. At this juncture, the temptation was great to cross the Abbay River (Blue Nile) to Showan territory and eliminate the internal threat. Yohannes's priority, however, was to avert the external threat and he decided to face the Mahdists who had penetrated twice as far as Gonder and burnt the churches, pillaged the country, and enslaved people.

Throughout his reign, Yohannes demonstrated selfless devotion to the defense of the territorial integrity of Ethiopian Empire against successive waves of external aggression, by Egyptians, Italians, and Mahdists Sudan. He also strove within the parameters of what was possible in his day to promote the welfare of his people. His devotion to his country and people culminated in the supreme sacrifice of his life at the border of his empire, in the Battle of Metemma.

== Full title ==
"His Imperial Majesty John IV, Conquering Lion of the Tribe of Judah, za'imnaggada yīhūda, nigūsa TSion, nigūsa nagast za'ītyōṗṗyā, siyūma 'igzī'a'bihēr").

Yohannes IV Solomonic dynasty Born: 11 July 1837 Died: 10 March 1889
Regnal titles
| Preceded by Tekle Giyorgis II | Emperor of Ethiopia; 1871–1889 | Succeeded by Menelik II |
