= Battle of Gura =

1876 battle between the Ethiopian Empire and Khedivate of Egypt

- Part of Ethiopian–Egyptian War
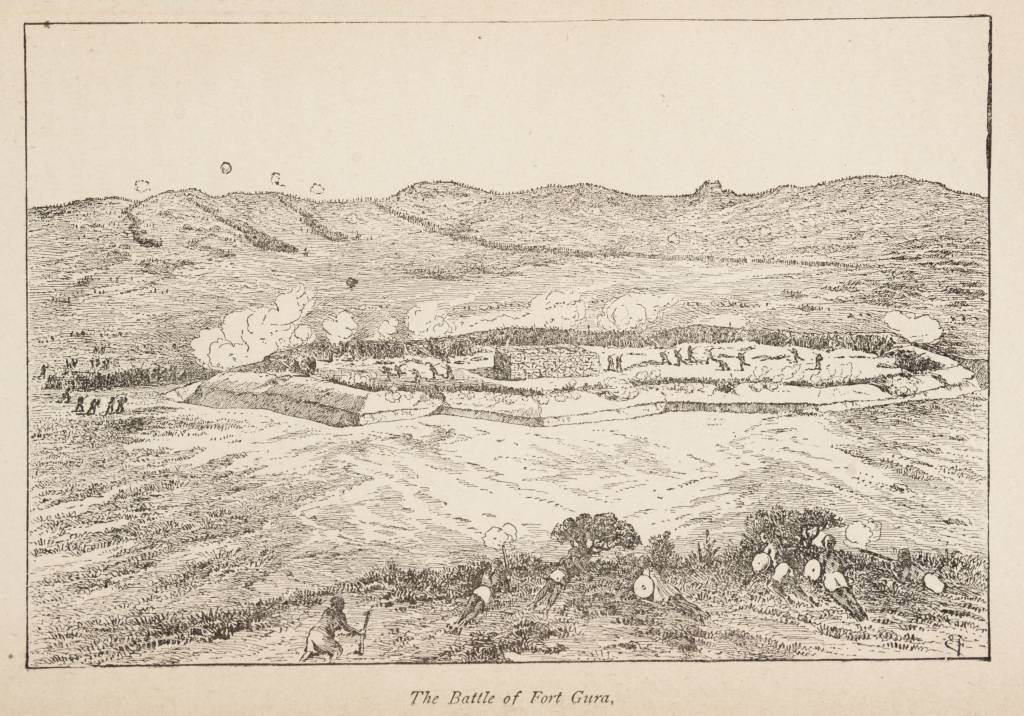
- Depiction of the Battle of Gura
Date	7–10 March 1876 (2 days)
Location	Gura, Akele Guzay, Ethiopian Empire
Result	Ethiopian victory

Belligerents
Khedivate of Egypt	Ethiopian Empire

Commanders and leaders
Ratib Pasha; William Wing Loring; Uthman Rifqi	(Ethiopian Empire) Yohannes IV (Ethiopian Empire) Shaleqa Alula (Ethiopian Empire) Abuna Atnatewos (DOW)

Strength
13,000	estimated 50,000 in total but only 20,000 in battle

Casualties and losses
~3,200 killed 2,000 captured	1,800 killed

The Battle of Gura was fought on 7–10 March 1876 between the Ethiopian Empire and the Khedivate of Egypt near the town of Gura in Akele Guzai. It was the second and decisive major battle of the Ethiopian–Egyptian War.

== Background ==
In December 1875, a local ruler of Hamasien, Woldemichael Solomon, submitted to the Egyptians at Massawa. This allowed the Egyptians to occupy the entire province with minimal resistance.

After the defeat at Gundet, the Egyptians sent a much larger, well-armed force to attempt a second invasion. This army moved to Gura plain, and made two forts there: "Gura" fort and "Khaya Khor" fort. Gura fort was garrisoned by 7,500 men led by Muhammad Rateb Pasha and ex Confederate general William Wing Loring and Khaya Khor fort was garrisoned by 5,500 men led by Uthman Rifqi. Isma'il Pasha attached his son Hassan Ismail Pasha to the expedition. Yohannes soon arrived in the area with a huge army of over 50,000 men mobilized from the provinces of Tigray, Gojjam and Wollo.

Taking advantage of the lack of Egyptian reconnaissance, the Ethiopians positioned themselves on the Godolfelassie road, Yohannes could now strike Gura, Khaya Khor or Keren. Fearing an attack on the supply depots, Rateb Pasha decided to send 5,000 out of his 7,500 strong force to attack the Ethiopian army, believing that dug-in Egyptian forces were unbeatable by enemies who did not possess artillery, such as the Abyssinians. The 5,000 strong Egyptian infantry of Gura fort sortied out early on March 7.

== Battle ==
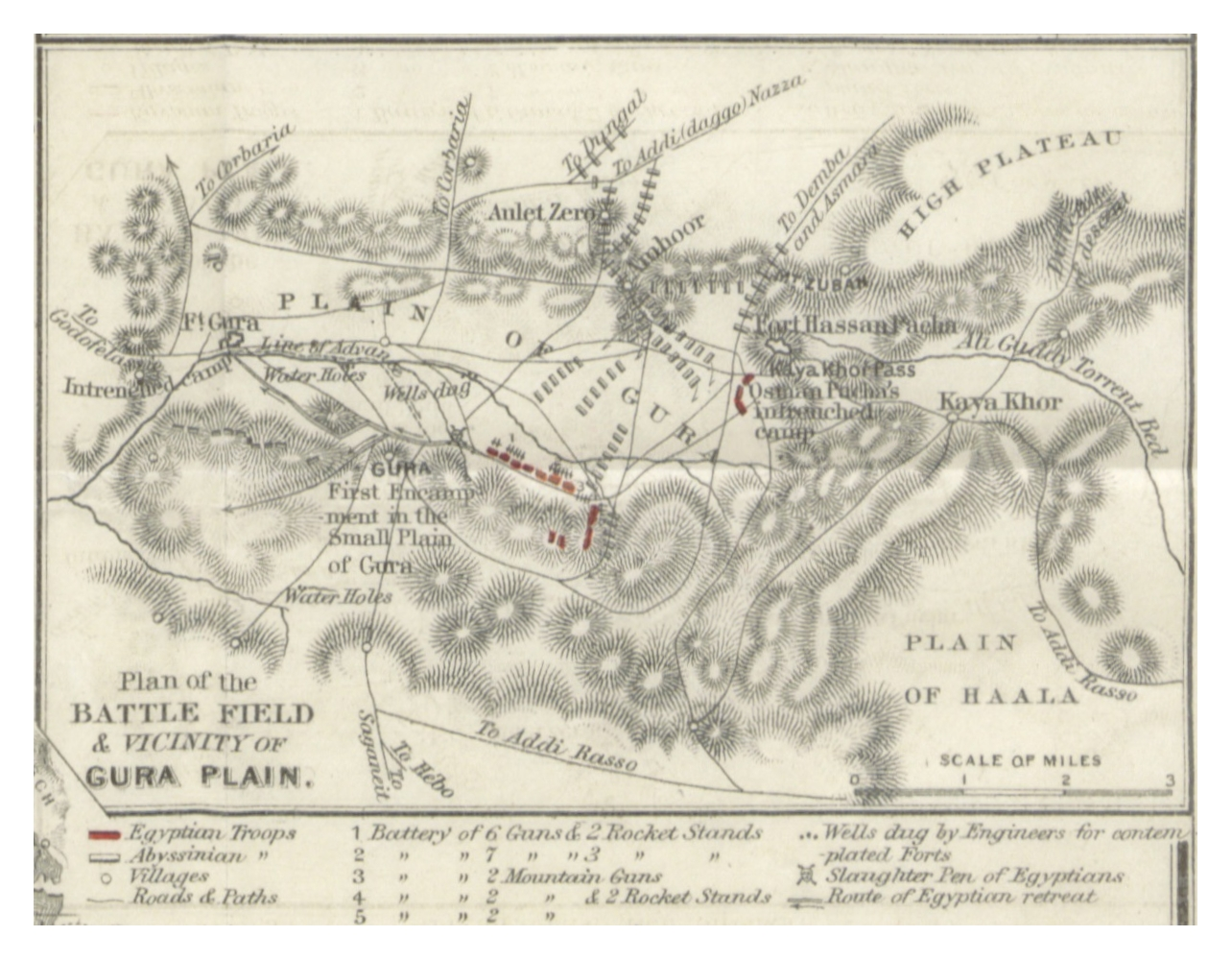
1880 map of the battle

On March 7, the Egyptians that left the fort were attacked by the Ethiopians and surrounded. Most of the Ethiopians were armed with firearms, and although they had only one field-gun, it is said to have had no effect in deciding the action. The accounts of the American officers are silent on the point; but it is said that Muhammad Rateb Pasha allowed his views to be overruled by Loring Pasha, who insisted on the ramps of the trenches which had been erected being razed, so that the artillery could have a clear zone of fire.

The Egyptian troops had no time to prepare or coordinate a defense, and the battle turned into a disorderly escape of the Egyptian troops from the attacking Ethiopians which devastated the brigade. According to Lockett out of the 5,000 Egyptians that sortied out only a few hundred managed to return to the fort. Uthman Rifqi and his garrison of 5,500 men viewed the entire engagement from their fort at Khaya Khor but decided not to join the battle.

The Ethiopians followed up their success, and launched a large scale attack on the two forts on the 8th and 9 March, but was repelled with heavy losses on both sides. The Ethiopians then withdrew to loot the dead and collect the rifles which the Egyptian troops had abandoned. Most of the artillery was lost, as well as considerable quantities of rifle ammunition.

== Aftermath ==
After the withdrawal of the Ethiopians, the angered Egyptians left their forts and burned the wounded enemies alive. The Ethiopians retaliated by a cold-blooded massacre of about 600 Egyptian prisoners whom they had taken. Among these prisoners killed were Dr. Muhammad Ali Pasha and Neghib Bey Muhammad. Dr Badr (who had been educated in Edinburgh) escaped by the assistance of an Ethiopian girl who discovered him wounded. On March 12, an amnesty was arranged, and Monsieur Sarzac (the French consul at Massawa) went over the battlefield where the survivors of the Egyptian army were collected, and reached Massawa in May.

Subsequently, the Egyptian government tried, for some time, to conceal the news of the defeat. Yet, at Gura over 3,200 Egyptians were killed and more than 2,000 were captured, which necessitated negotiations for their release. Although some new forces were dispatched to Massawa after the battle, Egypt could not afford to fight with Ethiopia. Yohannes, in his turn, did not want the continuation of the hostilities. Even though the peace treaty was only signed in 1884 (Hewett treaty), Egypt was never again to attempt to conquer parts of Emperor Yohannes's realm. The victory helped Emperor Yohannes solidify his control over the Ethiopian Empire broadly, and control over the Mareb Melash specifically. He would appoint then Shaleqa Alula as the Ras of those areas of this region under imperial authority.

== See also ==
- Ethiopian–Egyptian War
- Battle of Adwa
- Military history of Ethiopia
