= John Kirkham (adventurer) =

British adventurer (1835–1876)

John Charles Kirkham (c. 1835 – June 1876) was a British adventurer, hotelier and ship's steward who fought beside William Walker in Nicaragua and Charles George Gordon in China during the Taiping Rebellion before landing in Ethiopia at the beginning of the British Expedition to Abyssinia against Emperor Tewodros II in 1868. At the conclusion of the latter campaign, Kirkham stayed in the country and became the main Western advisor to Emperor Yohannes IV. He was instrumental in training Ethiopian troops to Western military standards, raising and drilling what became known as the Emperor's Disciplined Force.

Kirkham's troops played a major role in the defeat of the 1871 invasion of Tigray by Yohannes's rival for the Ethiopian crown, Emperor Tekle Giyorgis II (Wagshum Gobeze), fighting with conspicuous success in the Battle of Adwa on 11 July. Thereafter Kirkham was sent by Yohannes on a diplomatic mission to Europe to help attract recognition and support for his imperial regime. He visited London and possibly also Paris and Vienna on the Emperor's behalf, returning via Massawa in February 1873.

In recognition of Kirkham's abilities and services, Yohannes promoted his advisor – who had once kept a hotel at Tientsin and had arrived in the country as a ship's steward with the P&O Line – to the rank of general and gave him a substantial estate at Asmara, then in the province of Tigray, and near the Egyptian frontier. Kirkham was later made governor of that province.

Kirkham's men fought again during the invasion of Ethiopia by Egypt that began in October 1875. They played a part in an initial skirmish at Kesad-Ikka, but Kirkham was late arriving at the critical Battle of Gundet next day (16 November 1875). This battle saw the decisive defeat of the Egyptian army commanded by the Danish adventurer Colonel Arrendrup by Yohannes's general Ras Alula Engida. Kirkham's failure to reach the battle site in time to take part in the fighting cost him much of his prestige, some Ethiopian officers describing him as "an old woman" for his dilatoriness.

Sent on a second mission to Europe in December 1875, Kirkham was captured attempting to cross Egyptian lines and was sent to Massawa, where he was kept imprisoned in a large cage normally used to hold lions. His captors gave him little or no food, but copious amounts of alcohol to drink, with the intention that he be "compelled to feed upon the insects on his body." Kirkham was discovered in his cage by a party of British sailors landed from the gunboat HMS Teazer, one of whom described him as ragged, half-naked and starving. The sailors wished to free him, but upon enquiry via cable to London, the naval party was informed that Kirkham had sacrificed the right to British protection by taking service with Yohannes. He was left in his cage.

Kirkham eventually developed delirium tremens as a result of his treatment by the Egyptians and was taken to the Lutheran mission in Massawa for treatment. He died there, of alcohol poisoning and dysentery, in the middle of June 1876, six months after his capture.

Kirkham's military abilities were praised by Gordon, who described him as "an officer (there being but few others) in whom I could place implicit trust." He was, however, wounded twice, severely, in the head during the latter stages of the Taiping Rebellion, after which his personality and military capacity are said to have changed sharply for the worse.

Kirkham was visited, at his home in Ethiopia, by Dermot Bourke, the Earl of Mayo, in January 1875. Bourke described him as "a fair, rather good-looking, slim man" who was shabbily dressed in "an undress general's uniform with a large sword clanking by his side" and thin old button boots "which were rather trying to his poor feet on the rocks." A few months later, after his capture, Kirkham was seen by the former Confederate General William Loring, who had taken service with the Egyptians, and described as "utterly used up by disease and dissipation", wearing an ancient and much-patched British military uniform, and being very indignant that his nationality and British passport were being ignored.
