= Hewett Treaty =

1884 treaty between Britain, Egypt, and Ethiopia

The Hewett Treaty, also called the Treaty of Adwa, was an agreement between Britain, Egypt (Note: Although still technically a province of the Ottoman Empire, since the Anglo-Egyptian War of 1882, Egypt had been under British occupation. It was de facto an autonomous state under British protection.) and Ethiopia signed at Adwa on 3 June 1884. The treaty ended a long-simmering conflict between Egypt and Ethiopia, but indirectly started a new conflict between Ethiopia and Italy (Italo-Ethiopian War of 1887–1889), along with Ethiopia's involvement in the Mahdist War. It had seven articles.

The terms of the treaty were negotiated at Asmara, in the northern reaches of the Ethiopian empire, by Mason Bey for Egypt, Admiral William Hewett for Britain and Ras Alula, also acting as host, for Ethiopia. Once terms had been agreed, the party moved to Adwa, where the treaty was presented to Emperor Yohannes IV of Ethiopia. The emperor demanded a seaport for Ethiopia, but later compromised. The final treaty represented compromise with the Anglo-Egyptians.

The first article of the treaty provided that Ethiopia would have free transit for all goods, including arms, through the port of Massawa. Britain undertook to protect this right. In the second article, Egypt promised to return Bogos, occupied since 1868, to Ethiopian control. In the third article, Ethiopia agreed to assist the evacuation of Egyptian troops from Kassala, Amadid and Senhit. In the fourth article, Egypt agreed to permit the passage of newly appointed Abunas (Note: The Abuna is the head of the Ethiopian Orthodox Tewahedo Church and was appointed by the Coptic Patriarch of Alexandria in Egypt prior to 1959.) to Ethiopia. In the fifth article, Egypt and Ethiopia agreed to the extradition of criminals. In the sixth article, Ethiopia agreed to accept British arbitration in any case of disagreement with Egypt over the terms of the treaty.

Shortly after its ratification, the Italians occupied Massawa, which had been evacuated by Egypt, with tacit British approval.
