= List of holders of the Bahr Negash title =

Bahr Negash ("Ruler of the Sea") was the title used to refer to the rulers of Medri Bahri, the northernmost province of the Ethiopian Empire, from an early precursor form in the 12th century until the office was abolished after the Italian occupation in 1890. The list below comprises all the confirmed holders of this office, as well as those only vaguely mentioned.

== Precursor titles (Zagwe and early Solomonic periods) ==
Before the title bahér nägaš was formally established, the office is attested under two earlier names: baḥǝr nägaśi (used once, in the Zagwe period) and maýékälä bahér ("the middle of the coast"), the latter known from a series of land charters preserved in the "Golden Gospels" of Däbrä Libanos of Šémäzana.

Name	Approximate date	Notes
(unnamed)	12th century	Earliest known attestation of the title baḥǝr nägaśi itself ("viceroy of the coast"), in a land grant of the Zagwe king Ṭänṭäwǝdǝm to the church of ʿUra Mäsqäl, alongside officers of ʿAgamä, Bur, and Säraye.
(unnamed)	1225	Earliest attestation of the (related) title maýékälä bahér, in a charter of Emperor Lalibela.
Yagbəʾa Séyon	fl. 1270–85	Named in a charter from the reign of Yekuno Amlak.
Mahśänt	fl. 1299–1314	Probable successor to Yagbəʾa Séyon; attested in a charter contemporary with Wedem Ar'ad.
Gäbru	1305	Attested in a dated charter.
Sämay	fl. 1314–44	Attested in a land grant of Amda Seyon I.
Bahrä Asgäd	1328	Son of Amda Seyon I; appointed to a centralized administration over Tigré that for the first time combined the maritime provinces with the title maýékälä bahér.
(unnamed)	c. mid-15th century	Zara Yaqob (r. 1434–68) grouped the districts of Shiré, Seraye, Hamasén, and Bur under a single administration entrusted to the Bahr Nagash, one year before he began building his own port at Girar opposite Massawa. (Note: Tamrat cites Les Chroniques de Zar'a Ya'iqob et de Ba'eda Maryam (ed./tr. Perruchon), pp. 47–8.)

== 15th–17th century ==
Name	Approximate date	Notes
Zäkaryas	fl. 1489–92	Sheltered a fugitive Ethiopian officer (the future éccäge ʿĔnbāqom) during the reign of Eskender.
"Adiby" (Adäbabay)	fl. 1520	Received the Portuguese embassy of Rodrigo de Lima and Diogo Lopes at Massawa.
Dori	fl. 1520s	Uncle of Lebna Dengel; visited by Francisco Alvares.
Bulla	fl. c. 1520s	Son of Dori; succeeded as a child of ten to twelve on his father's death, but was recalled to court and replaced within a short time by a nobleman.
Ros Näbiyat (Port. "Arraz Anobiata")	c. 1524–26	Béht wäddäd "of the right" under Lebna Dengel; appointed bahér nägaš c. 1524, held office ~2 years.
ʿAbbas b. Abuñ b. Ibrahim	fl. 1532	Nephew of Ahmad ibn Ibrahim al-Ghazi; granted the title by Ahmad after conquering Seraye and killing its governor Täsfa Le'ul.
Zä-Wangel	c. 1529–35	Killed during the Ethiopian–Adal War.
Yeshaq	c. 1541–78	Long-serving and most prominent holder of the title; defeated and killed in 1578.
Yeshaq Wäldä Ézum (Wad Ezum)	fl. 1589	Ottoman-installed rival bahér nägaš from Hamasen; captured and killed by Särsä Déngél.
Däragot	fl. 1587–88	Held both tégre mäkwännén and bahér nägaš; routed by Ottoman forces near Debarwa in 1587/88.
Aqwébä/Aquba Mikael	fl. 1589–90	Appointed after distinguishing himself against the Turks; later honoured as "Son of the King."
Kəflä Wahéd	fl. 1597–1608	Held both tégre mäkwännén and bahér nägaš after Särsä Déngél's death.
Se'ela Krestos	fl. 1608–09	Half-brother of Susenyos I; held both titles, gave them up amid Tigrayan popular resistance.
Amsalä Kréstos	fl. 1609	Appointed after Se'ela Krestos's removal.
Yolyos	fl. c. 1613	Appointed to both offices.
Dəlbä Iyäsus	fl. 1619	Held bahér nägaš while Täklä Giyorgis held tégre mäkwännén separately. Rebelled and was defeated
Täklä Giyorgis	fl. c. 1628–29	Took both tégre mäkwännén and bahér nägaš; rebelled against Susényos in 1628–29 over support for the Jesuit mission; captured and executed at Gännätä Iyäsus.
Yohannəs (based between Débarwa and Massawa)	fl. 1628–29	Bahér nägaš allied with rebel Täklä Giyorgis.
Gäbrä Maryam	fl 1628-29	Allied with rebel Täklä Giyorgis in 1628–29; an earlier holder of the same name was sent to subdue Queen Fatima in Sudan in 1619 and lost the title to Täklä Giyorgis (possibly the same man).
ʾAmdä Mikaʾel	fl. 1628–29	Rival bahér nägaš who disputed Täklä Giyorgis's power within Tigray and sided with Susényos against him.
Asmä Giyorgis	fl. 1629	Given the combined office.
"Joanes Acay" and "Aradon"	fl. 1630s	Two brothers, both styled bahér nägaš simultaneously.
Yohannés Hakkay (of Seraye)	(fl. 1632–67)	Patron of the church of Énda Abunä Täklä Haymanot (Wägariqo).
Hab Sellus	fl. 1663/64–1704	Governor of Bambolo Méllaš (and, after killing his wife, the reduced Märäb Méllaš). (Note: "he possibly was later promoted to the rank of bahér nägaš of Débarwa, cp. KolTrad III, A18, A36". The claim is explicitly hedged, not confirmed.)
Gäbrä Kréstos Habíéllus	fl. 1693–1713	Son and co-governor of Hab Sellus over Bambolo Méllaš/Märäb Méllaš. (Note: he was called bahér nägaš in EA's "Bambolo Méllaš" entry, though his own dedicated entry gives only däggazmaó; the title usage is inconsistent across EA's own entries. Compare Uhlig, Siegbert (2005). Encyclopaedia Aethiopica: Volume 2: D-Ha. p. 461. ("bahér nägaš ÷Gäbrä Kréstos") with his own dedicated entry at p. 618, which gives only däggazmaó.)

== 18th–20th century ==
Name	Approximate date	Notes
ʿAndä Haymanot	fl. 1729–59 (d. 15 November 1759)	Fourth son of Gäbrä Kréstos Habíéllus; his first title was explicitly bahér nägaš (per an 18th-c. inscription) before he succeeded his brother Mammo as governor of the larger Bambolo Méllaš. Deposed and executed by Mikael Sehul of Tigray. There is a oral tradition which even calls him néguś bambolo məllaš
Solomon Täsfa Séyon	fl. c. 1731–43 (trad. 12 years)	Bahri Nägaśi of the Märäb Méllaš under Iyasu II; grandson of Gäbrä Kréstos Habíéllus, seated at Säʿazzäga. Apparently deputy of his uncle ʿAndä Haymanot. Fought Mikael Sehul (then his own officer) to a draw at ʿÉdaga Räbuʿ; the two reconciled, with Solomon keeping Märäb Méllaš and Mikael Sehul taking Tigray.
Boḵru Sälomon	fl. 1743–76 (d. 17 October 1776)	Son of Solomon Täsfa Séyon; took over the office and title of däggazmaó on his father's death, ruling jointly with his granduncle ʿAndä Haymanot before being confirmed Bahri Nägaśi of Débarwa in his own right. Deprived of his government c. 1760–70/71, reinstated after the arrest of Ras Mikael Sehul, but ultimately had to accept Mikael Sehul's suzerainty.
Kəflä Täḵlit (of ʿAd Täõlay)	c. 1750s–60s	Bahri Nägaśi; rival cousin of Booru Solomon who seized the title while Booru was away collecting tribute from the Mänsaʿ. Defeated and fled to Seraye after a battle near Daqqi Senʿa; Booru later recovered the office.
Täsfa Séyon	fl. 1776-91	Second son of Booru Solomon; inherited his father's office, retaining it despite a rival claim from his elder half-brother Gäbrä Kréstos, who fled to Amhara until Täsfa Séyon's death some 15 years later.
Gäbrat	18th c.	Bahri Nägaśi; great-great-grandfather of Ras Wäldä Mikaýel Solomon (d. 1906).
Ezar (Habab leader, Sahél)	d. c. 1790	Granted the title purely as an honorific by the emperor, the only 18th-century instance of an emperor personally appointing a bahér nägaš.
Gʷəradä Zarʿay	d. 1866	Moved the seat of the office to Asmara. Uncle of Abbay Habtä Séyon.
Habtäsen Wäldä Gabär	fl. 1850s–88	Bahér nägaš of Saharti, son-in-law of Hamasen leader Haylu Täwäldä Mädhén; confirmed by Tewodros II and Yohannes IV; deposed by Ras Alula in 1888.
Godäfay (of Guraʾ)	January 1876	Submitted, with his 14 villages, to the Egyptians, precipitating the Battle of Gura.
Täsfa Maryam (of Saʿəsəʿ)	fl. 1870s	Led Yohannes IV's troops against rebel Säbagadis Araya in ʿAgamä, but was captured by him. In response, Yohannes IV looted the countryside, burning down Catholic churches and missionary residences.
Féqrä Iyäsus Assäcäq	19th c.	Saho Bahri Nägaśi of the Sän'adäglä group in Akkele Guzai; sheltered Justin de Jacobis when he fled Tewodros II; expanded authority to Hergigo.
Gäbrit of Korbarya	c. 1902	Set forth a revision of the customary law (Statute of May ʿAdgi) for the Éggäla.
Abbay Habtä Séyon	fl. late 19th–early 20th c. (b. 1869, d. 29 Jan. 1914)	One of the last to formally hold the title; officially promoted by the Italians; inherited the office from his uncle Gwérade Zarýay.

== Sources ==
- Bustorf, Dirk (2005). "ŸÉnbaqom". Encyclopaedia Aethiopica: Volume 2: D-Ha. Harrassowitz Verlag.
- Derat, Marie-Laure (2020). "Before the Solomonids: Crisis, Renaissance and the Emergence of the Zagwe Dynasty (Seventh–Thirteenth Centuries)". In Samantha Kelly (ed.). A Companion to Medieval Ethiopia and Eritrea. Brill.
- Nosnitsin, Denis (2007). "Maýékälä bahér". Encyclopaedia Aethiopica: Volume 3: He-N. Harrassowitz Verlag.
- Pankhurst, Richard (1961). An Introduction to the Economic History of Ethiopia. Lalibela House.
- Pankhurst, Richard (1997). The Ethiopian Borderlands. Red Sea Press.
- Smidt, Wolbert (2003). "Anda Haymanot". Encyclopaedia Aethiopica: Volume 1: A-C. Harrassowitz Verlag.
- Smidt, Wolbert (2003). "Bahér nägaš in the 18th to 20th centuries". Encyclopaedia Aethiopica: Volume 1: A-C. Harrassowitz Verlag.
- Smidt, Wolbert (2003). "Boõru Sälomon". Encyclopaedia Aethiopica: Volume 1: A-C. Harrassowitz Verlag.
- Smidt, Wolbert (2007). "Hab Sellus". Encyclopaedia Aethiopica: Volume 3: He-N. Harrassowitz Verlag.
- Smidt, Wolbert (2010). "Sälomon Täsfa Séyon". Encyclopaedia Aethiopica: Volume 4: O-X. Harrassowitz Verlag.
- Smidt, Wolbert (2010). "Tégre mäkwännén". Encyclopaedia Aethiopica: Volume 4: O-X. Harrassowitz Verlag.
- Tamrat, Taddesse (1972). Church and State in Ethiopia 1270–1527. Oxford: Clarendon Press.
- Toubkis, Dimitri (2010). "Takla Giyorgis". Encyclopaedia Aethiopica: Volume 4: O-X. Harrassowitz Verlag.
- Uhlig, Siegbert (2003). Encyclopaedia Aethiopica: Volume 1: A-C.
- Uhlig, Siegbert (2005). Encyclopaedia Aethiopica: Volume 2: D-Ha. Harrassowitz Verlag.
- Uhlig, Siegbert (2007). Encyclopaedia Aethiopica: Volume 3: He-N.
- Uhlig, Siegbert (2010). Encyclopaedia Aethiopica: Volume 4: O–X. Harrassowitz Verlag.
