= List of elevation extremes by region =

The following three sortable tables list land surface elevation extremes by region.

Elevation is the vertical distance above the reference geoid, an equipotential gravitational surface model of the Earth's sea level.

== Table of elevation extremes by geographic region ==
Land surface elevation extremes by geographic region
Geographic region	Highest point	Maximum elevation	Lowest point	Minimum elevation	Elevation span
⦁ Eurasia	Mount Everest, China and Nepal	8848 m 29,029 ft	Dead Sea, Israel, Jordan, and Palestine	−428 m −1,404 ft	9,276 m 30,433 ft
⦁ Asia	Mount Everest, China and Nepal	8848 m 29,029 ft	Dead Sea, Israel, Jordan, and Palestine	−428 m −1,404 ft	9,276 m 30,433 ft
⦁ Japanese Archipelago	Mount Fuji, Honshū, Japan	3776 m 12,388 ft	Hachiro-gata, Honshū, Japan	−4 m −13 ft	3780 m 12,402 ft
⦁ Malay Archipelago	Gunung Kinabalu, Borneo, Malaysia	4095 m 13,435 ft	South China Sea and Indian Ocean	sea level	4095 m 13,435 ft
⦁ Philippine Archipelago	Mount Apo, Mindanao, Philippines	2954 m 9,692 ft	Philippine Sea and South China Sea	sea level	2954 m 9,692 ft
⦁ Sri Lanka	Pidurutalagala, Sri Lanka	2524 m 8,281 ft	Indian Ocean	sea level	2524 m 8,281 ft
⦁ Europe	Mount Elbrus, Russia	5642 m 18,510 ft	Caspian Sea, Russia, et al.	−28 m −92 ft	5670 m 18,602 ft
⦁ British Isles	Ben Nevis, Great Britain, Scotland, UK	1343 m 4,406 ft	The Fens, Great Britain, England, UK	−4 m −13 ft	1347 m 4,419 ft
⦁ Africa	Kilimanjaro, Tanzania	5892 m 19,331 ft	Lake Assal, Djibouti	−155 m −509 ft	6047 m 19,839 ft
⦁ Madagascar	Maromokotro, Madagascar	2876 m 9,436 ft	Indian Ocean	sea level	2876 m 9,436 ft
⦁ Americas	Aconcagua, Argentina	6960 m 22,835 ft	Laguna del Carbón, Argentina	−105 m −344 ft	7065 m 23,179 ft
⦁ North America	Denali, Alaska, United States	6190.5 m 20,310 ft	Badwater Basin, California, United States	−85.0 m −279 ft	6275.5 m 20,589 ft
⦁ Northern America	Denali, Alaska, United States	6190.5 m 20,310 ft	Badwater Basin, California, United States	−85.0 m −279 ft	6275.5 m 20,589 ft
⦁ Greenland	Gunnbjørn Fjeld, Greenland	3700 m 12,139 ft	Arctic Ocean and North Atlantic Ocean	sea level	3700 m 12,139 ft
⦁ Mesoamerica	Volcán Citlaltépetl (Pico de Orizaba) (Note: The summit of Volcán Citlaltépetl (Pico de Orizaba) is the seventh-most prominent point on Earth.)	5636 m 18,491 ft	Laguna Salada	−10 m −33 ft	5646 m 18,524 ft
⦁ Central America	Volcán Tajumulco, Guatemala	4220 m 13,845 ft	North Pacific Ocean and Caribbean	sea level	4220 m 13,845 ft
⦁ Caribbean	Pico Duarte, Hispaniola, Dominican Republic	3098 m 10,164 ft	Lago Enriquillo, Hispaniola, Dominican Republic	−45 m −148 ft	3143 m 10,312 ft
⦁ South America	Aconcagua, Argentina	6960 m 22,835 ft	Laguna del Carbón, Argentina	−105 m −344 ft	7065 m 23,179 ft
⦁ Oceania	Puncak Jaya, Indonesia	4884 m 16,024 ft	Lake Eyre, Australia	−15 m −49 ft	4899 m 16,073 ft
⦁ Australasia	Aoraki / Mount Cook, New Zealand	3724 m 12,218 ft	Lake Eyre, Australia	−15 m −49 ft	3739 m 12,267 ft
⦁ Australia	Mount Kosciuszko, Australia	2228 m 7,310 ft	Lake Eyre, Australia	−15 m −49 ft	2243 m 7,359 ft
⦁ Melanesia	Puncak Jaya, New Guinea, Indonesia	4884 m 16,024 ft	Pacific Ocean	sea level	4884 m 16,024 ft
⦁ Micronesia	Mount Agrihan, Agrihan, Northern Mariana Islands	965 m 3,166 ft	Pacific Ocean	sea level	965 m 3,166 ft
⦁ Polynesia	Mauna Kea, Hawaii, United States	4207 m 13,802 ft	Taieri Plains, South Island, New Zealand	−2 m −7 ft	4209 m 13,809 ft
⦁ Antarctica	Mount Vinson, Antarctica	4892 m 16,050 ft	Southern Ocean	sea level	4892 m 16,050 ft
Earth	Mount Everest	8848 m 29,029 ft	Dead Sea	−428 m −1,404 ft	9,276 m 30,433 ft

== Table of elevation extremes by geographic zone ==
Land surface elevation extremes by geographic zone
Geographic zone	Highest point	Maximum elevation	Lowest point	Minimum elevation	Elevation span
Arctic	Gunnbjørn Fjeld, Greenland	3700 m 12,139 ft	Arctic Ocean	sea level	3700 m 12,139 ft
North Temperate Zone	Mount Everest, China and Nepal	8848 m 29,029 ft	Dead Sea, Israel, Jordan, and Palestine	−428 m −1,404 ft	9,276 m 30,433 ft
North Tropical Zone	Cayambe, Ecuador	5790 m 18,996 ft	Lake Assal, Djibouti	−155 m −509 ft	5945 m 19,505 ft
South Tropical Zone	Huáscarán, Peru	6768 m 22,205 ft	Bayóvar Depression, Peru	−34 m −112 ft	6802 m 22,316 ft
South Temperate Zone	Aconcagua, Argentina	6960 m 22,835 ft	Laguna del Carbón, Argentina	−105 m −344 ft	7065 m 23,179 ft
Antarctic	Mount Vinson, Antarctica	4892 m 16,050 ft	Southern Ocean	sea level	4892 m 16,050 ft

== Table of elevation extremes by geographic hemisphere ==
Land surface elevation extremes by geographic hemisphere
Geographic hemisphere	Highest point	Maximum elevation	Lowest point	Minimum elevation	Elevation span
Northern Hemisphere	Mount Everest, China and Nepal	8848 m 29,029 ft	Dead Sea, Israel, Jordan, and Palestine	−428 m −1,404 ft	9,276 m 30,433 ft
Southern Hemisphere	Aconcagua, Argentina	6960 m 22,835 ft	Laguna del Carbón, Argentina	−105 m −344 ft	7065 m 23,179 ft
Eastern Hemisphere	Mount Everest, China and Nepal	8848 m 29,029 ft	Dead Sea, Israel, Jordan, and Palestine	−428 m −1,404 ft	9,276 m 30,433 ft
Western Hemisphere	Aconcagua, Argentina	6960 m 22,835 ft	Laguna del Carbón, Argentina	−105 m −344 ft	7065 m 23,179 ft

== Gallery ==
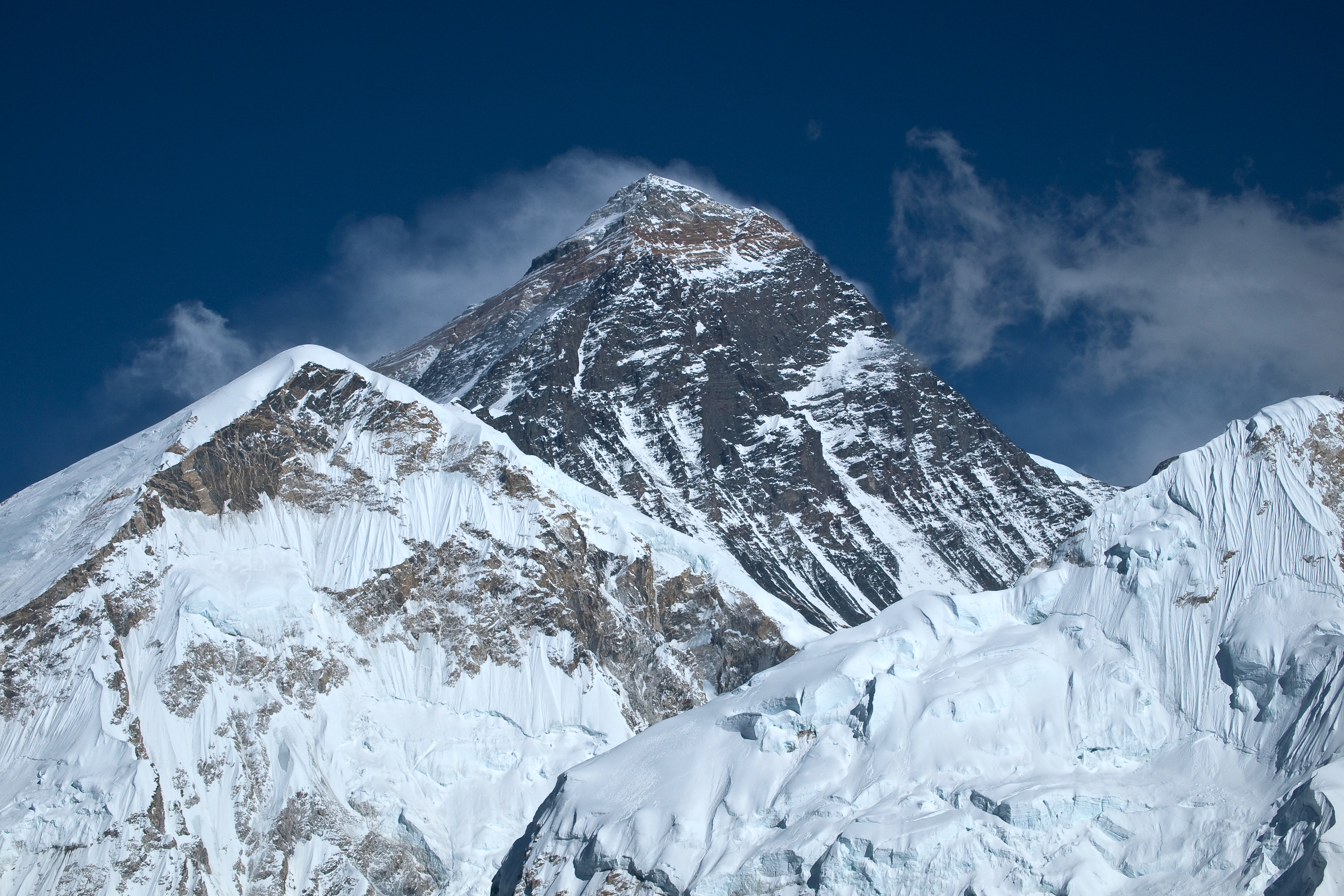
The summit of Mount Everest in China and Nepal is the highest point on Earth.

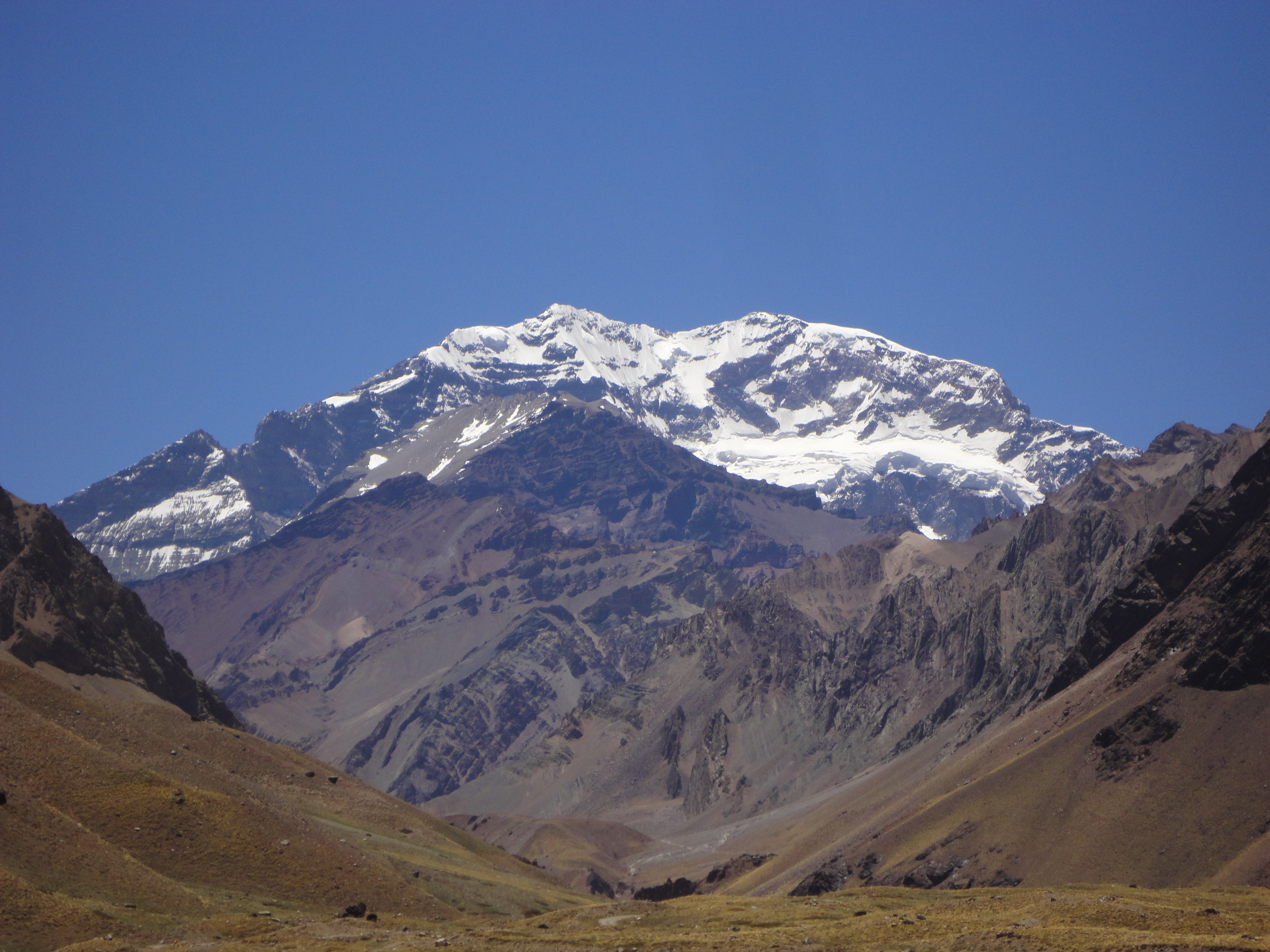
The summit of Aconcagua is the highest point of Argentina and the Southern and Western hemispheres.

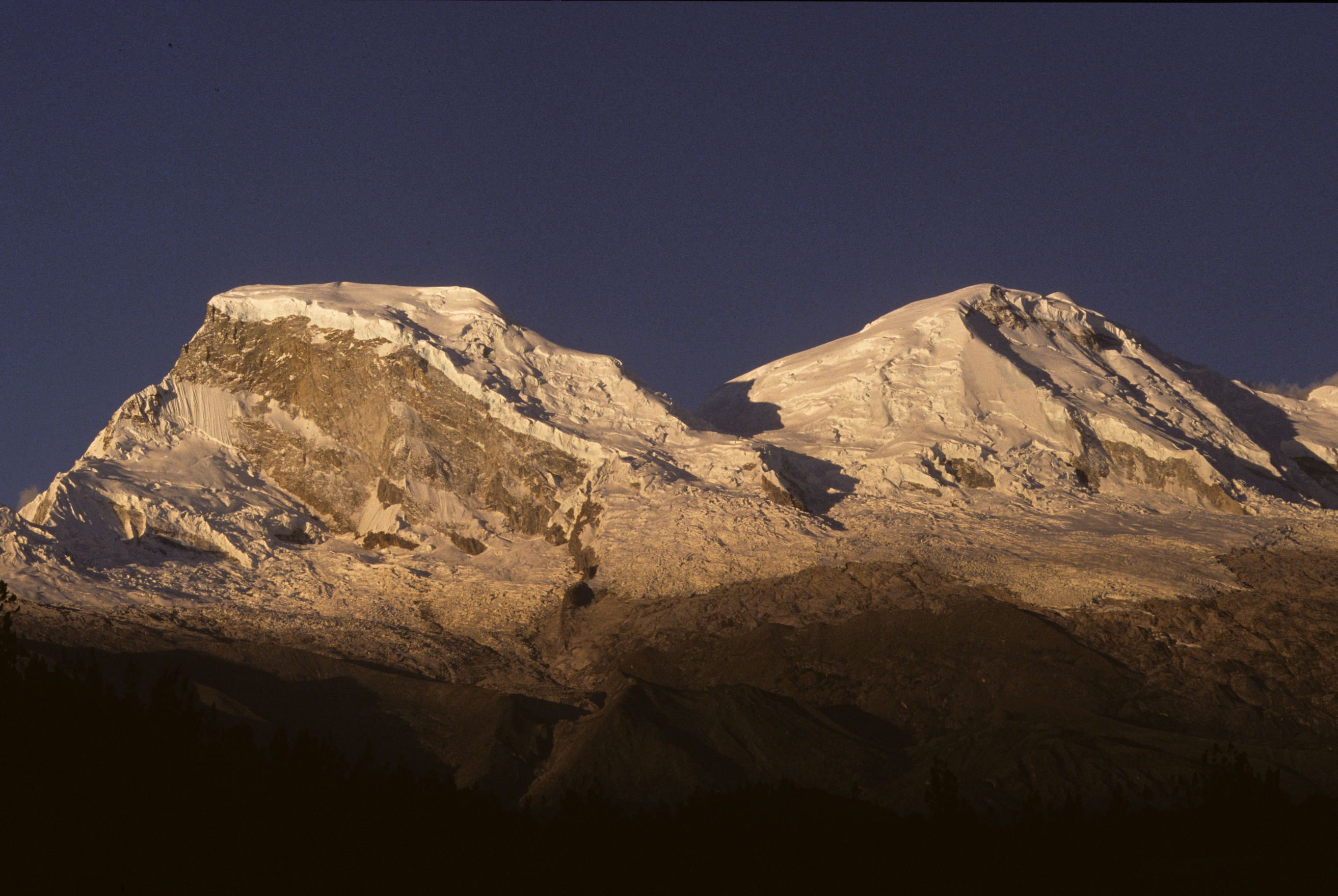
The summit of Huáscarán is the highest point of Peru and the Tropics.

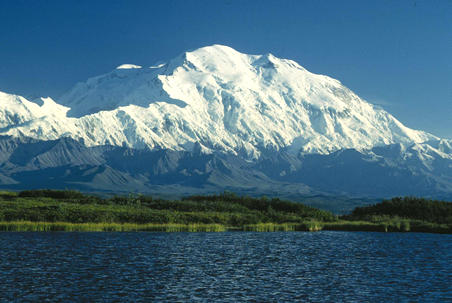
The summit of Denali is the highest point of the United States and North America.

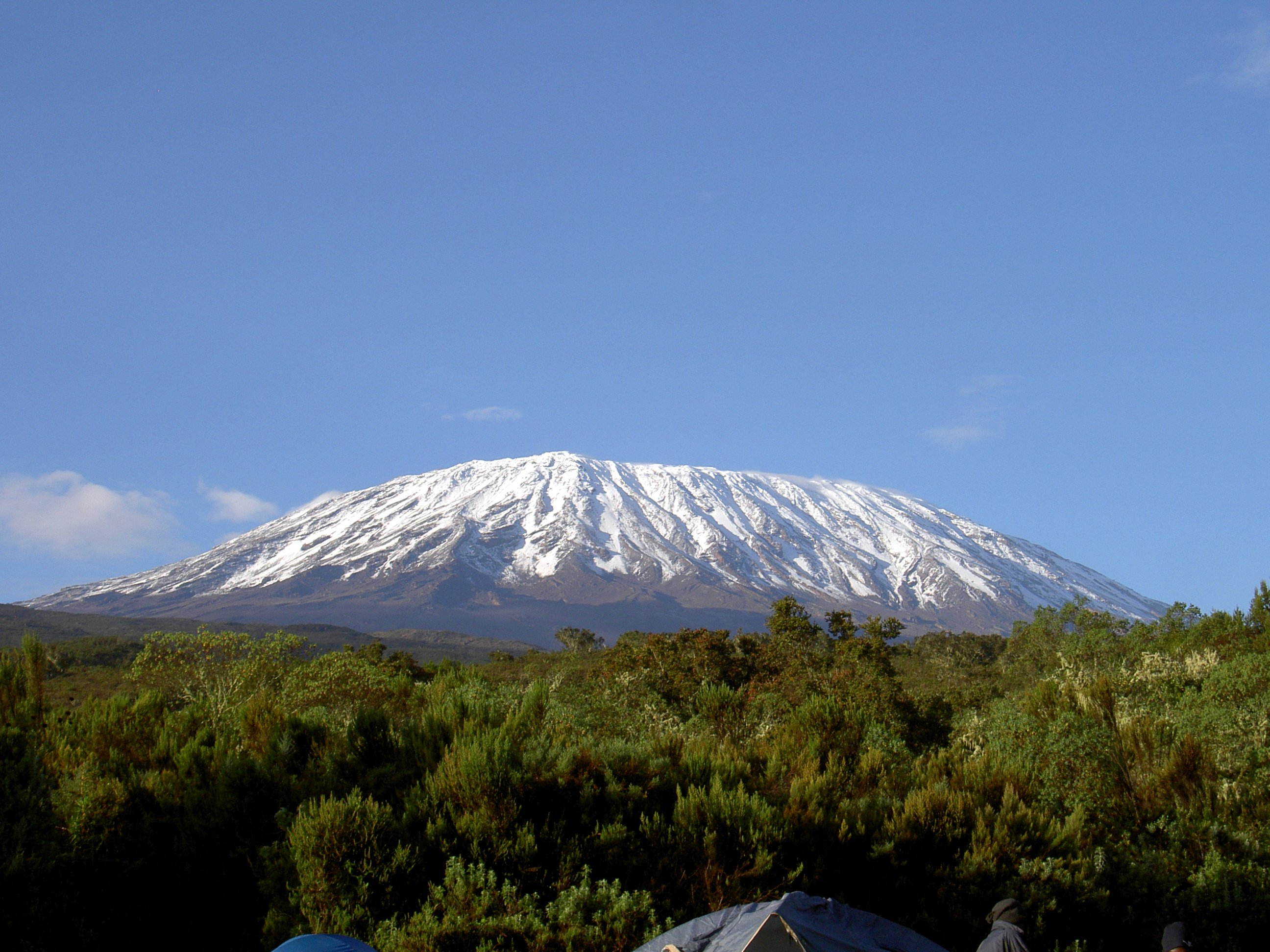
The summit of Kilimanjaro is the highest point of Tanzania and Africa.

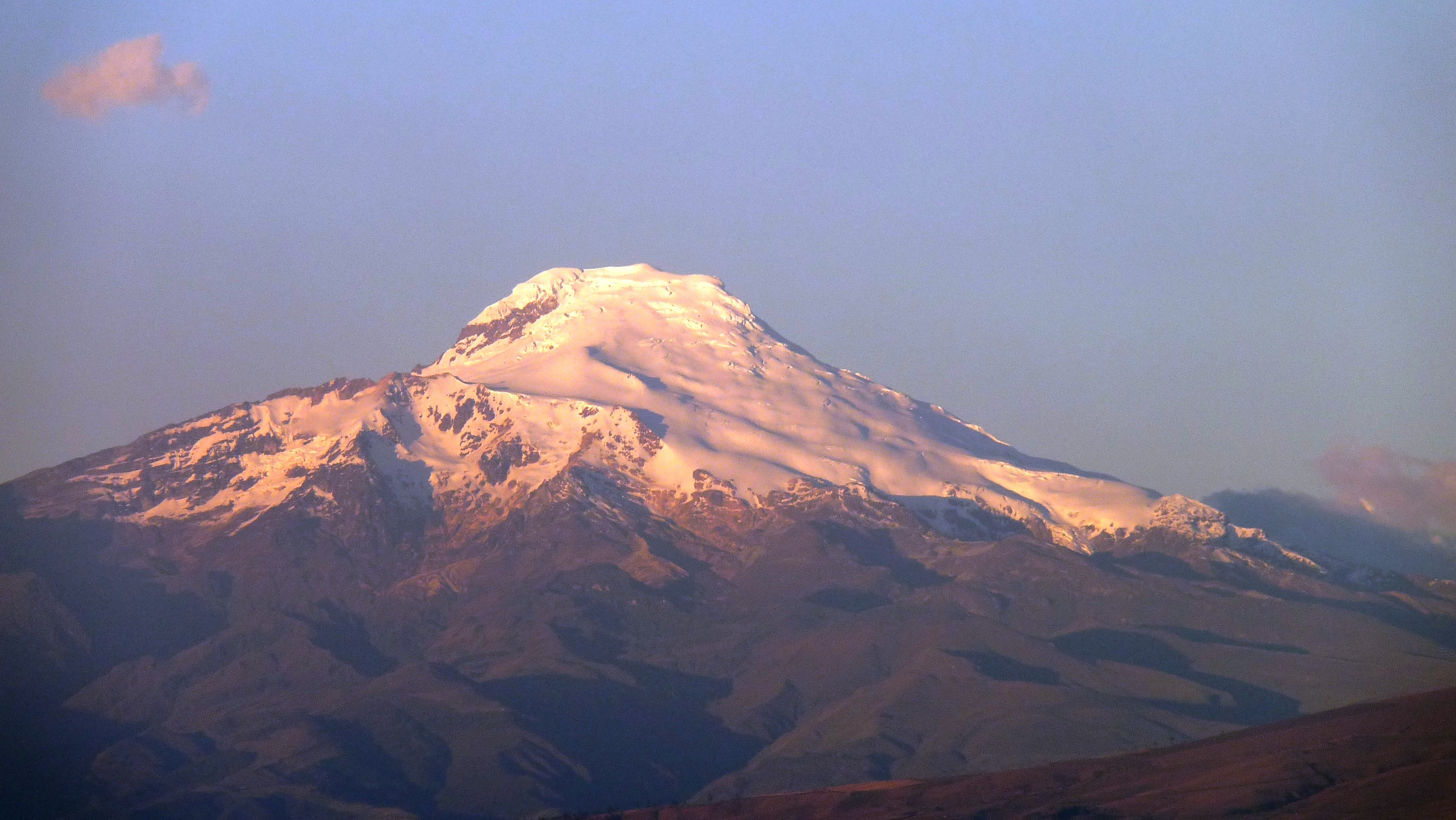
The summit of Cayambe in Ecuador is the highest point of the Northern Tropics.

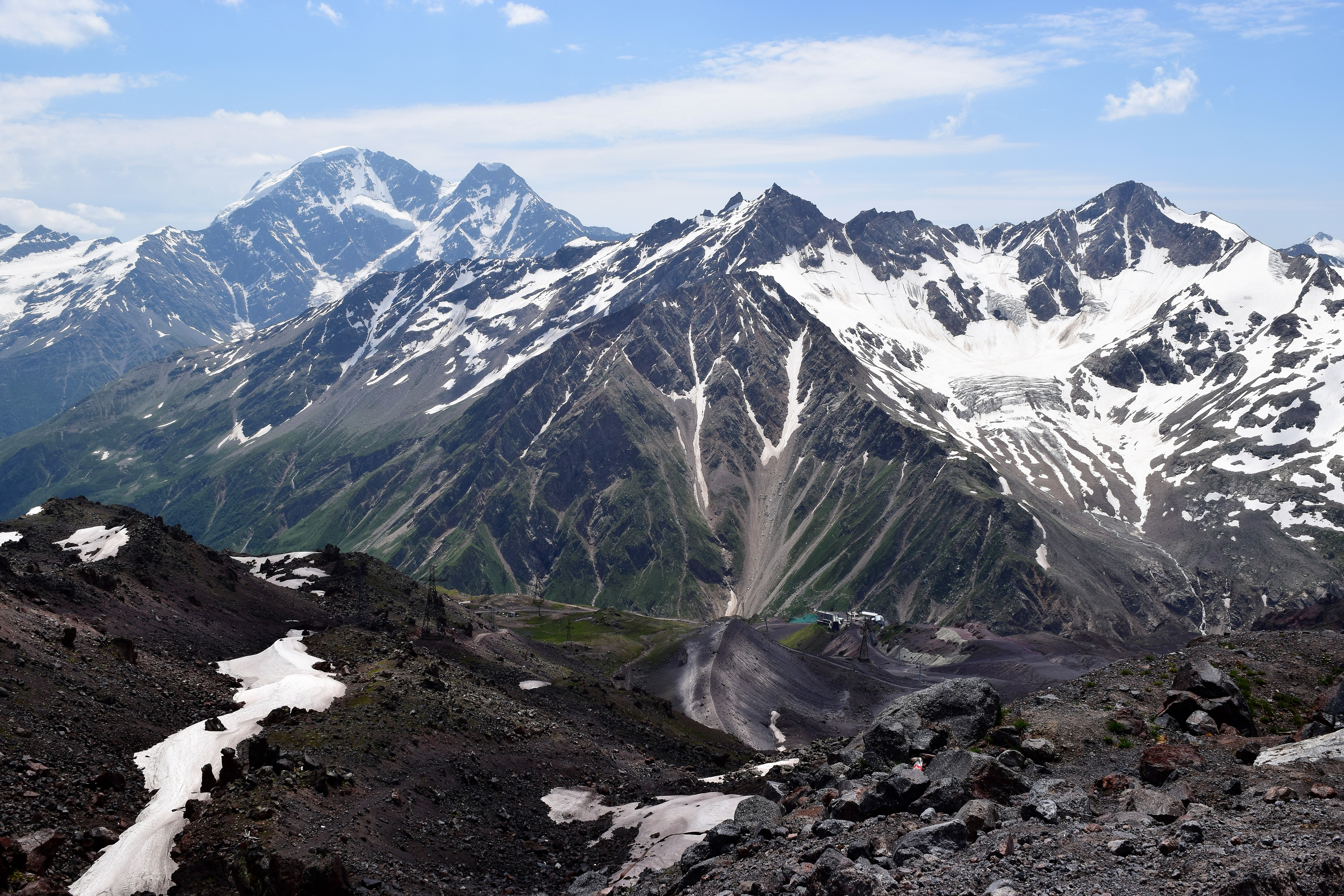
The summit of Mount Elbrus in Russia is the highest point of Europe.

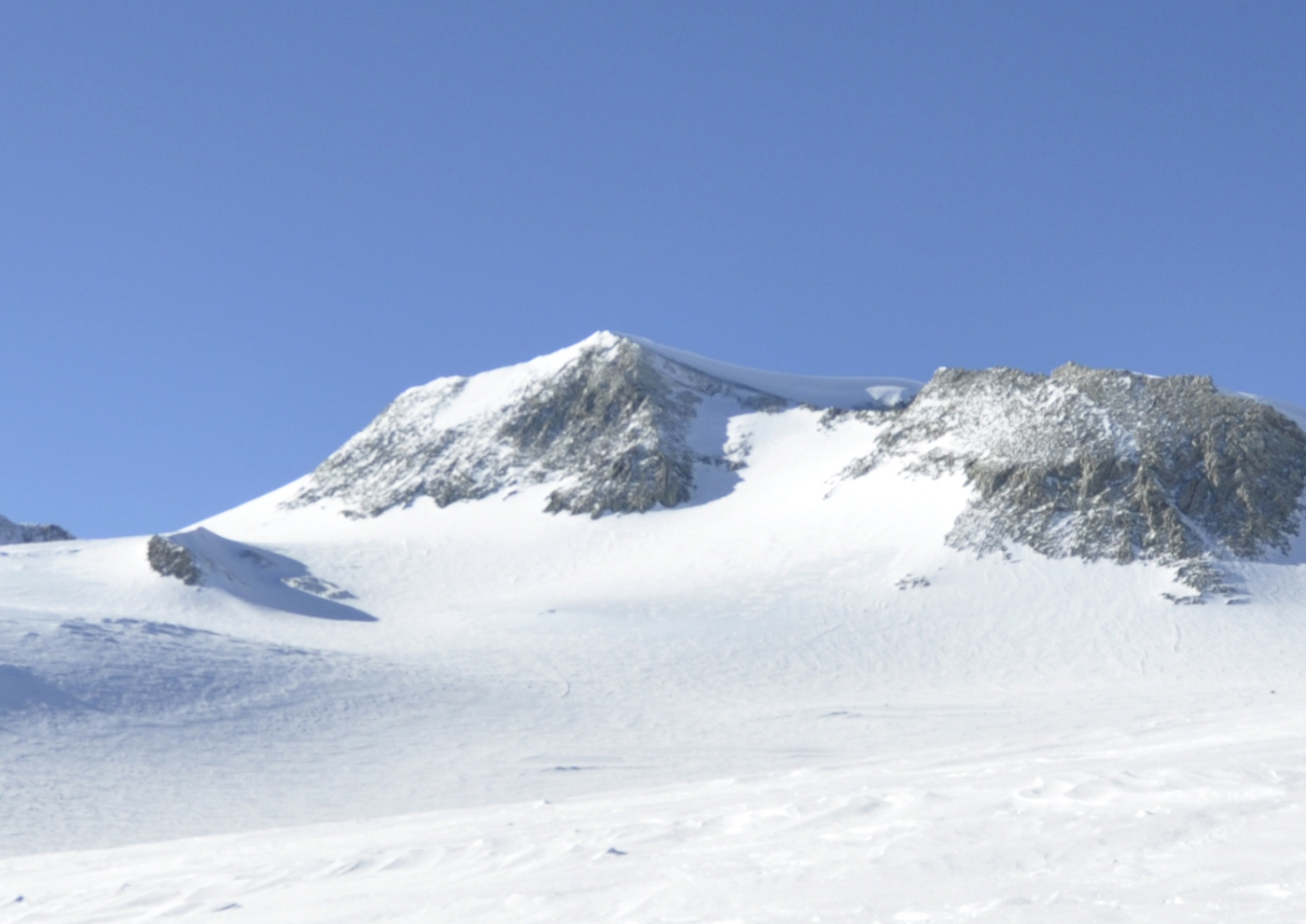
The summit of Mount Vinson is the highest point of Antarctica and the Antarctic.

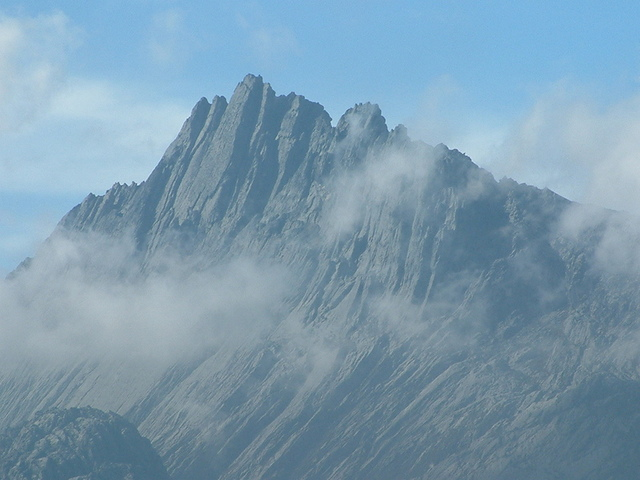
The summit of Puncak Jaya on New Guinea is the highest point of Indonesia and all ocean islands.

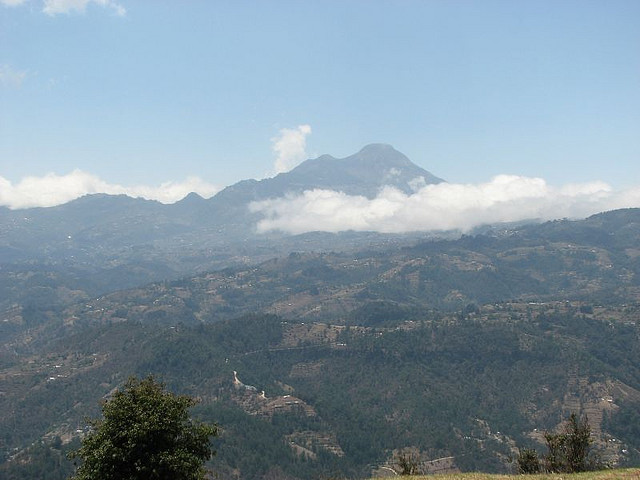
The summit of Volcan Tajumulco is the highest point of Guatemala and Central America.

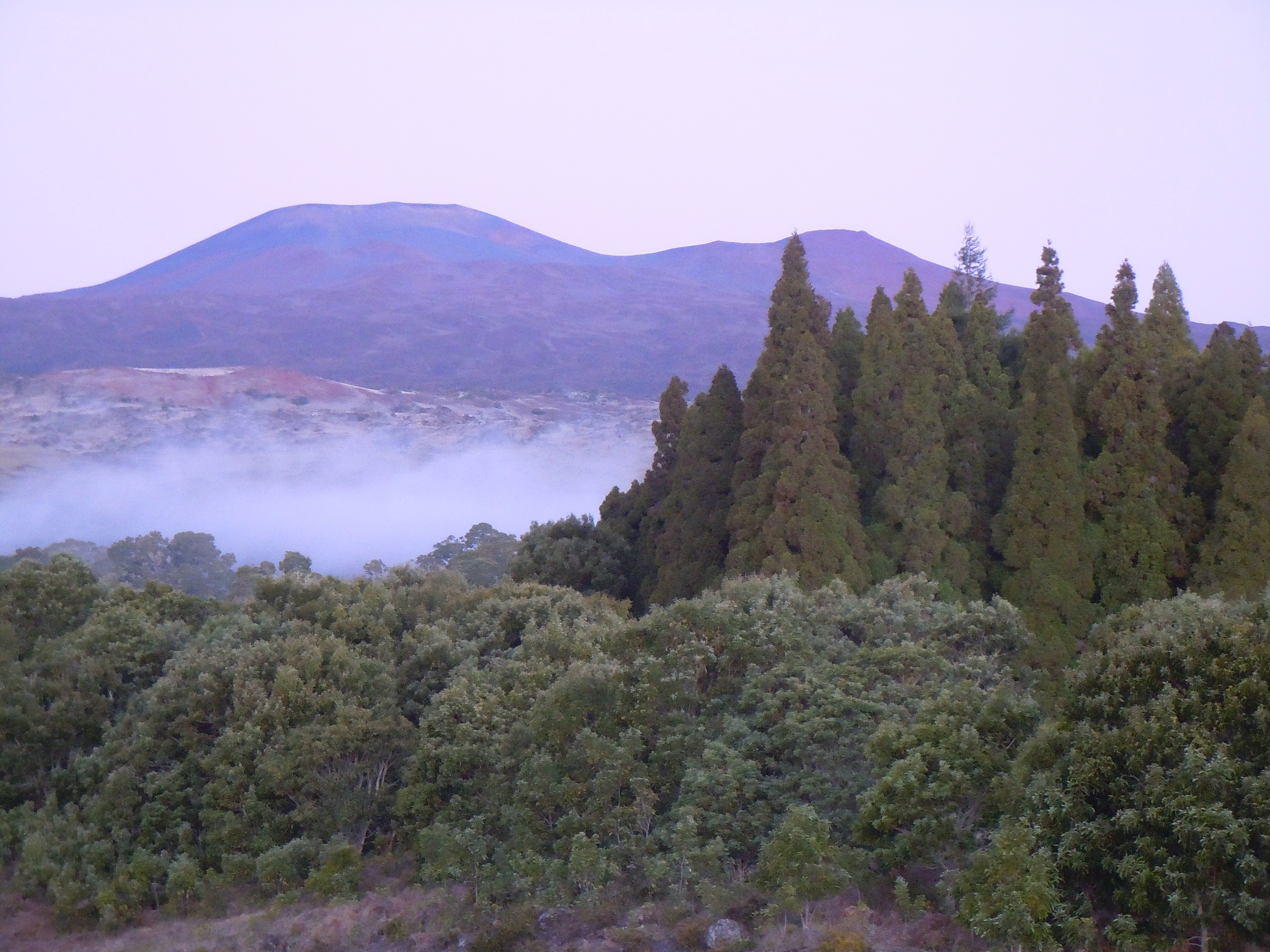
The summit of Mauna Kea on Hawaiʻi is the highest point in the North Pacific Ocean.

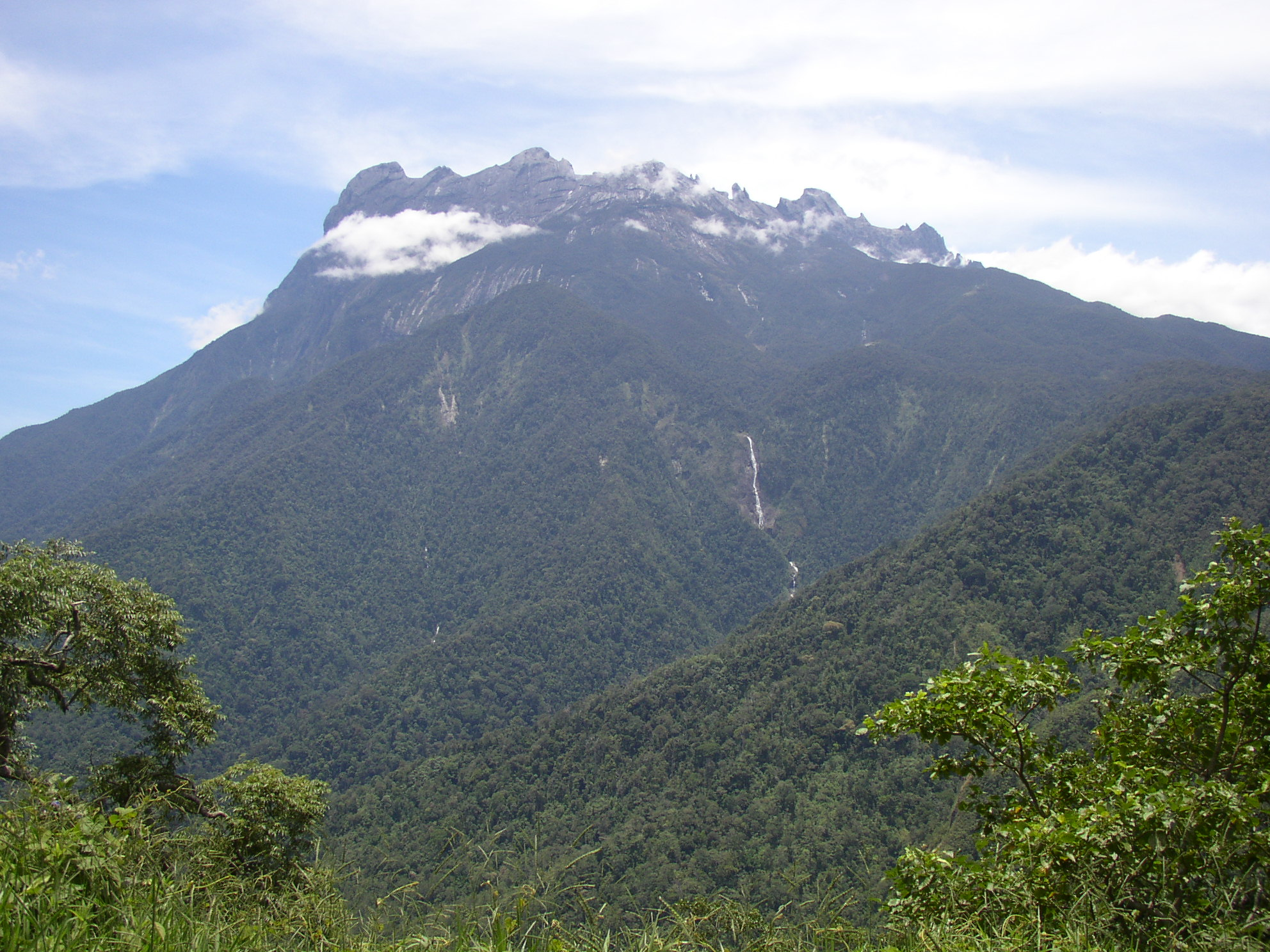
The summit of Mount Kinabalu on Borneo is the highest point in the Malay Archipelago.

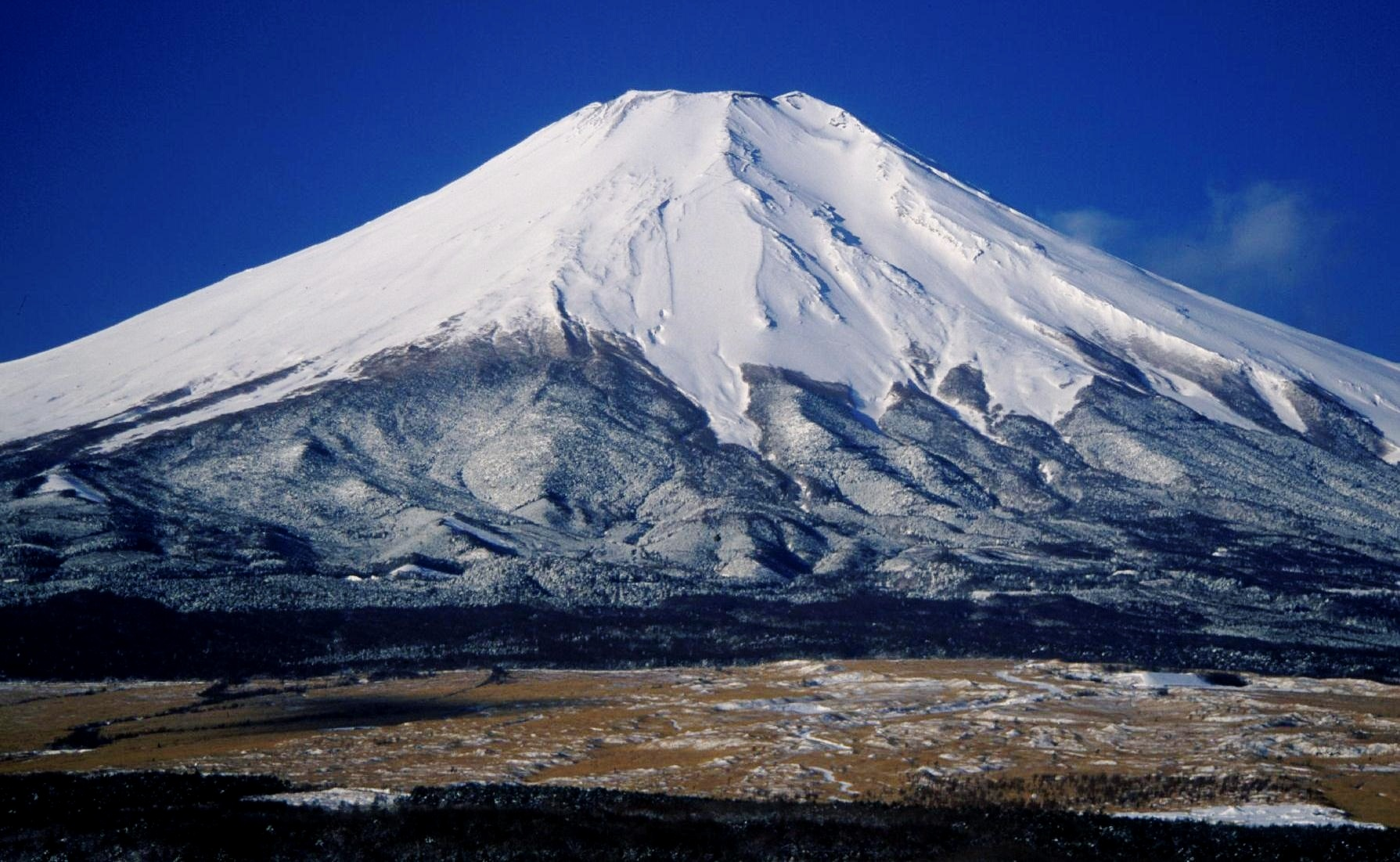
The summit of Mount Fuji on Honshū is the highest point in the Japanese archipelago.

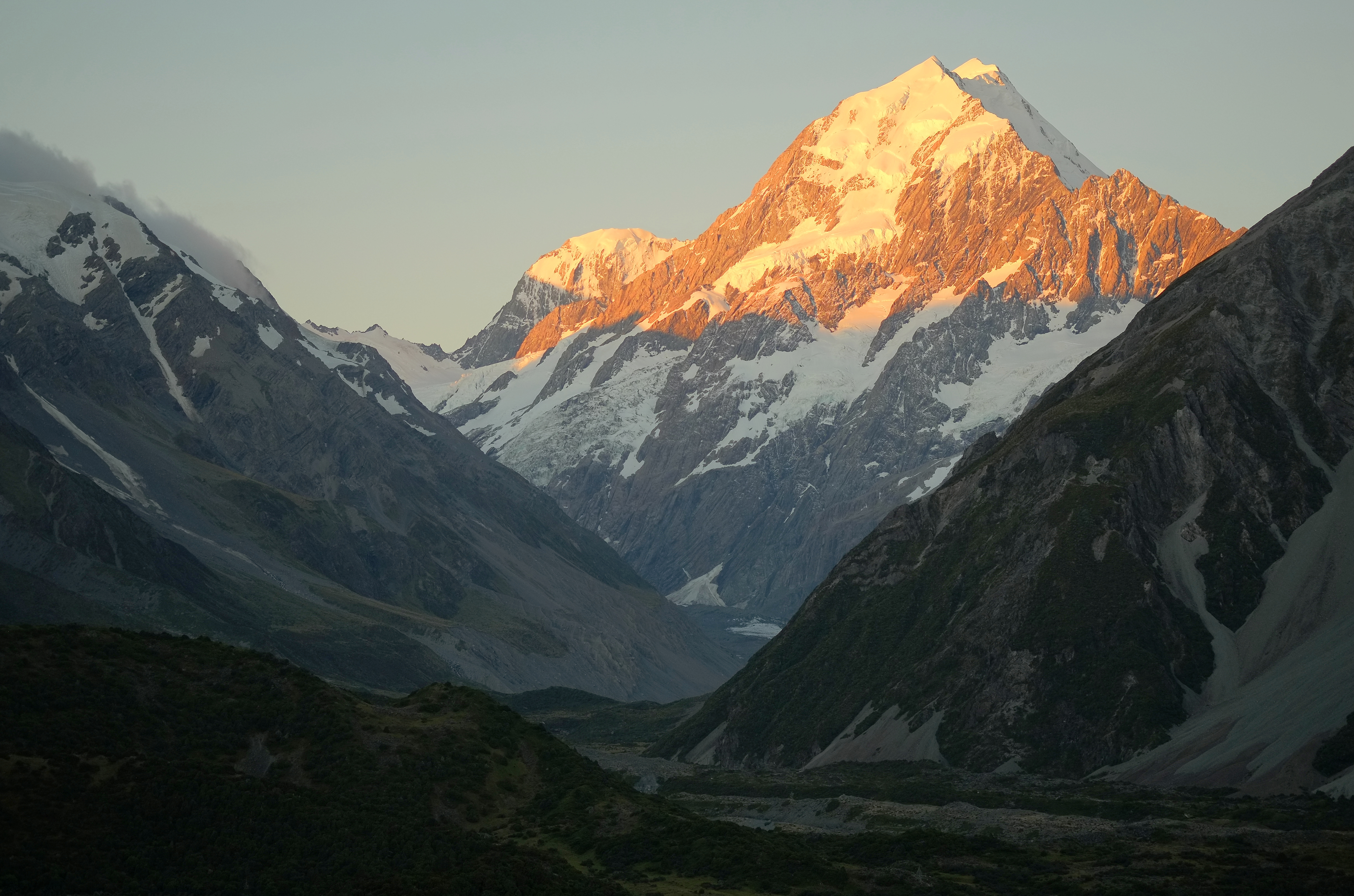
The summit of Aoraki / Mount Cook on South Island is the highest point in New Zealand and Australasia.

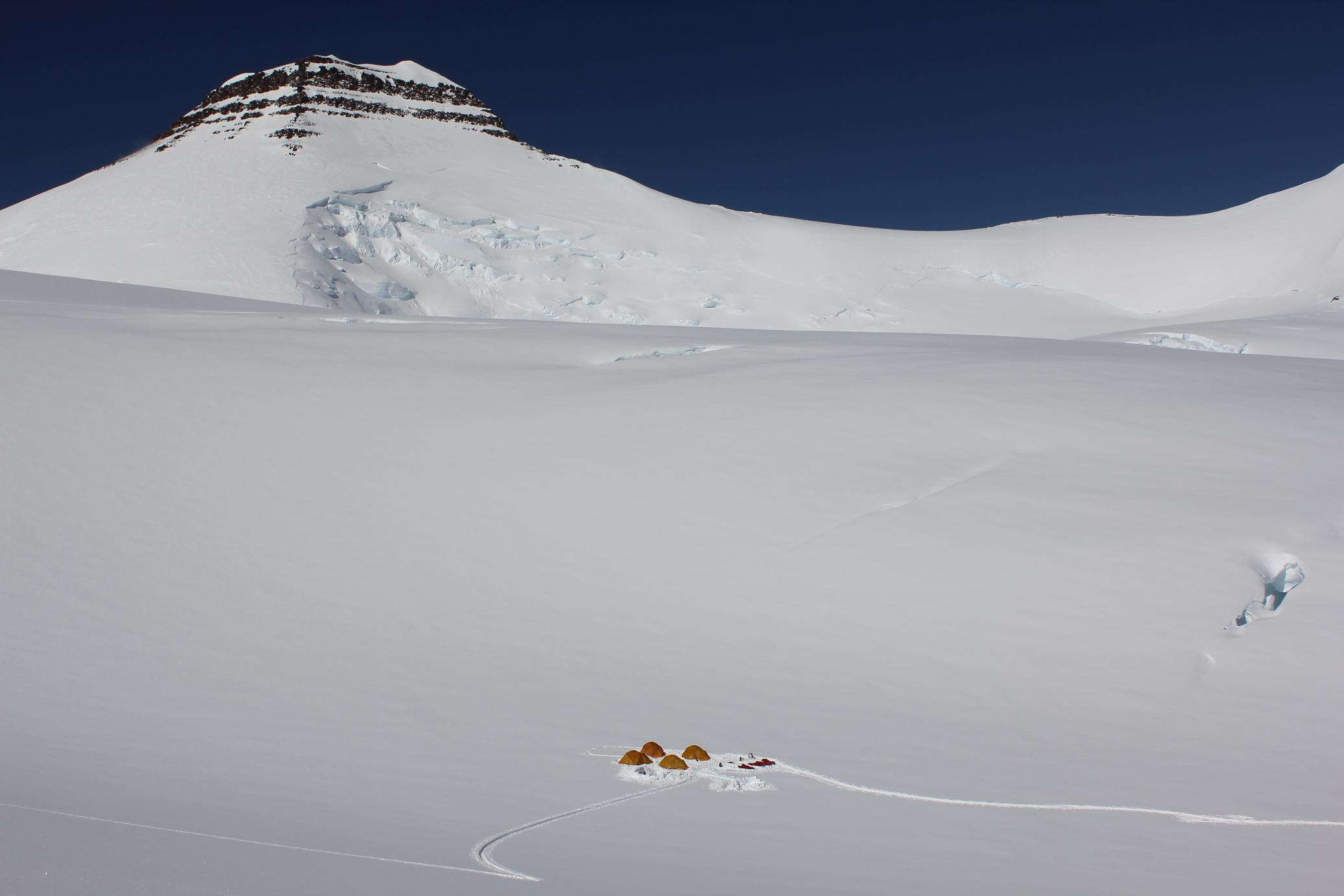
The summit of Gunnbjorn Fjeld is the highest point of Greenland and the Arctic.

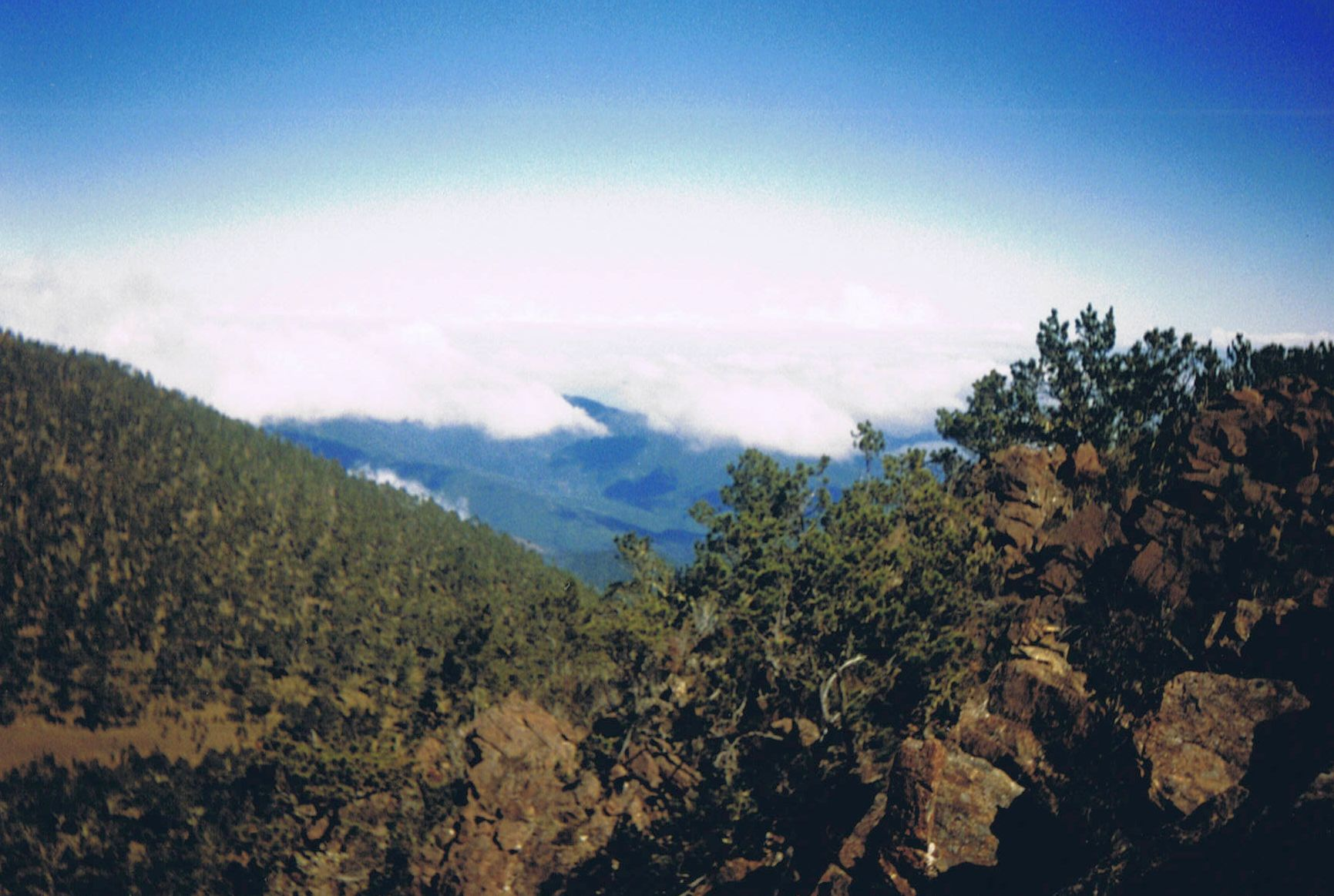
The summit of Pico Duarte in the Dominican Republic on Hispaniola is the highest point in the Caribbean.

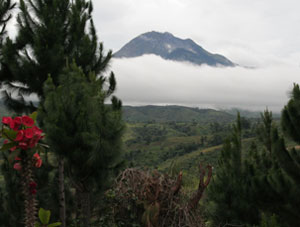
The summit of Mount Apo on Mindanao is the highest point in the Philippine Archipelago.

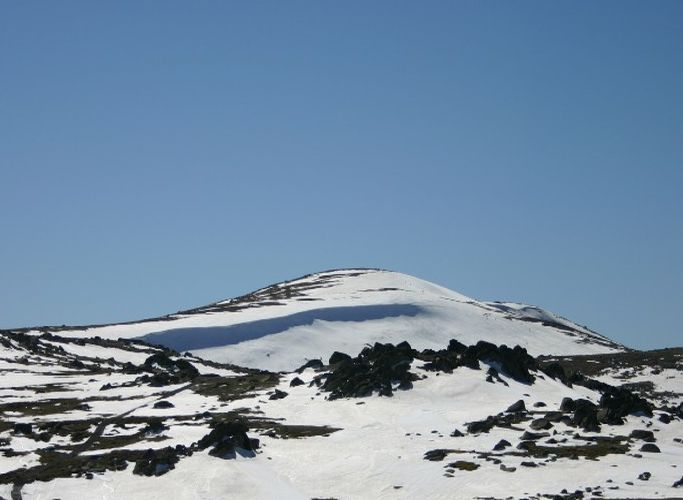
The summit of Mount Kosciuszko is the highest point of Australia.

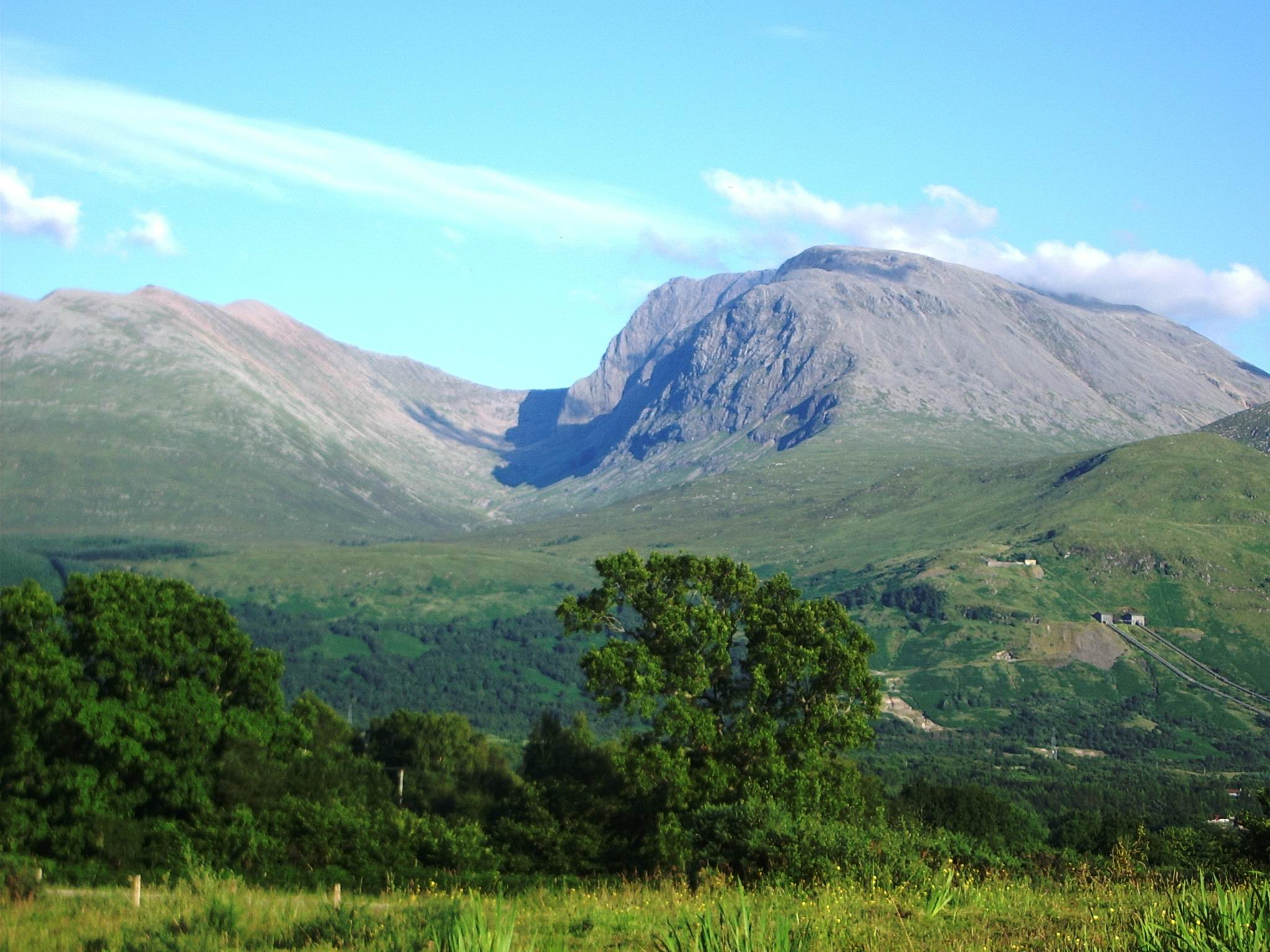
The summit of Ben Nevis on Great Britain is the highest point of the United Kingdom and the British Isles.

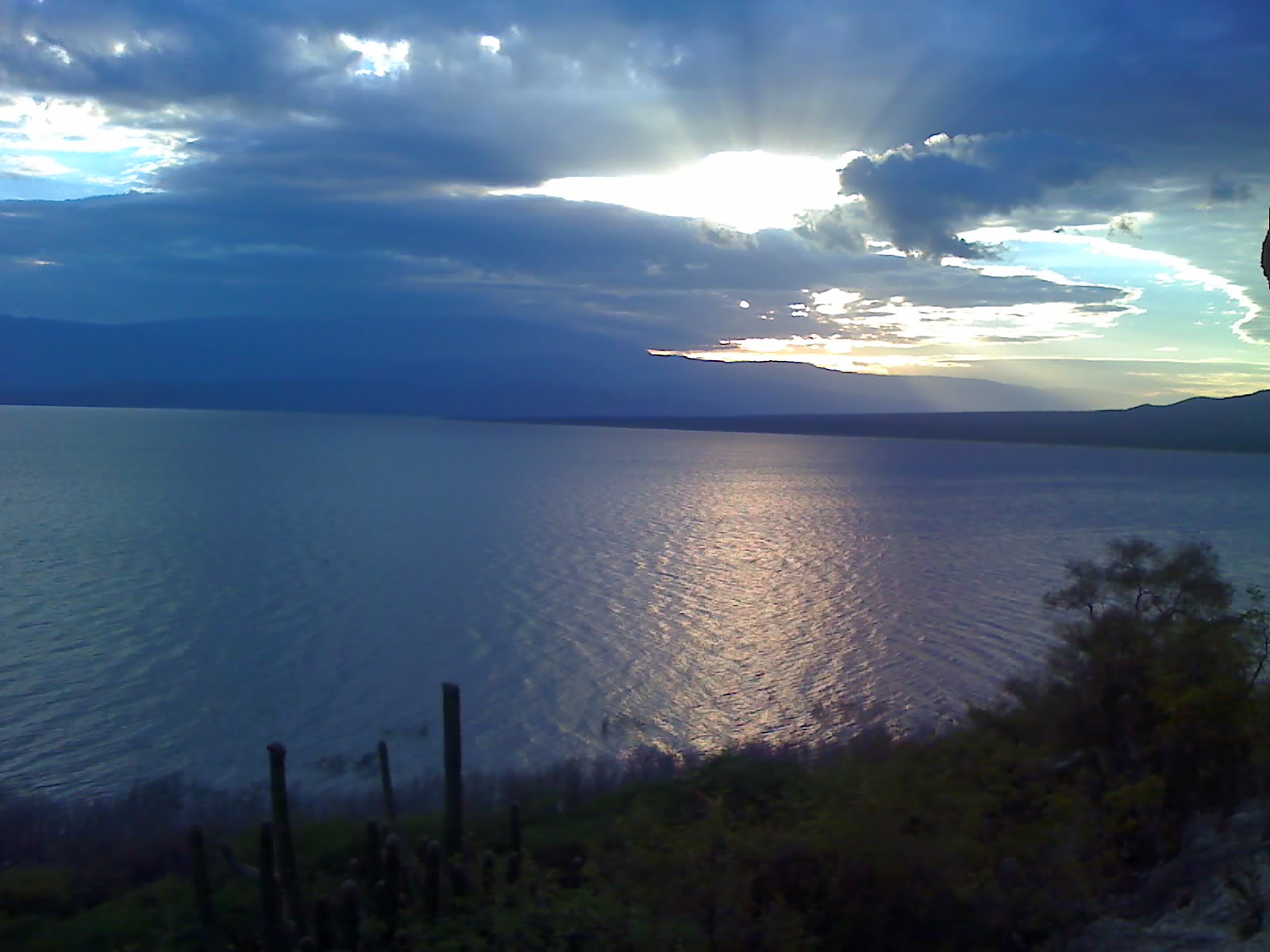
Lago Enriquillo on Hispaniola is the lowest point of the Dominican Republic and all ocean islands.

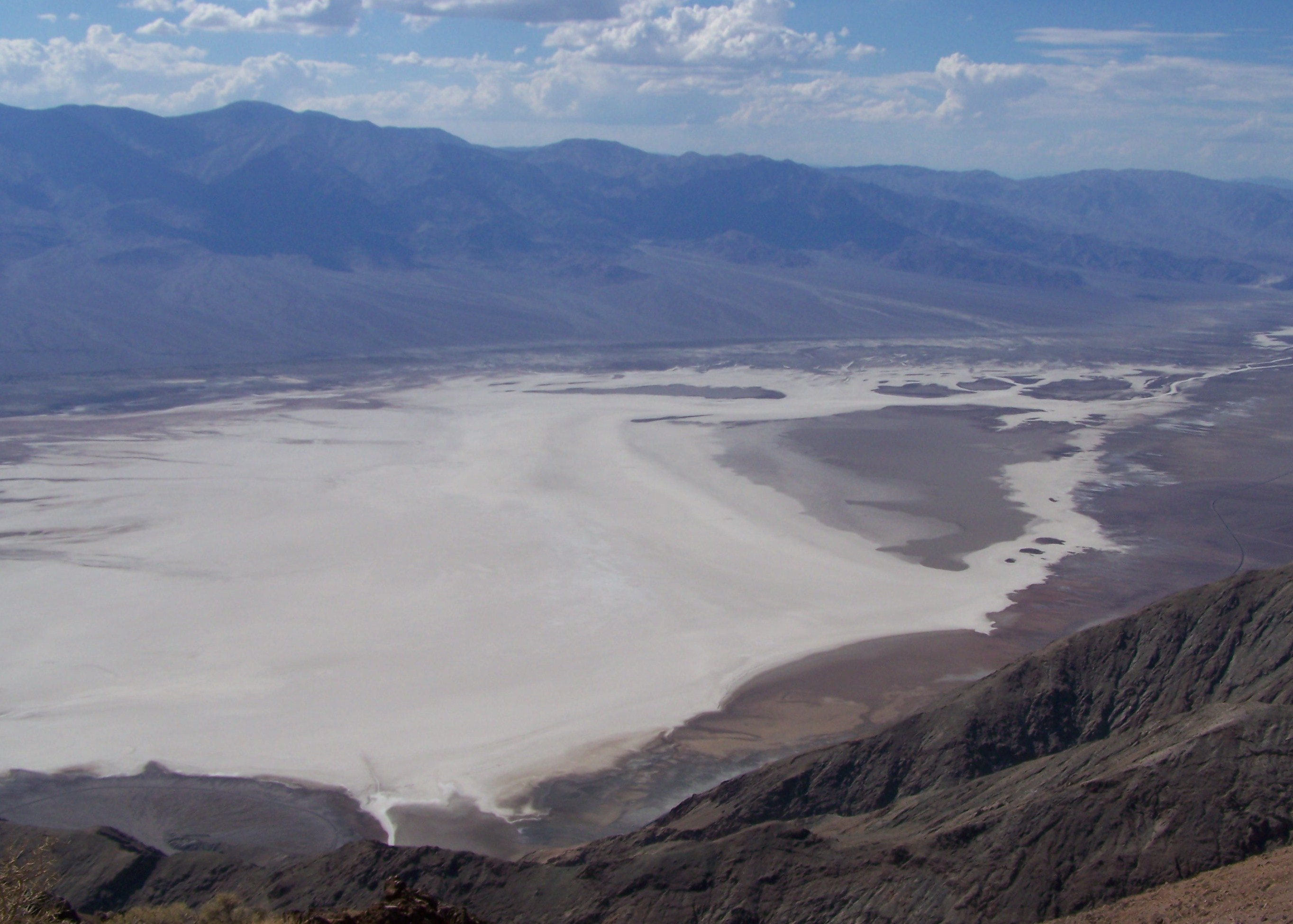
The Badwater Basin in Death Valley is the lowest point of the United States and North America.

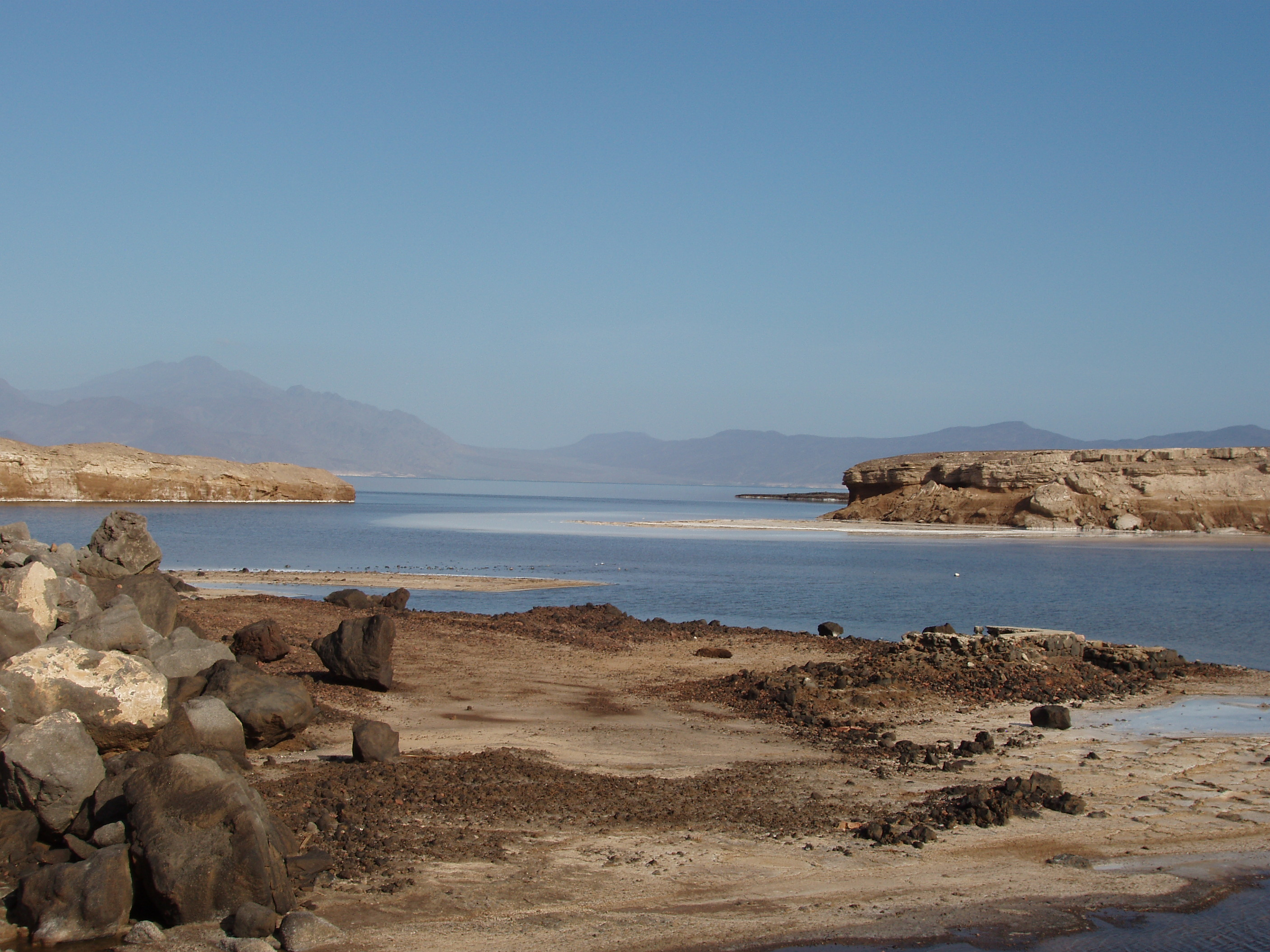
Lake Asal is the lowest point of Djibouti, Africa, and the Tropics.

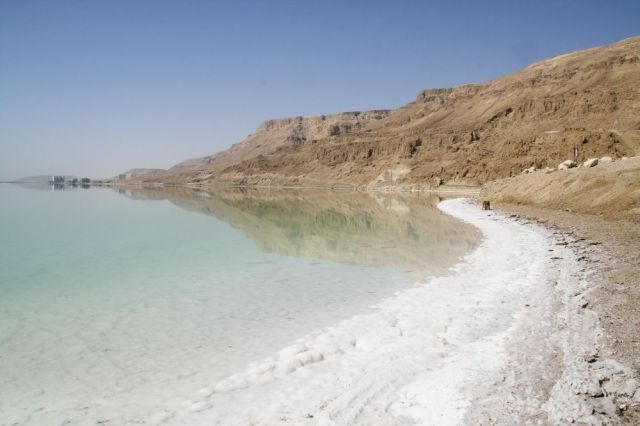
The Dead Sea is the lowest point on Earth.

== See also ==
- List of elevation extremes by country
- Geodesy
  - Geoid
  - Nadir
  - Summit
  - Topographic elevation
  - Topographic isolation
  - Topographic prominence
- Category:Highest points
- Category:Lowest points
