= List of volcanoes in Djibouti =

This is a list of active and extinct volcanoes in Djibouti.

Name	Elevation		Location	Last eruption
Name	meters	feet	Coordinates	Last eruption
Ardoukoba	298	978	11.58°N 42.47°E	1978
Boina	300	984	11.25°N 41.83°E	Pleistocene
Garbes	1000	3281	11.42°N 42.20°E	Pleistocene
Manda-Inakir	600	1969	12.38°N 42.2°E	1928
Tiho	500	1640	11.53°N 42.05°E	Uncertain
