= Ardoukoba =

Volcano in Djibouti

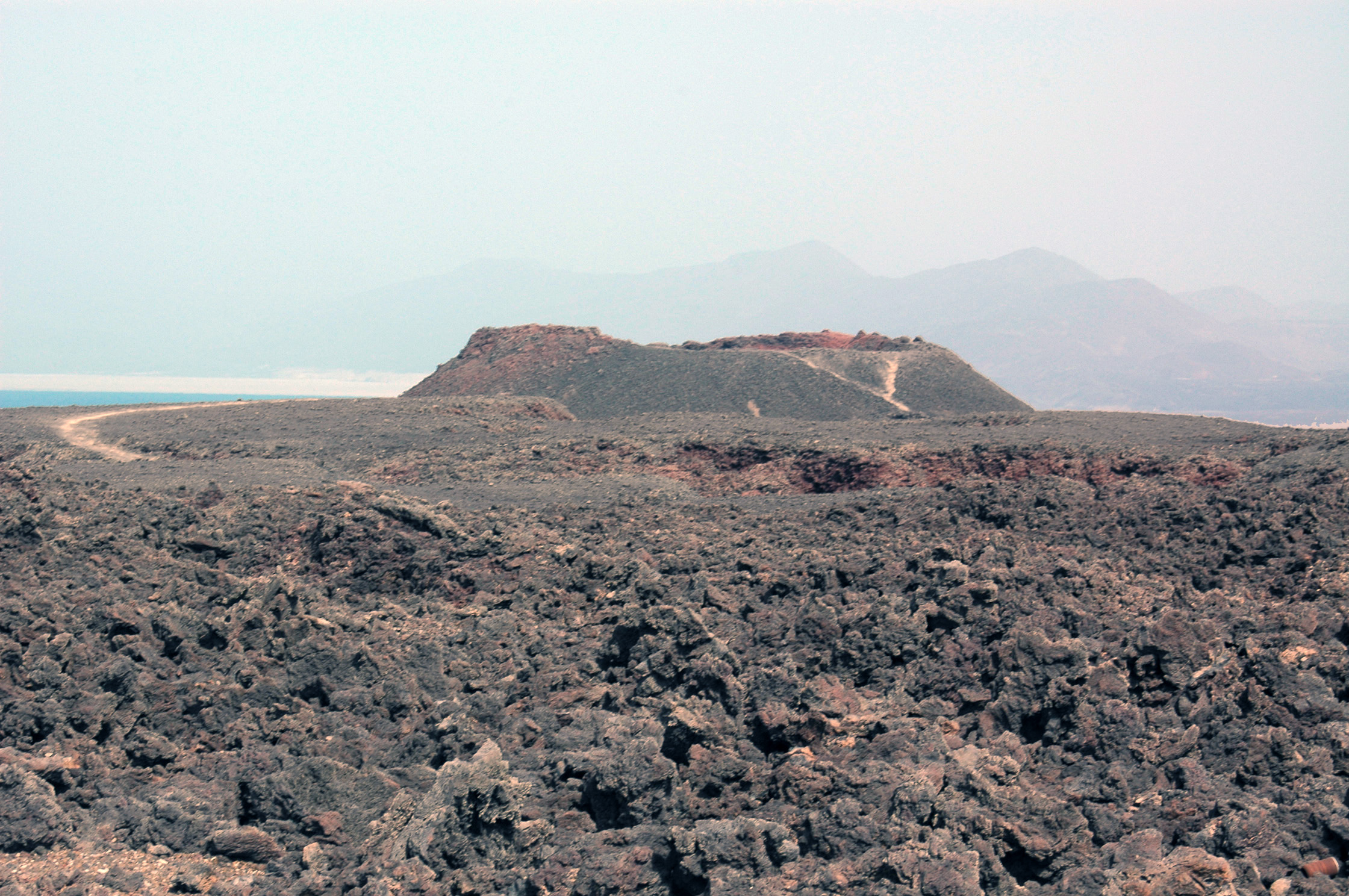

Highest point
- Elevation: 298 m (978 ft)
- Listing: Volcanoes of Djibouti
- Coordinates: 11°36′N 42°29′E

Naming
- Native name: أردوكوبا (Arabic)

Geography
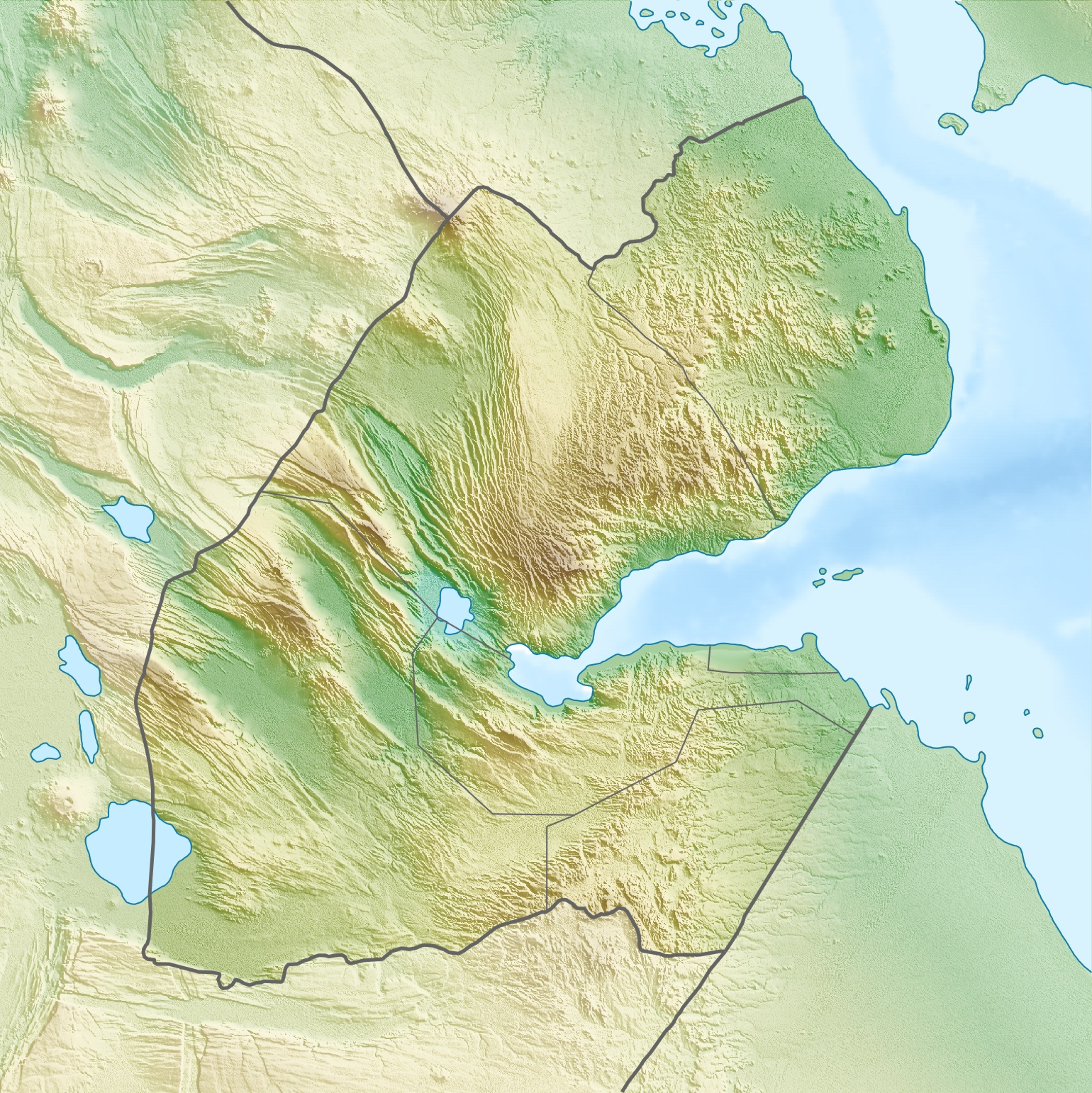
- Location within Djibouti
- Country: Djibouti

Geology
- Mountain type: Fissure vent
- Last eruption: November 1978

Ardoukoba (Arabic: أردوكوبا) is a fissure vents volcano in Djibouti. Located on the coast 100 kilometres (62 mi) from Djibouti City, its summit is situated at 298 metres (978 ft) above sea level. It last erupted in November 1978 following an earthquake, the area having been dormant for 3,000 years. The volcano's rift is 17 kilometres (11 mi) in width, and has a depth of 800 metres (2,600 ft).

The Government of Djibouti has initiated a proposal with UNESCO to declare the Lake Assal zone including the Ardoukoba volcano and its surroundings as a World Heritage Site.

== Geography ==
Culminating at an altitude of 298 meters, the Ardoukôba is a volcano born from a volcanic fissure and composed of a pile of basaltic slag forming three cones emitting two flows of fluid basaltic lava. These eruptive characteristics classify the Ardoukôba among the red volcanoes fed by a rift magma. This northwest-southeast trending volcanic fissure is part of the Great Rift Valley fault system between the Danakil block in the northeast and the Afar depression in the southwest.

== History ==
The Ardoukôba experienced only one eruption, that of its birth, from November 7 to 14, 1978, which follows a volcanic rest of 3,000 years in this part of the rift.

Preceding the onset of the eruption, a total of 800 earthquakes of magnitude less than 3.3 occurred for 24 hours six kilometers from the Ardoukôba, towards Ghoubbet-el-Kharab. An episode of high volcanic gas emission was triggered just before the opening of a 500-meter-long crack through which fluid basaltic lava escaped at three points, quickly forming as many slag cones through which escaped two lava flows flowing over the bottom of the rift towards Lake Assal and Ghoubbet-el-Kharab. The lava emission was accompanied by the formation of a volcanic plume reaching a height of 300 meters, as well as by the projection of tephras up to a height of 70 meters. The initial flow of 500,000 m³ of lava per hour fell after the fifth to sixth day after the onset of eruption. In doing so, a single cone, Gira-le-Koma, thirty meters high, 200 meters long and 25 meters wide, remained active from the ninth day. It contained a lava lake that lasted until the thirteenth day and the only lava emitted, in the form of slag and volcanic bombs, continued until the next day, which marked the end of the eruption.

During this typically Hawaiian eruption of red volcanoes fueled by a rift, a total of twelve million cubic meters of fluid basaltic lava was emitted. Lava flows are usually one to two meters thick but can reach a thickness of 25 meters. Twenty-five normal and parallel cracks, one millimeter to two meters wide, opened in a northwesterly-southeasterly direction, reflecting the formation of an escarpment fifty centimeters high.
