= Ghoubbet-el-Kharab =

Bay in Djibouti

Lake Ghoubbet
- قبة الخراب (Arabic); Ghoubbet-el-Kharab (Arabic)
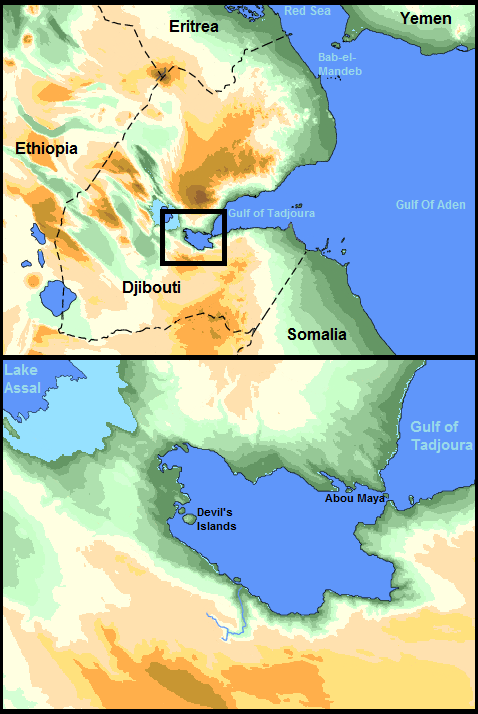

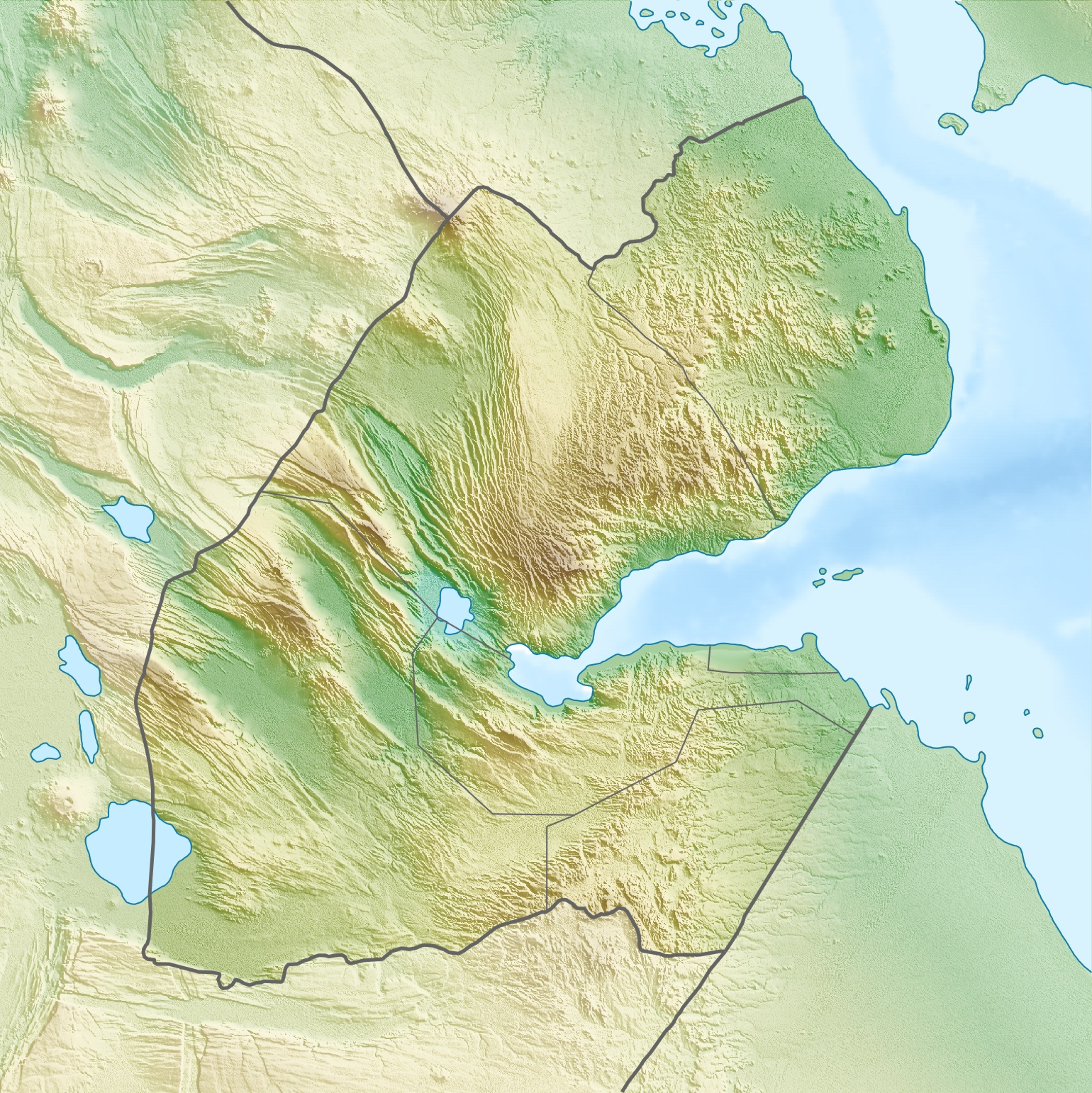
- Location within Djibouti
- Coordinates: 11.5261°N 42.6036°E
- Type: cove
- Basin countries: Djibouti
- Max. length: 13 mi (21 km)
- Max. width: 7 mi (11 km)
- Surface area: 158 km^{2} (61 sq mi)
- Average depth: 205 m (673 ft)
- Salinity: 3.7–3.8%
- Max. temperature: 32 °C (90 °F)
- Min. temperature: 27 °C (81 °F)
- Islands: Devil's Islands, Abou Maya Island

The Ghoubbet al-Kharab or Lake Ghoubbet (Arabic: قبة الخراب, "the Gulf of the Demons") is a Djiboutian cove separated from the Gulf of Tadjoura by a narrow channel historically known to have violent currents. Ghoubbet al-Kharab is surrounded by mountains and cliffs 600 meters high, as well as by the Ardoukôba volcano which separates it from Lake Assal. It is very deep (200 meters) and hosts many fish and sharks that grow in the strong gulf currents, and is part of the junction between the African and Arabian continental plates. Formations like "The Crack" (or "La Faille") and reefs like Ras Eiro are popular locations for divers to visit. Scientists also visit the region like Captain Cousteau in the 1980s.

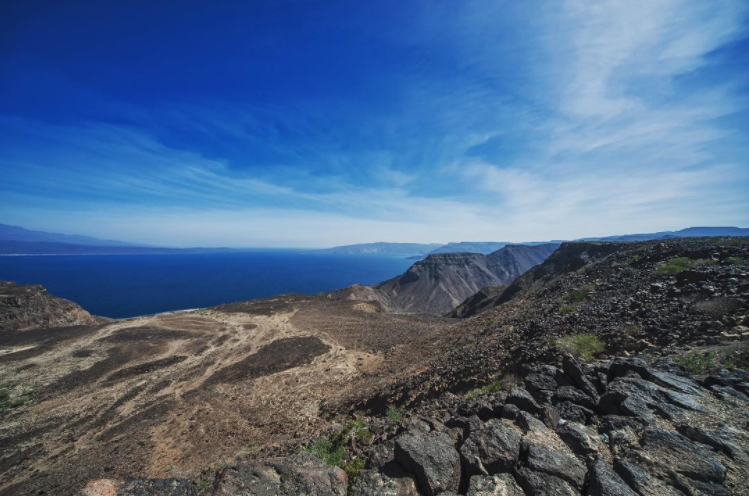
Ghoubbet-el-Kharab

The level of Ghoubbet al-Kharab can rise and fall, varying up to one meter from sea level due to the tides, winds, and the narrowness of the outlet to the Gulf of Tadjoura.

At the far western shores of the Ghoubbet al-Kharab are two volcanic islands: the Devil's Islands.
