= Lake Assal (Djibouti) =

Salt lake below sea level

- Lac Assal بحيرة عسل
- بحيرة عسل (Arabic); Buḥayrah ʿAsal (Arabic)
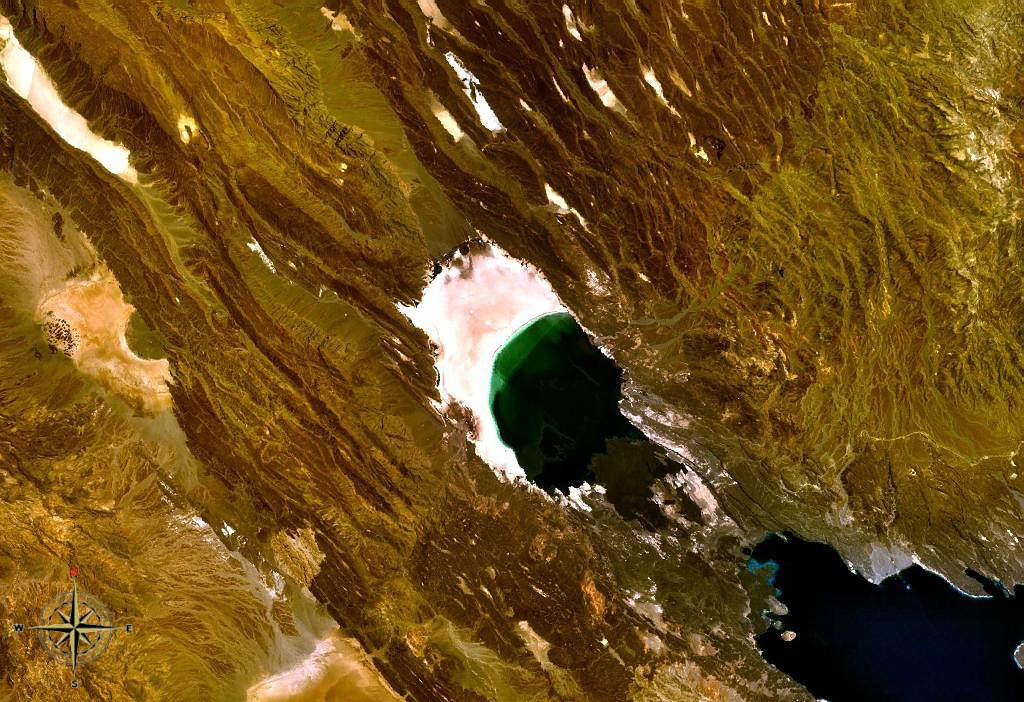

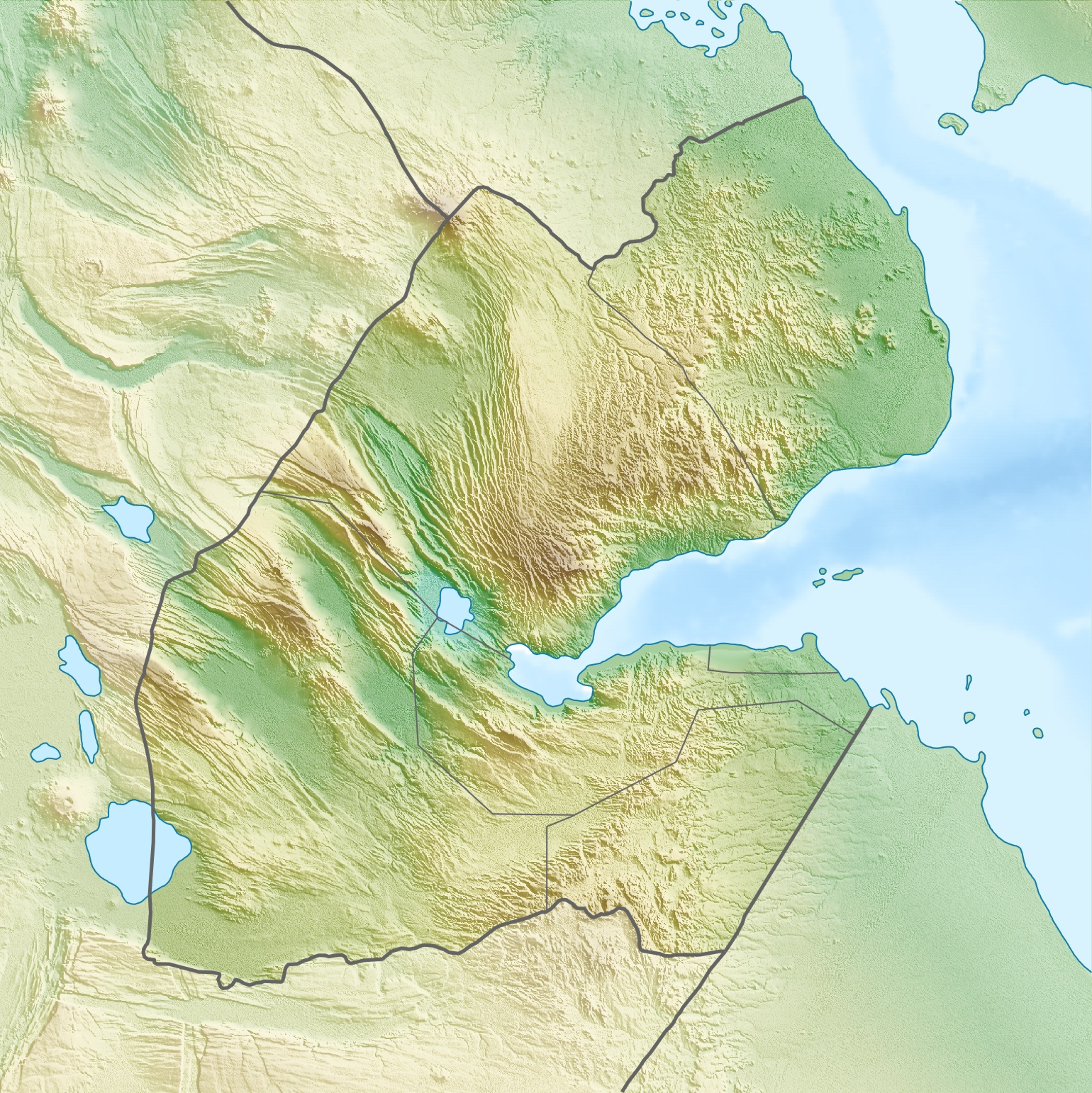
- Location within Djibouti
- Location: Tadjourah Region
- Coordinates: 11°39′N 42°25′E
- Type: Crater; Hypersaline
- Primary inflows: Subsurface from the ocean
- Primary outflows: Evaporation
- Catchment area: 900 km^{2} (350 sq mi)
- Basin countries: Djibouti
- Max. length: 19 km (12 mi)
- Max. width: 6.5 km (4.0 mi)
- Surface area: 54 km^{2} (21 sq mi)
- Average depth: 7.4 m (24 ft)
- Max. depth: > 40 m (130 ft)
- Water volume: 400 million cubic metres (320,000 acre⋅ft)
- Surface elevation: −155 m (−509 ft)
- Settlements: Randa (25 km or 16 mi northeast)

Lake Assal (Arabic: بحيرة عسل Buḥayrah ʿAsal, lit. “Honey Lake”) is a crater lake in central-western Djibouti. It is located at the western end of Gulf of Tadjoura between Arta Region, and Tadjoura Region, touching Dikhil Region, at the top of the Great Rift Valley, some 120 km (75 mi) west of Djibouti city. Lake Assal is a saline lake that lies 155 m (509 ft) below sea level in the Afar Triangle, making it the lowest point on land in Africa and the third-lowest point on Earth after the Sea of Galilee and the Dead Sea. No outflow occurs from the lake, and due to high evaporation, the salinity level of its waters is 10 times that of the sea, making it the fifth most saline body of water in the world, behind Garabogazköl, Lake Retba, Gaet'ale Pond and Lake Elton. The salt in the lake is exploited under four concessions awarded in 2002 at the southeast end of the lake; the major share of production (nearly 80%) is held by Société d’Exploitation du Lac and Société d’Exploitation du Salt Investment S.A de Djibouti.

The lake is a protected zone under Djibouti's National Environmental Action Plan of 2000. However, the law does not define the boundary limits of the lake. Since the exploitation of the salt from the lake was uncontrolled, the Plan has emphasized the need for managing the exploitation to avoid negative impact on the lake environment. The Government of Djibouti has initiated a proposal with UNESCO to declare the Lake Assal zone and the Ardoukoba volcano as a World Heritage Site.

== Geography ==
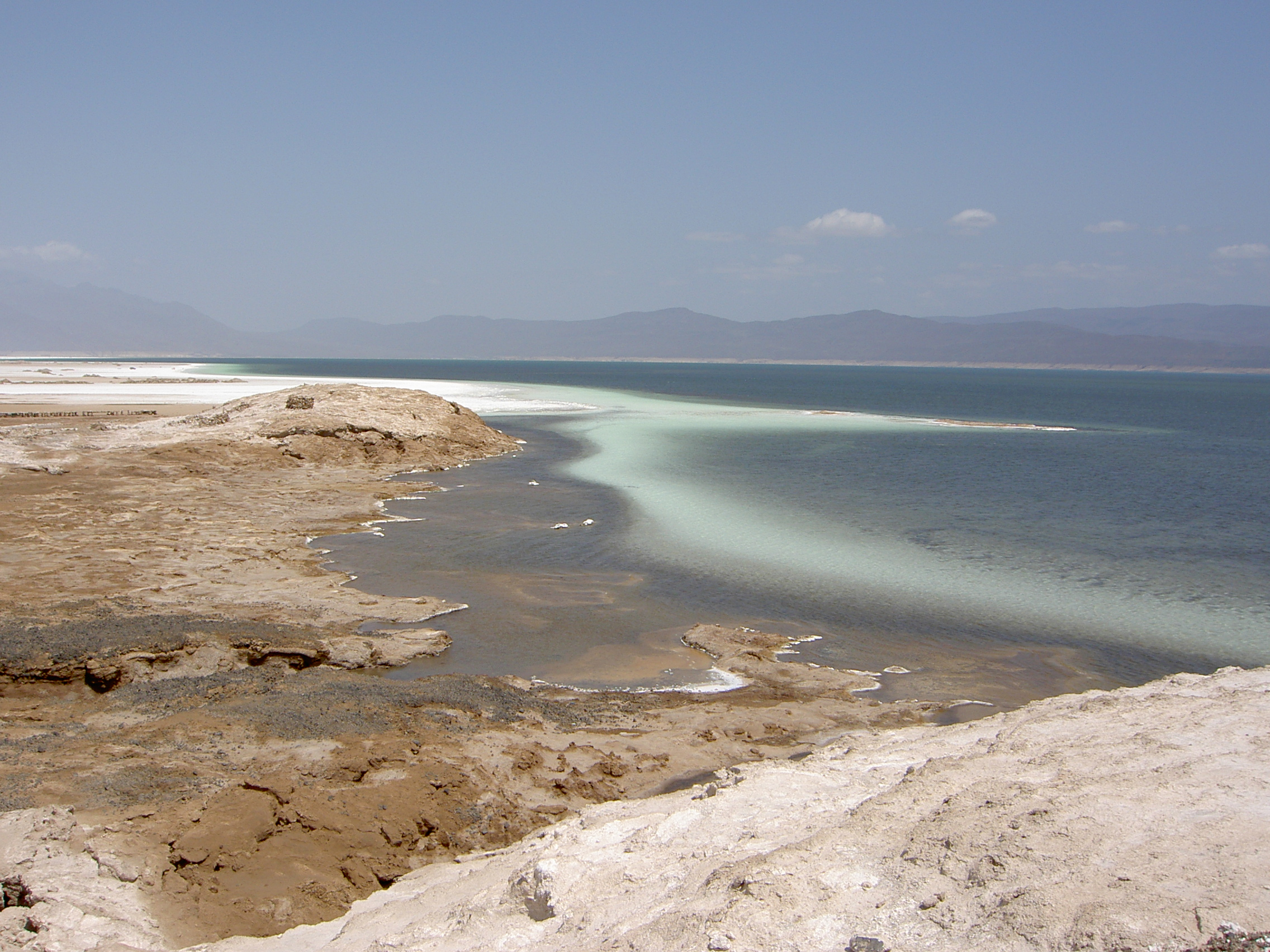
Lake Assal, with the salt pan on the left

Lake Assal is located in the middle of Djibouti, in a closed depression at the northern end of the Great Rift Valley. Situated in the Danakil Desert, it is bounded by hills on the western region. The lake lies at an elevation of 155 m (509 ft) below sea level, making it the lowest point of Africa. The lake is characterized by two parts. The dry part of the lake, resulting from evaporation of the lake waters, is a white plain dry lake bed on the west/northwest side, which is a large expanse of salt. The second part is the highly saline water body. The watershed area of the lake is 900 km^{2} (350 sq mi).

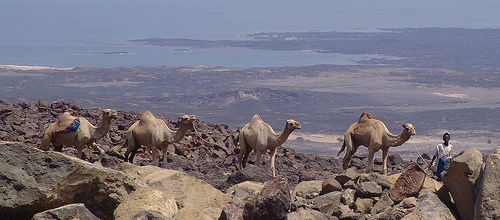
Lake Assal's caravan route

Lake Assal, in an oval shape (length 19 km (12 mi) and width 6.5 km (4.0 mi)), consists of two distinct parts; one is "crystallised salt surface" zone of 68 km^{2} (26 sq mi) and the other is the high saline brine area of 54 km^{2} (21 sq mi). The crystallised salt zone extends to a depth of more than 60 m (200 ft) whose estimated resource is about 300 million tonnes. The lake measures 10 by 7 km (6.2 by 4.3 mi) and has an area of liquid brine 54 km^{2} (21 sq mi). The maximum depth is 40 m (130 ft), whereas the mean depth is 7.4 m (24 ft), which makes for a water volume of 400 million cubic metres (320,000 acre⋅ft).

Salt extraction by the Afar nomad tribes of camel drivers and Issas from Lake Assal's salt bank established the ancient caravan routes. These linked the lake with the mountains of Ethiopia for barter trading such items as sorghum, coal, and other commodities. Salt was also bartered with South Abyssinia for items like coffee, ivory, musk, and also (historically) slaves. It was a source of wealth for the local tribes. Since 1990, industrial mining has been revived with development of roads linking with the Ghoubbet-el-Kharab bay by the Gulf of Tadjoura. The present road to Lake Assal is paved. The lake is 120 km (75 mi) from Djibouti city.

It is also reported that the lake water level is receding as discerned from a 50-foot (15 m) mark on the banks of the lake from the present water level.

== Climate ==
Located in the hot desert, the lake experiences summer temperatures as high as 52 °C (126 °F) from May to September. Winter temperatures are not low at 34 °C (93 °F) from October to April, with the coastal area experiencing rains. Strong, dry, hot winds are part of the environment. The monthly temperature variation is reported to be 6 °C (11 °F). During the summer season, the dry hot winds blow in two directions; namely, the Sabo winds from the southwest and the Khamsin winds from the northwest. Winds during October and April blow from the east, resulting in sporadic rains.

Incidence of rainfall varies widely with January, April, May, and October recording rains. June to August are dry months. The mean annual rainfall in 1993 and 1997 was reported as 773 mm (30.4 in) and 381 mm (15.0 in), respectively. The lowest rainfall of 23 mm (0.91 in) was recorded in 1996.

Water temperature of the lake is reported to reach 33–34 °C (91–93 °F). However, when the wind velocity and evaporation are low, the temperature recorded was found to be 20 °C (68 °F) for surface water and above 25 °C (77 °F) at shallow depths of the lake. The lake water colour also changes over the duration of the day, at times appearing in fluorescent colours. In the middle of the day, the water looks unusual with its emerald color on the background of the snow-white shore.

== Geology ==
=== History ===
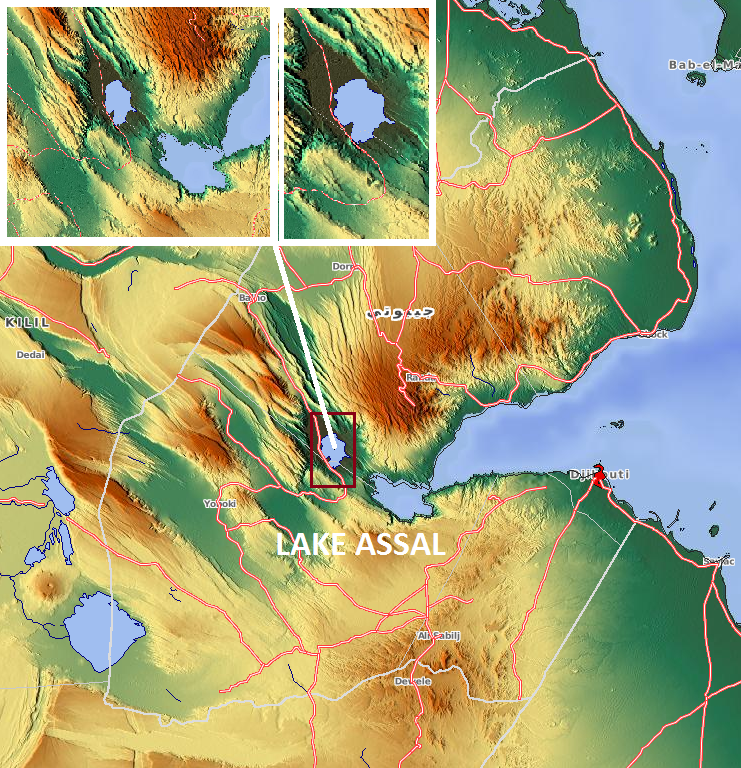
Lake Assal

The lake's geological history was studied by French geologists who compared it with the geology of Danakil lakes. According to this study, the lake originally contained freshwater overlying the 15 m (49 ft) mantle of tufas, marls and calcretes. At an elevation of 100 m (330 ft) "Melanoides tubeculatus (Melania tuberculata), Corbicula consobrina and Coelatura teretiuscula" were reported "resting on the basalts". At the present bed level, the formations of marls with Ervilius purpura and cerithium sp., are indicative of gradual transformation over the centuries to saline water lake; the reason could be on account of lagoon or marine intrusion. Diatomite with Navicula sp., kankar and nodules of gypsum are discerned above the saline band. These bands are converted into gypsiferous layers succeeded by rock salt layers; these layers are seen up to the lake level.

=== Evolution ===
Two interpretations have been considered for the evolution of the present highly saline lake over the rock salt layers. One view, by Degoutin, is that the lake was flooded by the sea from the Ghoubbet el Kharâb, and the second view is by Dreyfuss who attributes it to the rise in sea level resulting in subterranean flows that were established to the lake from the sea.

Another theory mooted by the explorer Major Harris is that the volcanic convulsions could have been the cause for severing the original link of the lake with the Gulf of Tadjoura. This has been further substantiated by the level difference of 570 ft (170 m) between the gulf and the lake level and if this depth is added to that of the lake, the level becomes 676 ft (206 m) which is the level that exists at the head of the Ghoubbet el Kharâb.

The geological setup around Lake Assal consists of volcanic basalt (3.4 – 1.0 Mya) formations. The nearest volcano to the lake, to its southeast, is the Ardoukôka, about 3 km (1.9 mi) away from the shores of the lake, which is marked on topographic map with (-) 80 m (260 ft) contour line. The southern part of the lake has sand patches whose width varies from about 1–6 km (0.62–3.73 mi). There is hardly any arable land in the catchment. The important feature, from the point of view of the sources of water to the lake, is the Assal-Ghoubbet Rift, which is formed of recent basaltic formations (less than 1 Mya).

Considering its geological evolution, the lake periphery now has crystal bands of salt and remarkable white gypsum above which are the distinct overlay of black basalt formations.

== Hydrology ==
The watershed area of the lake measures 900 km^{2} (350 sq mi). There is a residual surface runoff of fresh water into the lake from the sporadic rainfall from ephemeral streams; there are no defined streams in the catchment. Runoff from rainfall is in the form of flash floods which may last from several hours up to two or three days depending on the intensity of rainfall. This flow pattern affects the lake by inundating the salt pans. Temporary water courses are identified in the southern part of the lake, while the Kalou River valley has a permanent water source.

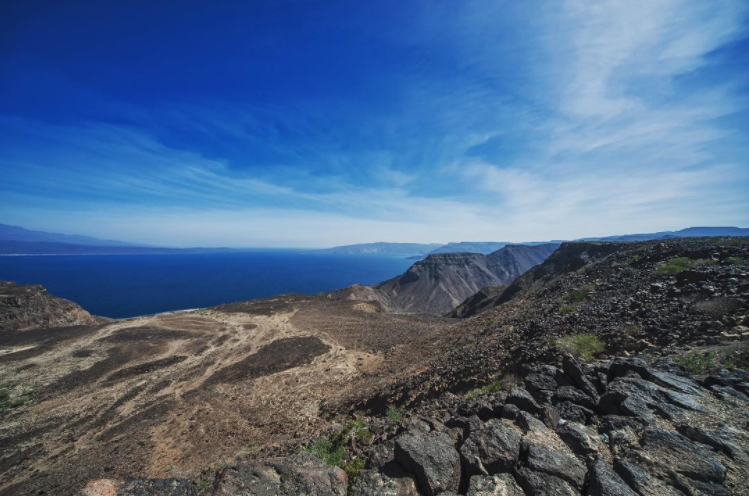
Bay of Ghoubbet, sources of water to Lake Assal

The main source of supply, however, is subsurface geothermal springs with aquifers linked to the sea water from the Ghoubbet El Kharab bay, which is 10 km (6.2 mi) to the southeast of the lake. The bay is part of the Gulf of Tadjoura, a western extension of the Gulf of Aden. The subterranean flow from the Gulf of Ghoubbet of the Red Sea is through a fissured channel of 5 km (3.1 mi) length by gravity in basalt formations of mountains existing on the east side of Lake Assal, as spring. The spring that emerges into the lake has a salt content of 39 g/L which is close to that of seawater. The lake water fluctuates by about 1.5 m (4.9 ft) with subsurface inflow estimated at 5,000–8,000 litres (1,321–2,113 US gallons) per second. The seawater-derived geothermal aquifer of the Asal-Fiale area is located in an exposed and actively extending continental rift that will become an arm of the Red Sea. In particular, Lake Assal is eligible as an experimental site to study the evolution of the deep hot brines of the Red Sea. Indeed, by observing the strontium composition of the Red Sea brines, it is easy to deduce how these salt waters found at the bottom of the Red Sea could have evolved in a similar way to Lake Assal, which ideally represents their compositional extreme.

== Demographics ==
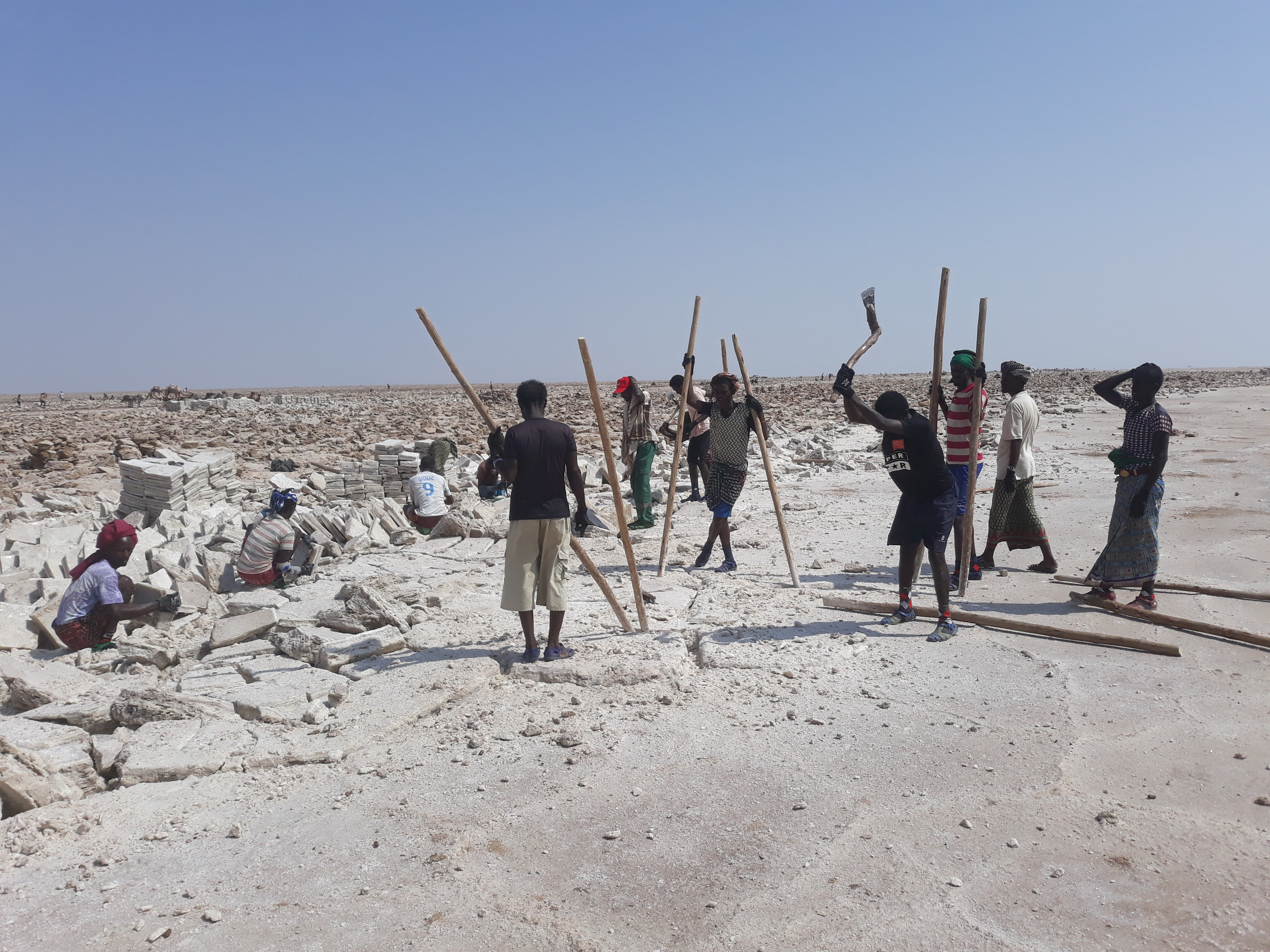
Afar Salt Miners

The lake precincts are inhabited by Afar people who extract salt from the lake for trading for their living. The Economic Development of Lake Assal has assessed the population of the Assal region as a whole at 20,000. Now, a settlement of 2,000 people has been established near the lake.

== Wildlife ==
The vegetation in the lake area consists only of scattered, low, thorny bushes or shrubs on the right bank shores, except for one lone palm tree which is bypassed by the road.

The lake water is rich in minerals but the only signs of life are a rich abundance of common bacteria. The region has witnessed terrestrial fauna species of antelopes (small buck near the stream beds), camels, birds, lizards and insects. The lake area does not support any kind of aqua fauna. However, near the hot spring source to Lake Assal, some shoals of minnow fish species are reported, which are said to be similar to Cyprinodon variegatus which is a common species found in the Caribbean and South American salt works.

== Chemical composition ==
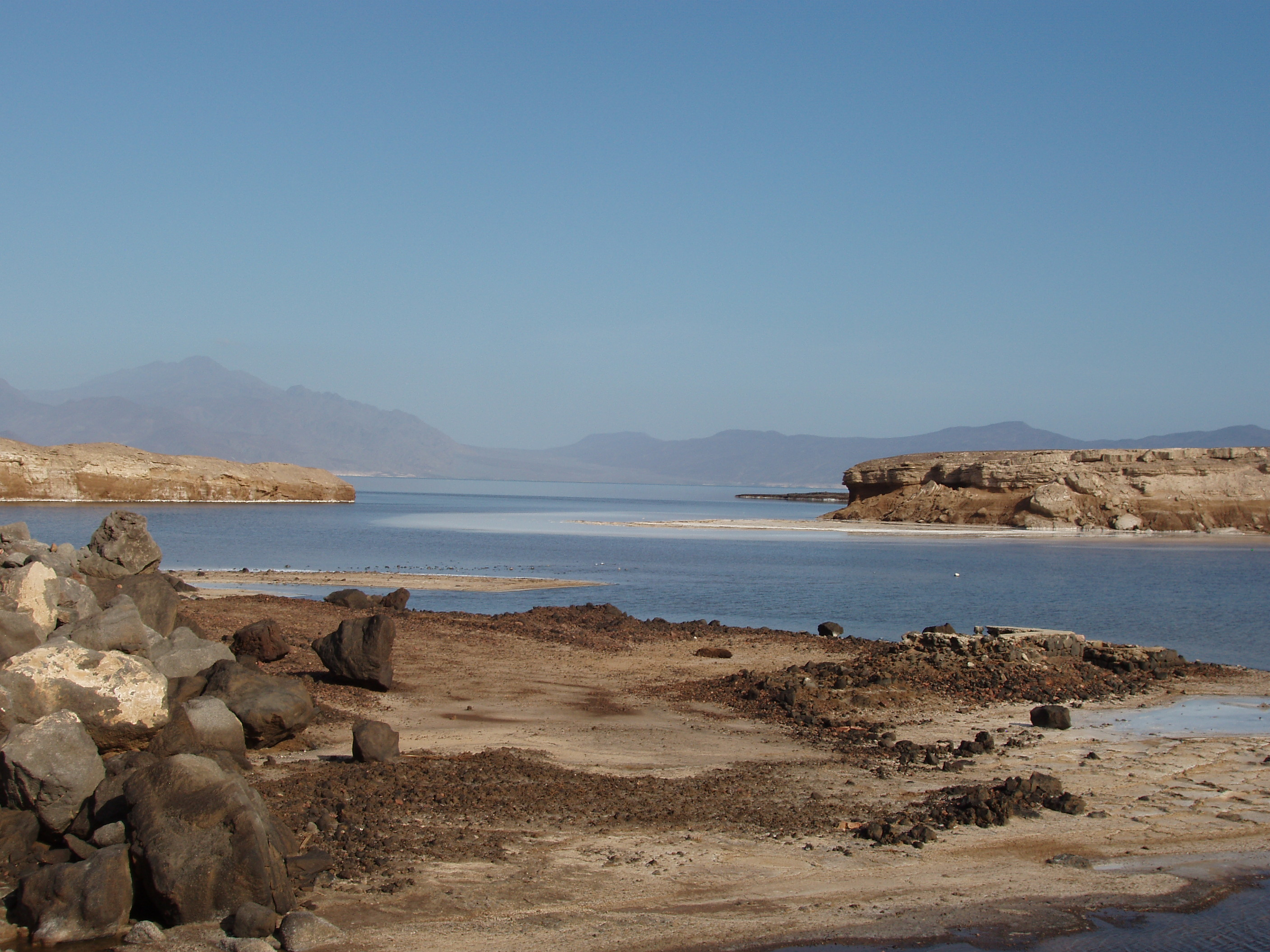
Lake Assal

The chemical composition of the lake water is 300 g/L NaCl which is assessed with varying potential reserves of 4 to 8 million tonnes. The hot spring, which is source of supply to Lake Assal from the gulf, has the same salinity level as that of seawater. The salinity concentration in the lake is a result of wind and sun action, which results in an annual average evaporation rate of 460 million m^{3}. The lake water is stated to be maintaining an equilibrium.

Lake Assal is the most saline body of water on earth after Don Juan Pond with 34.8% average salt concentration (up to 40% at 20 m (66 ft) depth); higher than the 33.7% level in the Dead Sea. The dissolved salts include NaCl, KCl, MgCl_{2}, CaCl_{2}, CaSO_{4} and MgBr_{2}, with NaCl dominating in Lake Assal and MgCl_{2} in the Dead Sea. The surface concentration of salts is 268.8 g/L for the Dead Sea and 276.5 g/L for Lake Assal; the concentration increases to 326.6 g/L at 50 m (160 ft) depth in the Dead Sea and to 398 g/L at 20 m (66 ft) depth in Lake Assal.

== Salt extraction ==
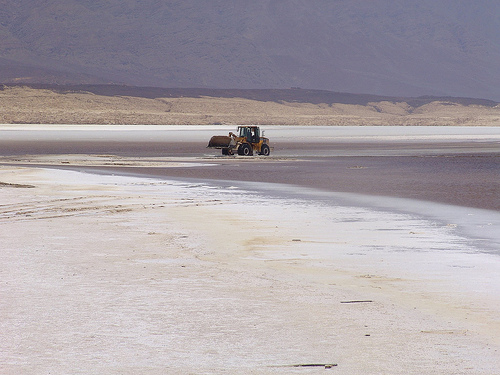
Sand pans extracted by industrial process

By 1893, the French government had sold to businessman Léon Chefneux the right to refine and export salt from Lake Assal. Chefneux agreed to pay into the colonial office the sum of $10,000 a year, and if, during the fifty years that he was to have the exclusive right to export salt from Lake Assal, the annual product exceeded 50,000 tonnes, he was to pay a tax of 20 cents for every tonne in excess. The government also designated a part of the lake where the local people could procure all the salt they wanted without tax or hindrance.

Salt production on a semi-commercial basis started in 1988 by small private enterprises. Thereafter, extraction of salt from the lake peaked in 1998–2000 when there was a conflict between Eritrea and Ethiopia. Djibouti replaced Eritrea in supplying salt to Ethiopia at highly attractive prices (250% of the earlier sale price) when it came to be known as the "white gold." Commercial industrial production rose between 2004 and 2008. In 2004, after an initial low of 17,745 tonnes due to import duty of 53% imposed by Ethiopian exports, production increased and recorded a high of 110,000 tonnes in 2008. However, since 2008 the production has increased manifold as a result of the Government of Djibouti Department of Industries initiating action plans, in 2002, to expand the salt extraction process from Lake Assal by adopting modern mechanical processes so that a crude salt production of 6 million tonnes could be achieved annually, eventually. After instituting a feasibility study for the purpose, the Salt Investment S.A., in a joint agreement, in March 2008, between Emerging Capital Partners LLC (ECP), Société d’Exploitation du Lac (SEL) and Hardtechnologies Group S.L. ("Hardtech"), have been made responsible for "developing the salt project further and are established under the laws of Djibouti for the purposes of harvesting, refining, storing, transporting and exporting salt extracted from Lake Assal." The project envisages extraction at the rate of 1,000 tonnes per hour, supported by a 250 tonnes per hour mechanical salt washing and upgrading plant. The target of 4 million tonnes was expected to be achieved by 2012.

While most commercial salt extractions are done from the huge deposits on the shores of the lake, there is also another novel way of extraction done by wading through the lake waters. The extracted salt is found in the form of spheres formed out of salt crystals and marketed in the name of Djibouti salts. The extraction process involves whole family of indigenous people wading through the lake. Men wade deep into the lake and gather the pearls in baskets. Women help in sorting the collected spheres according to size by hand. They are then dried, stored in bags and transported to the harbour for sale.

=== Development projects ===
The geothermal resources of this rift valley surrounding Lake Assal, which shows a high temperature variation, was studied for development in the Fiale area near Lava Lake, about 8 km (5.0 mi) north of Lake Assal. It is proposed to establish a geothermal power station of 30 MW capacity. Wind power potential available in the Lake Assal area is also proposed to be exploited with a Wind Power station about 500 m (1,600 ft) from Lake Assal, near the geothermal plant.

Considering the seismic and volcanic activity in the lake region, exploration for mineral deposits of gold was initiated in 2001 jointly by Djibouti and an American company.

The Lake Assal area, the Ghoubbet El Kharab bay and the Ardoukoba Volcano were proposed to be developed as tourist attractions.

== See also ==
- Lake Afrera

== Sources ==
- Microbiological Study of a Hypersaline Lake in French Somaliland
