= History of Puntland =

Aspects of regional history of Puntland

Puntland (Somali: Taariikhda Buntilaan), (Arabic: تاريخ أرض البنط), (Spanish: Historia de Puntlandia), officially the Puntland State of Somalia (Somali: Maamul-Goboleedka Buntilaan ee Soomaaliya), Arabic: ولاية أرض البنط الصومالية), is a Federal Member State in northeastern Somalia. The Administrative Capital is Garowe in the Nugal region, and its leaders declared the territory an autonomous state in 1998. Geographically to the west, Puntland lays claim to the intra-46th meridian territories that were outside European colonial rule during parts of the Scramble for Africa period.

== Ancient times ==
Ancient Egyptian archaeological sites preserve historical documentation about the trade relations between ancient Egypt and the nations situated along the Red Sea coastline. These records indicate the existence of a trading partner known as Land of Punt, which is believed to have inspired the naming of the present-day region of Puntland. Nevertheless, it remains uncertain whether the ancient Puntland corresponded directly to the location of today's Puntland..

== Modern times ==
Additional subgroups of the Harti clan, a division of the "Darod" Somali tribes, including the Majeerteen, Dhulbahante, Warsangali, Deshiishe, and KaskiQabe, inhabited the geographical region encompassing what is now known as Puntland.

The Majeerteen clans had established the Majeerteen Sultanate, which was situated at the easternmost point of the Horn of Africa, around 1600. However, at the onset of the 20th century, an internal conflict arose within the clan, which was subsequently exploited by Italy, resulting in the clan's incorporation as an Italian protectorate.

The Dhulbahante tribe's settlement, located slightly to the west of the Majeerteen community, came under British protection towards the end of the 19th century. However, following the passing of Sayid Muhammad in 1920, it returned to being under British protection once again.

The Warsangali clan is predominantly situated in Las Khorey and other regions of northern Somalia. According to a historian narrator, the clan traces its origins back over 800 years. However, it wasn't until 1897 that the clan leader assumed the title of Sultan, succeeding Mohamed Ali Sireh. Mohammed Ali Sireh had previously entered into a treaty with the British to establish a protectorate but later chose to join Sayyid Muhammad's rebellion. Following the conclusion of the rebellion, Mohammed Ali was subsequently deported, and the Warsangali community reverted to British protection.

Consequently, within the Harti clans, the Majeerteen tribes' community was integrated into Italian Somaliland, whereas the Dhulbahante and Warsangali tribes became part of British Somaliland. This division of territories under the Italian and British administrations was a contributing factor to the Puntland–Somaliland conflict in 2007.

== The Republic of Somalia and the Coup ==
In 1960, the formation of the Republic of Somalia occurred through the unification of Italian Somaliland and British Somaliland. The Harti clan, which eventually gained independence as Puntland, held significant governmental roles during this period. Notably, members of the Harti clan were appointed to key positions within the government, including the election of Somalia's inaugural and subsequent prime ministers, as well as the second president.

Mohamed Siad Barre, who took power in a coup, served as the third president of Somalia. He hailed from the Marehan clan, which, despite being part of the broader Darod, differed from the Kablalah, Harti sub-clan. Towards the end of his regime, Barre exhibited favoritism towards his own Marehan clan. In 1978, an unsuccessful coup attempt was made by the elite of Mohamoud Suleiman, a sub-family of the Majeerteen, resulting in the execution of numerous individuals. Subsequently, in 1981, Abdullahi Yusuf Ahmed, a prominent figure among the surviving Majeerteen members, established the Somali Salvation Democratic Front (SSDF), a paramilitary rebel group. Initially, the SSDF included members from various clans, such as Isak and Hawiye, not exclusively from the Harti clan.

Additionally, three tribes that trace their lineage back to the Darod clan are the Tanade, Awrtable, and Eise Darod, These tribes settled in the central and northern eastern regions of Somalia and played a role in the establishment of Puntland.

== Establishment of Puntland ==
In the wake of the eruption of the Somali Civil War in 1991, a locally initiated constitutional conference took place in Garowe in 1998, spanning a three-month period. This conference brought together prominent figures in the region's political sphere, traditional elders (Issims), members of the business community, intrapreneurs, and representatives from civil society. The objective was to establish the autonomous Puntland State of Somalia, with the aim of providing essential services to the population, ensuring security, facilitating trade, and engaging with both domestic and international partners. Abdullahi Yusuf Ahmed assumed the role of the inaugural president of this fledgling state.

As outlined in Article 1 of the Transitional Federal Charter of the Somali Republic, Puntland is recognized as an integral part of the Federal State of Somalia. Consequently, the region actively seeks the unity of the Somali people and upholds a federal system of governance. Unlike the separatist region of Somaliland located to its west, Puntland does not pursue international recognition as an independent nation. Nevertheless, both regions share a common reliance on clan elders and organizational structures that are rooted in clan relationships and kinship ties.

However, a significant distinction exists between Puntland and Somaliland. Puntland was established as a descendant-based entity, with its formation rooted in the concept of providing a "homeland" for the Harti community residing in northern Somalia. Within this framework, the Majeerteen clan played a central role as the primary architects of the establishment of Puntland. Since its inception in 1998, Puntland has also been engaged in territorial disputes with Somaliland concerning the Sool, Sanaag, and Cayn regions.

Abdullahi Yusuf Ahmed hailed from the Omar Mohamoud lineage within the Majeerteen clan. Following his presidency, the position of President of Puntland has been subject to contention, occasionally leading to confrontations, among the influential major branches of the Mohamoud Suleiman sub-clan. These major branches include Omar Mohamoud, Osman Mohamoud, and Eise Mohamoud. According to certain traditional elders, it is suggested that Mohamoud Suleiman had more than three sons.

== Extension and power struggle ==
In July 2001, the Chief Justice of Puntland, Yusuf Haji Nur declared himself the acting President of Puntland following the expiration of Ahmed's presidential term. However, Abdullahi Yusuf Ahmed disputed Nur's claim and maintained that he was the rightful President, Yusuf Haji Nur served as the interim President starting from July 1, 2001 - November 14, 2001, in the office of the president as interim.

In November 2001, Abdullahi Yusuf Ahmed, the first president of Puntland, was forcibly removed from the capital by the opposition after he refused to leave office despite his term expiring. The opposition convened a council and elected Jama Ali Jama as the new president. Yusuf Haji Nur, who had previously declared himself acting president, handed over the position to the newly elected president, Jama Ali Jama. This power struggle led to a two-year civil war in Puntland. Jama assumed the role of acting president on November 14, 2001, but his tenure was short-lived, lasting only six days until November 21, 2001.

In 2003, Mohamud Muse Hersi Adde, a former Lieutenant general, organized a militia group consisting primarily of members from the Osman Mohamoud sub-clan of Majeerteen. They established a base in Somaliland. General Adde's forces attempted two unsuccessful attacks on Puntland from their base in El Afweyn. In response to the escalating conflict, traditional elders from Puntland intervened and facilitated a peace agreement between General Adde Muse and Abdullahi Yusuf Ahmed.

The peace agreement, signed in May 2003, led to a collaboration between the two leaders, with their forces combining and power being shared between them, Ahmed then regained the presidency and served his second term from 2003, until October 14, 2004.

After Yusuf's election as President of the Transitional Federal Government (TFG) in October, the Vice President at that time, Mohamed Abdi Hashi, took over the presidency of Puntland. His interim term as President lasted from October 14, 2004, to January 8, 2005.

== Resurrection of President Ahmed ==
Yusuf fought back with the support of the SRRC and neighboring Ethiopia, and by the end of November 2001 had almost retaken Garowe, the capital of Puntland, and by May 2002 was in full control. Jama moved its stronghold to the major northern city of Bosaso, which was also soon overrun, and control of Puntland almost returned to Yusuf.

In 2004, one of Somalia's major media outlets, the radio station Garowe Online, was opened.

In October 2004, Puntland President Yusuf was elected the first president of the Somali Transitional Federal Government, so Puntland President Mohamed Abdi Hashi succeeded him on an interim basis.

Puntland was hit by the tsunami caused by the Sumatra earthquake in December 2004.

== General Adde Muse administration ==
In January 2005, following elections, Major General Mohamoud Muse Hersy, commonly known as "Adde Muse," was elected as the President of Puntland. Puntland no longer functions as an independent nation but operates as an autonomous state within the Somali Transitional Federal Government. Since 2005, the administration of each district has primarily been determined by district councils, with clans serving as the fundamental unit of governance.

The government formed under the leadership of Adde Muse represents a coalition between the Omar Mohamoud and Eise Mohamoud clans, while Adde Muse himself belongs to the Osman Mohamoud clan. This coalition arrangement has shaped the new government structure in Puntland.

It is important to highlight that during that period, there was a significant escalation of pirate activities off the coast of Somalia. Despite the official denial by the Puntland government of any association with pirates, it is worth noting that the financing required for presidential elections involved substantial sums of money. It is worth noting that during this time, the Horn of Africa region experienced a significant influx of funds derived from piracy activities, which had a notable impact on the local economic dynamics.

In March 2005, President Adde initiated plans for the renovation of Bossaso Airport, also known as Benderqasim International Airport, located in Puntland's prominent commercial city. President Adde personally visited Bosaso International Airport and laid the foundation stone for the renovation project in 2006. Subsequently, the construction of the new terminal building commenced and was successfully completed in 2008. President Adde revisited the site in August 2007 to assess the progress.

However, the project encountered various challenges, primarily stemming from financial difficulties. Following the conclusion of the Adde Muse administration in 2009, funding was eventually secured, leading to a bidding ceremony held in 2013. Construction officially commenced in 2014, culminating in the reopening of the new terminal in January 2016.

In November 2006, reports emerged stating that the Islamic Courts Union, an Islamic fundamentalist organization established in southern Somalia, was progressively expanding its influence towards the north and had taken control of Banderadley, situated a few tens of kilometers southwest of Galkayo, a city located on the southern border of Puntland. Mohamed Mohamud Jama, a member of the Union of Courts, declared intentions to invade Galkayo next. Galkayo was a city divided, with the northern half predominantly under Puntland's control and the southern half under Galmudug's influence. Up until this point, the Islamic Courts had refrained from openly declaring an invasion of areas controlled by Puntland.

To prevent the situation from escalating into a religious conflict, Puntland's President, Adde Muse, issued a statement emphasizing that Puntland would be governed in accordance with Islamic law, but with different approaches compared to those of the Union of Courts. The objective was to maintain a clear distinction between the governance methodologies of Puntland and the Union of Courts, thereby avoiding the issue becoming solely a religious matter.

In April 2007, President Adde Muse embarked on a visit to the Emirate of Ras al-Khaimah, one of the constituent states of the United Arab Emirates. During his visit, President Adde held a meeting with Sheikh Saud bin Saqr Al Qasimi, who was then the Crown Prince of Ras al-Khaimah. This meeting resulted in the signing of an economic agreement aimed at enhancing business cooperation between Puntland and Ras al-Khaimah.

Furthermore, an agreement was reached to establish the Puntland Hydrocarbon Development Company LLC, indicating a mutual interest in the development of hydrocarbon resources. Additionally, both parties signed a plan aimed at advancing Puntland's infrastructure program, highlighting the commitment to improving the region's infrastructure.

Another significant agreement entailed the establishment of a quarantine facility for livestock imported from Somalia, highlighting the importance of ensuring the health and safety of livestock during the importation process. This agreement aimed to facilitate the smooth and secure import of livestock into Puntland while adhering to proper quarantine measures.

In July 2007, the Warsangali, a sub-clan of the Harti branch within the Kablalah Darod, declared their independence under the name "Makhir" in a specific area of western Puntland. This declaration of independence stemmed from their grievances concerning the perceived lack of equitable sharing of high positions and resources within Puntland. The Warsangali clan felt marginalized and sought to establish their own autonomous entity in order to address their concerns.

In October 2007, Somaliland, the neighboring state to the west of Puntland, took control of Las Anod, a city located in the Sool region. This region is claimed by both Puntland and Somaliland, marking the beginning of the Puntland–Somaliland dispute. The occupation of Las Anod by Somaliland further exacerbated the tensions and territorial disagreements between the two States.

In December 2007, the Puntland Parliament faced disruptions when a Member of Parliament from the Sool region raised concerns regarding a covert agreement between Somaliland and President Adde Muse pertaining to the invasion of Las Anod. These revelations created turmoil within the parliamentary proceedings, shedding light on potential secret arrangements. Simultaneously, in December, President Adde Muse made the decision to dissolve the Galkayo District Council and announced that the Puntland government would assume direct control over Galkayo. This move by Adde Muse was aimed at consolidating and strengthening the authority of the Puntland government.

In the following January, Adde Muse declared his intention to retake Las Anod, emphasizing Puntland's resolve to reclaim control over the city. This statement underscored Adde Muse's determination to assert Puntland's territorial claims and regain authority over the region.

In August 2008, Abdullahi Ahmed Jama, also known as Ilka-Jiir, a brigadier general hailing from the Warsangali clan, returned from Maakhir State and declared his candidacy for the presidency of Puntland. As part of his campaign, he pledged to address the concerns and improve the treatment of the Sanaag region within Puntland. Ilka-Jiir received a warm welcome from the residents of Badhan and Dhahar, showcasing their support for his candidacy.

Due to the intensifying attacks by Somaliland separatists on the SSC (Sool, Sanaag, and Cayn) regions, Ilka-Jiir made the decision to return to Puntland in 2009. Recognizing the security challenges faced by these regions, he believed it was crucial to be actively present in Puntland to address the ongoing issues and provide support to the affected communities.

In October 2008, Adde Muse signed a contract with the Lootah Group, a United Arab Emirates company, to build an airport, port, and highway for 170 million UAE dirhams (about $5 billion).

== Farole administration ==
In January 2009, the election results saw the victory of Abdulrahman Mohamed Mohamoud, "Farole", an individual hailing from the Isse Mohamoud sub-clan of Majeerteen, as the newly elected president of Puntland. Farole, who holds a Ph.D. in history from La Trobe University in Australia, had previously served as the finance minister in the government under President Adde. However, he left Puntland in 2006 following a dispute with Adde Muse regarding an oil exploration project conducted by Conoco and Daror.

At the behest of various political groups, Farole returned to Puntland to participate in the election. Upon assuming office, President Farole promptly introduced his "100 Days Report" policy, which entailed his commitment to embark on a countryside tour and prioritize initiatives related to local autonomy and anti-piracy measures during his initial 100 days in power. This policy emphasized his focus on addressing the needs of local communities and tackling the issue of piracy, which had been a pressing concern for Puntland.

President Farole was from the Isse Mohamoud clan, which means that the three most powerful clans in Puntland, Omar Mohamoud, Osman Mohamoud, and Isse Mohamoud, have now each had a president.

On May 22, 2009, the Puntland Social Welfare Agency was established. The agency also aims to help internally displaced persons and orphanages in Puntland and was budgeted at 960 million Somali shillings (US$32,000) in 2009.

In June 2009, a new draft constitution was passed by the Puntland Parliament with a majority of votes in favor, with the main idea being to introduce a multi-party system in Puntland. The "parties" were in effect clan groups, and the number of seats was allocated to each clan according to its power.

Security in Puntland is still poor, and between August 2009 and January 2010, five high-ranking government officials were assassinated. On the other hand, inter-clan conflicts have gradually come to an end. For example, the conflict in the Igdhays valley in the Bali area resulted in 30 deaths and many injuries, but a peace agreement was reached on October 22, 2009, with the intervention of the Puntland government. In June 2010, seven people were killed in a battle in Qardho, but the Puntland government forces were deployed to stop the fighting.

In May 2010, civil servants' salaries, which had been delayed since the founding of Puntland, were paid consistently every month.

On July 16, 2010, Puntland's Autonomy Secretary announced that the Puntland Cabinets had approved a new anti-terrorism law. It is believed to be mainly to counter the Islamic terrorist organization Al-Shabaab.

In January 2012, Africa Oil Corp., a Canadian company, initiated oil exploration activities in Puntland. Somalia, although relatively lacking in underground resources, holds the potential for oil extraction, considering successful oil drilling operations in neighboring countries such as Ethiopia and Kenya. Currently, exploration efforts are focused on the region near the Daror Valley. However, no oil discoveries have been made thus far. Furthermore, even if oil reserves were to be found, the issue of resource ownership and distribution between the central government of Somalia and the Puntland government remains unclear at this stage.

On April 15, 2012, Puntland's new constitution was officially retrieved.

== Gaas administration ==
On January 8, 2014, The Puntland presidential election took place as scheduled, resulting in the election of Abdiweli Gaas as Puntland's sixth president. Gaas, who had previously served as Somalia's prime minister and holds a Ph.D. in economics, was anticipated to bring about positive developments and improvements in Puntland. Notably, he secured the presidency with a narrow margin of one vote, succeeding President Farole in his role.

The Gaas administration, however, became increasingly corrupt in the bureaucracy, leading to hyperinflation.

In September 2016, dozens of soldiers occupied the premises of the Puntland Parliament for non-payment of salaries.

In the 2017 Somali presidential election, similar to the 2012 election, the president was elected through a parliamentary vote. The electoral system utilized at that time was known as the "4.5 formula," which assigned one seat to each of the four major clans (Darod, Hawiye, Rahanweyn, and Dir) in Somalia while allocating 0.5 seats to the remaining minority clans. However, this system faced criticism in Puntland, leading to widespread protests in January 2016, involving hundreds of people. President Gaas responded to the concerns and, during a visit to Toronto, Canada, in March, he announced that he would not endorse the 4.5 formula, even if UN Secretary-General Ban Ki-Moon supported it. However, the following week, he expressed a contradictory statement to Voice of America in Washington, D.C., stating, "I support the 4.5 formula, but the people are against it."

On April 28, 2018, a suicide bombing targeted military personnel in the city of Galkayo, under Puntland control, killing five people. Al-Shabab, which has been active mainly in southern Somalia, has claimed responsibility for this incident.

Conflicts with neighboring Somaliland to the west deteriorated: in May 2018, both Puntland and Somaliland armies were in a state of battle in Tukaraq, Sool region, and the Somaliland army settled Tukaraq city. Both armies built up their forces; in September 2018, President Gaas held a cabinet weekly meeting in Badhan, Sanaag region. Badhan is effectively controlled by Puntland.

== Deni administration ==
Said Abdullahi Deni was elected as President of Puntland on January 8, 2019.

On October 26, 2019, The lawmakers of Puntland, a state in northeastern Somalia, have voted to impeach Speaker Abdihakim Mohamed Ahmed Dhoobo-Daareed. The motion accused him of violating the constitution and mobilizing clan forces within the parliament. The deputy speaker cited divisions caused by the speaker and his alleged involvement in a no-confidence motion against the regional president. The speaker, on the other hand, claimed that Puntland was being controlled by a single clan, excluding others from the capital city. Four people were killed in a standoff related to the impeachment. A new speaker will be chosen within 14 days, and a committee has been appointed for the election process. There are reports of alleged interference from Villa Somalia, aiming to punish President Deni for supporting Ahmed Madobe, the leader of Jubaland. Puntland leaders believe that Mogadishu is destabilizing their government by funding various groups. In April 2024, Puntland announced it would operate as a functionally independent state amid a dispute over Somali constitutional changes. In the days following the announcement, officials representing Puntland and Ethiopia met several times to discuss security, economic, and political cooperation.

== See also ==
- Outline of Puntland
- Oil exploration in Puntland
