= Ministry of Security (Puntland) =

Puntland Government ministry responsible for Security and DDR

- Wasaaradda Amniga ee Dawladda Puntland وزارة الأمن ونزع السلاح والتسريح وإعادة الإدماج في بونتلاند

Agency overview
- Formed: 1 August 1998
- Jurisdiction: Government of Puntland
- Minister responsible: Ibrahim Artan Ismail
- Website: http://www.mos.pl.so/

The Puntland Ministry of Security, Disarmament, Demobilization and Reintegration MoSDDR (Somali: Wasaaradda Amniga ee Dawladda Puntland; Arabic: وزارة الأمن ونزع السلاح والتسريح وإعادة الإدماج في بونتلاند) is Ministry responsible for ensuring security and preventing terrorist acts in the Puntland regions. Several "armed enforcement" units operate under its jurisdiction, including dervish forces, PSF, PISA, PMPF and Puntland police including traffic, immigration, border, security police and other armed police units. The current minister is Ibrahim Artan Ismail 'Haji Bakiin'.

== Establishment ==
After the collapse of the Somali Democratic Republic in 1991 and the establishment of Puntland on August 1, 1998, the Ministry of Interior and Security was formed. Later, the Puntland government split this ministry and created the Ministry of Security and DDR.

Following its inauguration, The ministry declared a policy of demobilization, which involved disbanding armed civilian groups. Disarmament focused on the physical removal of weapons, ammunition and arsenals from former combatants and faction leaders.

The ministry also initiated a reintegration program aimed at restoring the loyalty of former militiamen affiliated with the collapsed Siad Barre regime and various warlords. This process seeks to reintegrate them into civilian society, thereby reducing the number of individuals immediately available for armed conflict.

== List of minister ==
- Khalif Isse Mudan
- Hassan Osman Aloore
- Abdi Hersi Ali Qarjab
- Axmed Abdullahi Yusuf
- Abdisamad Gallan
- Ibrahim Artan Ismail 'Haji Bakiin'
