= Jimale Jama Takar =

Somali military officer

Brig Gen Jimale Jama Takar
- Jimcaale Jaamac Takar جِمْعَالَى جَامَعْ تَاكَار
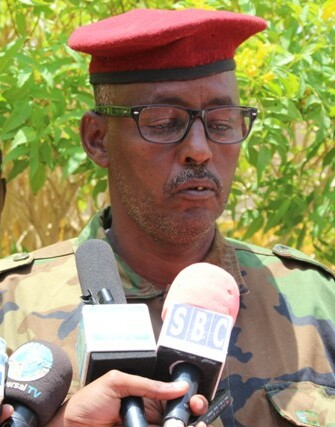
- Military career
- Allegiance: Puntland
- Branch: Puntland Dervish Force
- Rank: Brigadier general
- Unit: 2nd Commando Battalion of Danab Force (Puntland)
- Known for: Counter Terrorism of Puntland
- Conflicts: Galgala campaign and Somali Civil War

General Jim’ale Jama Takar (Somali: Jimcaale Jaamac Takar), (Arabic: جِمْعَالَى جَامَعْ تَاكَار); is a Somali military official and the chief commander of the 2nd Commando Battalion of Danab Force.

== Biography ==
Jimale Jama Takar, a resident of Garoowe, and hailed of the Isse Mohamoud sub-clan of the Majeerteen, Harti, larger Darod tribe, Takar was a member of the 21st battalion stationed in Dusmareb prior to the collapse of the Somali Democratic Republic. He was a prominent figure among the various military factions in Somalia after the government's downfall, and he served as one of the officers of the Somali national forces later Puntland dervish forces.

Over the years, he has collaborated with different administrations in Puntland Government and was appointed to his current position by former President Abdirahman Farole. Under Farole's leadership, Takar received troops who had undergone training in Uganda and Ethiopia.

In May 2023, general Takar relocated to Garowe, where he was leads a rebellion against the Deni administration, along with his loyal forces.

== Puntland forces ==
Brigadier general Jim'ale Jama Takar leads the forces that departed alongside Danab Brigade. This brigade, commanded by General Takar, played a significant role in the conflicts in Puntland. The army consists of General Takar's brigade and other local forces.

They engaged in battles from the Galgala mountains and defended Puntland against attacks by al-Shabaab in regions such as Suuj, Garamaal and Gara'ad. The estimated size of this force ranges between six and seven hundred members. Additionally, the army possesses a variety of firearms and approximately seventy to eighty vehicles or other military equipment.

== Garowe tension ==
On June 21, 2023, between the Puntland Maritime Police Force (PMPF) loyal to President Said Abdullahi Deni and opposition military units led by General Jim’ale Jama Takar. The discord arose from a dispute over constitutional amendments, revealing factional divisions in Puntland's political landscape. General Jim’ale with a history dating back to the 1990s civil war, played a prominent role in the clashes, aligning with opposition forces. His complex involvement, including military operations against al-Shabaab, adds to the ongoing turmoil, raising concerns about Puntland's stability and security.
