= Ibrahim Artan Ismail =

Ibrahim Artan Ismail Bakiin ابراهيم ارتان اسماعيل

Puntland Minister of Security and DDR
- In office 2007–2009
- President: Mohamud Muse Hersi
- Vice President: Hassan Dahir Afqurac

Deputy Minister of Interior of Puntland
- In office 2007–2007

Personal details
- Born: Bari, Puntland
- Party: Independent
- Children: Ahmed Ibrahim Artan

Ibrahim Artan Ismail "Haji Bakiin" (Somali: Ibraahiim Cartan Ismacil "Xaaji Bakiin", Arabic: ابراهيم ارتان اسماعيل) is a Puntland politician currently serving Minister of Security and DDR. He previously served as the Minister of Security of Puntland during Adde Muse administration.

== Career ==
Nicknamed "Haaji Bakiin" (Xaaji Bakiin), Ismail hails Ali Suleiman sub-clan of Majeerteen and born in the northeastern region Bari, Puntland.

He was the Chairman of the northeastern Bari province under the incumbency of former Puntland President Abdullahi Yusuf Ahmed.

In 2007, Ismail was appointed Puntland's Deputy Minister of Interior under regional President Mohamud Muse Hersi. He later served as Minister of Security of Puntland.

Besides politics, Ismail is also a prominent entrepreneur.
