= Khalif Isse Mudan =

Somali politician (died 2020)

Gen Khalif Isse Mudan
- Khaliif Ciise Mudan
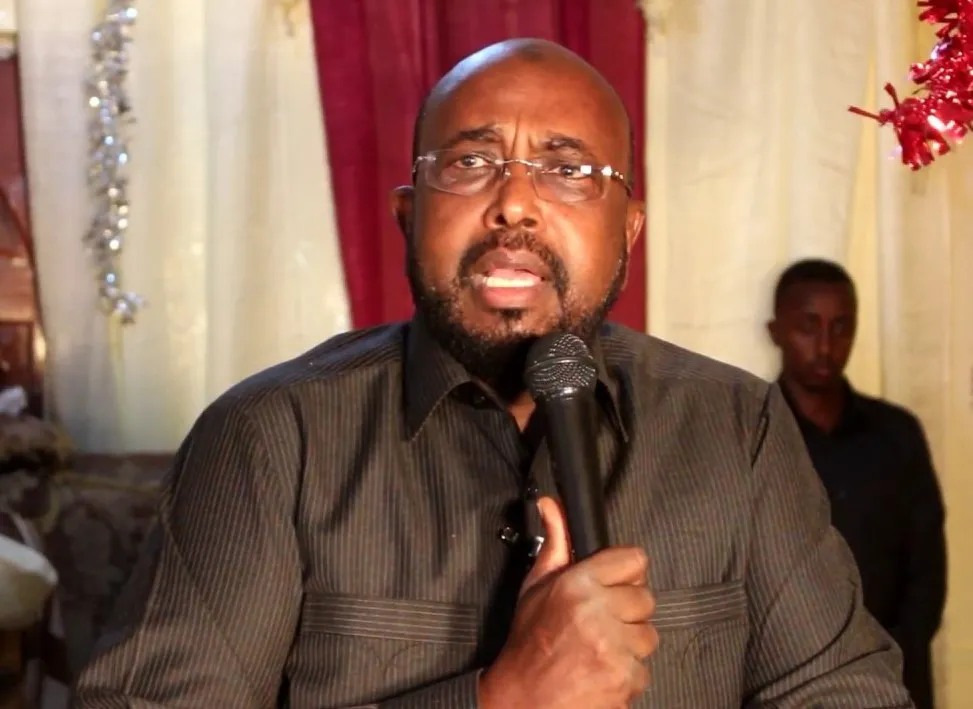

Puntland Minister of Security and DDR
- In office 2011–2014
- President: Abdirahman Farole
- Vice President: Abdisamad Ali Shire
- Preceded by: Mohamed Alore
- Succeeded by: Hassan Osman Aloore

Personal details
- Born: Khaliif Ciise Mudan; 1953 Qardho
- Died: November 24, 2020 (aged 66–67) Ankara, Turkey
- Cause of death: COVID-19

Khalif Isse Mudan (Somali: Jeneraal Khaliif Ciise Mudan) was a Somali politician and Puntland Minister of Security and DDR from 2011 to 2014, and former Somali Air Force Commander. He died in Ankara on November 24, 2020 due to COVID-19.

== Personal life ==
Mudan was born in 1953 in Boosaso, the capital of Bari Region, and he came from (Bah-gareen) Osman Mohamoud sub clan of Majeerteen Darod, and he completed his primary education in Boosaso, especially at Haji Mire School.

He continued his middle and high school education in Mogadishu, where he moved in 1962, and was sent for military training in 1970, when he received pilot training in Russia.

== Career ==
In 1974, he returned to the country and joined the Somali Military Forces, as a senior pilot in the Somali National Army, where he held various ranks until he received the rank of Major in 1977.

In the same year 1977, he was awarded a medal for bravery during the war between Somalia and Ethiopia, in which he achieved many successes as a military pilot.

In 1987 Khalif Isse Mudan received the rank of Colonel, and was appointed the Commander of the Air Force Base in Balli-doogle, a position he has held since 1990, and earned the rank of Brigadier General.

In 1990, Gen. Khalif Isse Mudan was appointed as the Commander of the Somali Air Force, a position he has held since 1991, when the central government of the country fell.

In the years 1991–1998, he worked on the reconciliation and peace of the North-East region, which is now known as Puntland, and in 1998 he became one of the founders of the Puntland government.

On 29 June 2006 Khalif Isse Mudan, as owner/operator of Mudan Airlines, signed a contract in Nairobi with Ali Mohamed Ghedi, Prime Minister of the Transitional Federal Government of Somalia (TFG), granting Mudan Airlines the right to transport weapons and ammunition from Ethiopia to Baidoa for the TFG.

== Death ==
Mudan died at a hospital in Ankara, Turkey, of COVID-19 on November 24, 2020.
