= Jawahir Ahmed =

Somali-American model

Jawahir Ahmed جواهر احمد
- Born: 1991 (age 34–35); Logan, Utah, United States
- Occupation: Model
- Height: 5'8
- Title: Miss Somalia, Miss Africa Utah

Jawahir Ahmed (Somali: Jawaahir Axmed; Arabic: جواهر احمد) is a Somali-American model.

== Personal life ==
Ahmed was born in 1991 in Logan, Utah, to Somali parents. Her family had moved to the United States earlier that year as the civil war in Somalia began. Her family hails from the Osman Mahamoud sub clan of the larger Majeerteen.

As of 2013, Ahmed was studying at the Utah State University on a scholarship, majoring in Health Education with a specialization in Health Sciences. At the same time, she was working for AmeriCorps and the CPASS college preparation program.

== Career ==
As of 2013, Ahmed was signed to the Stars Talent Group modeling agency.

In 2013, she represented Somalia in the Miss Africa Utah pageant, which she wound up winning. She again served as Miss Somalia in the 2013 Miss United Nations USA pageant.
