= Ali Hayan =

Puntland politician died 2013

- Cali Maxamed Hayaan
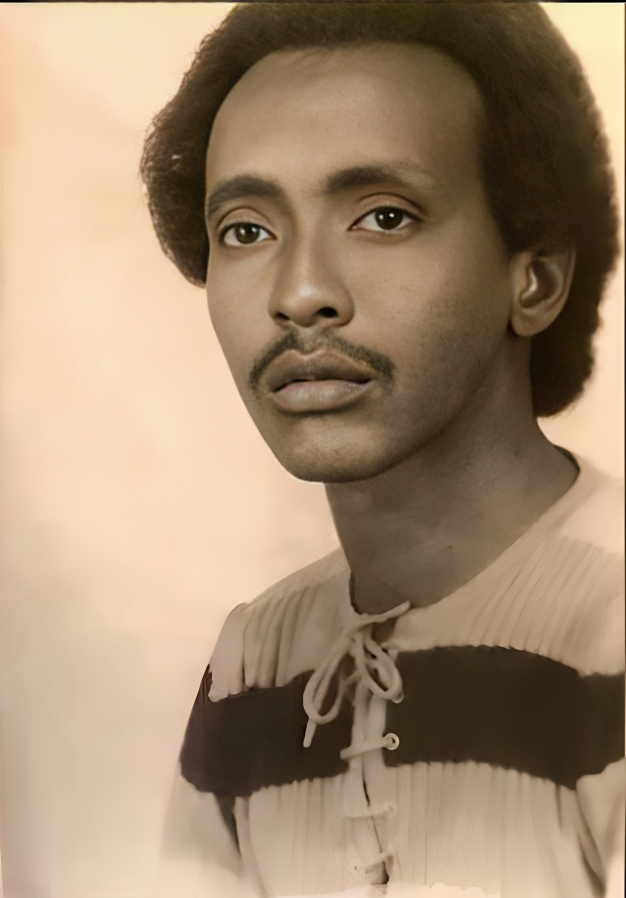

Director of the General Examinations Board Ministry of Education (Somalia)
- In office 1984–1991

Governor of Nugaal
- In office 1994–1996

Director General of Puntland Interior Ministry
- In office 2002 – 8 January 2005

Director General of Puntland Security Ministry
- In office 8 January 2005 – 10 July 2013

Personal details
- Born: 1950 Galkayo, Mudug
- Died: 10 July 2013 (aged 62–63) Garowe Puntland
- Citizenship: Somalia
- Party: Independent
- Children: 9
- Education: Lafoole University
- Occupation: politician; Administrator (role); educator; director general
- Nickname: Hayaan

Ali Mohamed Abdirahman "Ali Hayan" (Somali: Cali Maxamed Cabdiraxmaan "Cali Hayaan"; 1950 - 2013, Arabic: علي محمد عبدالرحمن - علي هيان), widely known as Ali Hayan, was a Somali politician, educator, and administrator. He held various prominent roles in Somalia's education and political sectors, including serving as the Director of the General Examinations Board of the Ministry of Education of Somalia from 1984 to 1991, Governor of the Nugaal Region from 1994 to 1996, and Director General of the Ministries of Interior and Security in Puntland from 2002 to 2013. Ali Hayan is regarded as one of the pillars of the Somali education sector and a founding father of the Puntland education system, recognized for his pivotal role in rebuilding and organizing education after the civil war.

Ali Hayan hailed from Colmarabe branch of the Isse Mohamoud, sub-clan of larger Majeerteen tribe.

== Early life and education ==
Ali Hayan was born in Gaalkacyo, the capital of Mudug region in 1950. After completing his primary education in Gaalkacyo in the mid 1960s, he went to Jamaal Abdinasir School in the capital, Mogadishu, for his secondary school education from 1966 to 1969.

Ali Hayan earned a bachelor's degree with a major in Arabic and a minor in geography from the faculty of education at Lafoole University. He also obtained master's degrees in the same field of education from Egypt and Kuwait in the 1980s.

== Career ==
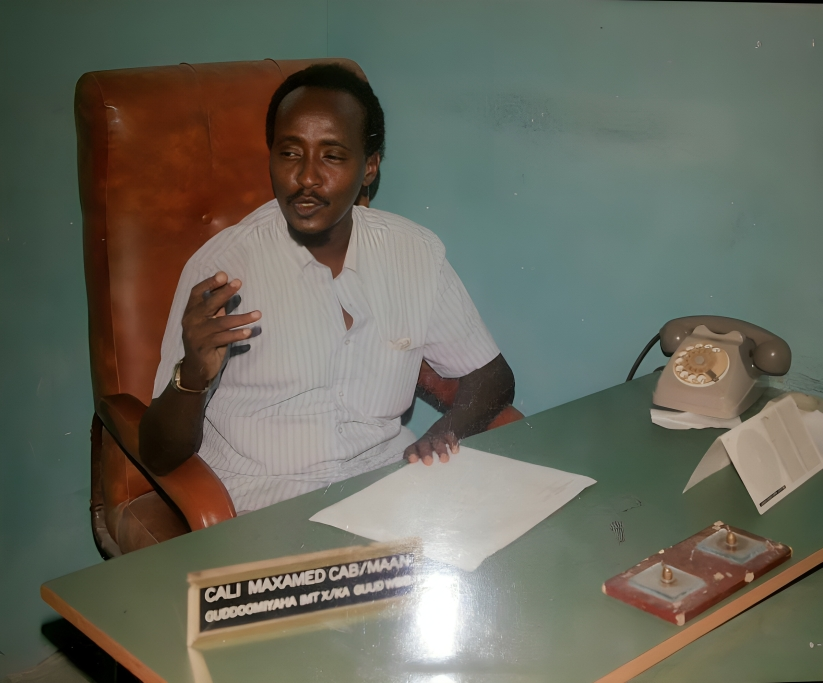
Ali Hayan during his career was the Chairman of the General Examinations Board at the Ministry of Education (Somalia) 1984

From 1969 until the beginning of the 1970s, Hayan worked as a teacher in schools like Eylo School in the Jowhar District. After that, he managed schools in a number of Somali districts, including the town of Ceelbuur in the Galguduud Region.

Ali Hayan joined the Ministry of Education after graduating from Lafoole University and worked the department in charge of secondary schools. From 1984 to 1991, he served as the Chairman of the General Examinations Board of the Ministry of Education of Somalia. Ali gained national recognition for this job, particularly for his well-known signature on the secondary leaving certificates.

When the civil war broke out, Ali Hayan moved to Garoowe, the Nugaal region's capital, in 1993. There, he began the work of rebuilding the region’s educational system after the conflict had destroyed it. His attention was focused on restoring high-quality education in the region.

Ali Hayan served as the Governor of Nugaal Region from 1994 to 1996. He was also instrumental in forming of the Puntland state, which was eventually established in 1998 in Garoowe.

He worked with UNESCO twice, in 1999 and 2005, for developing a quality curriculum that was strengthening of the Somali education.

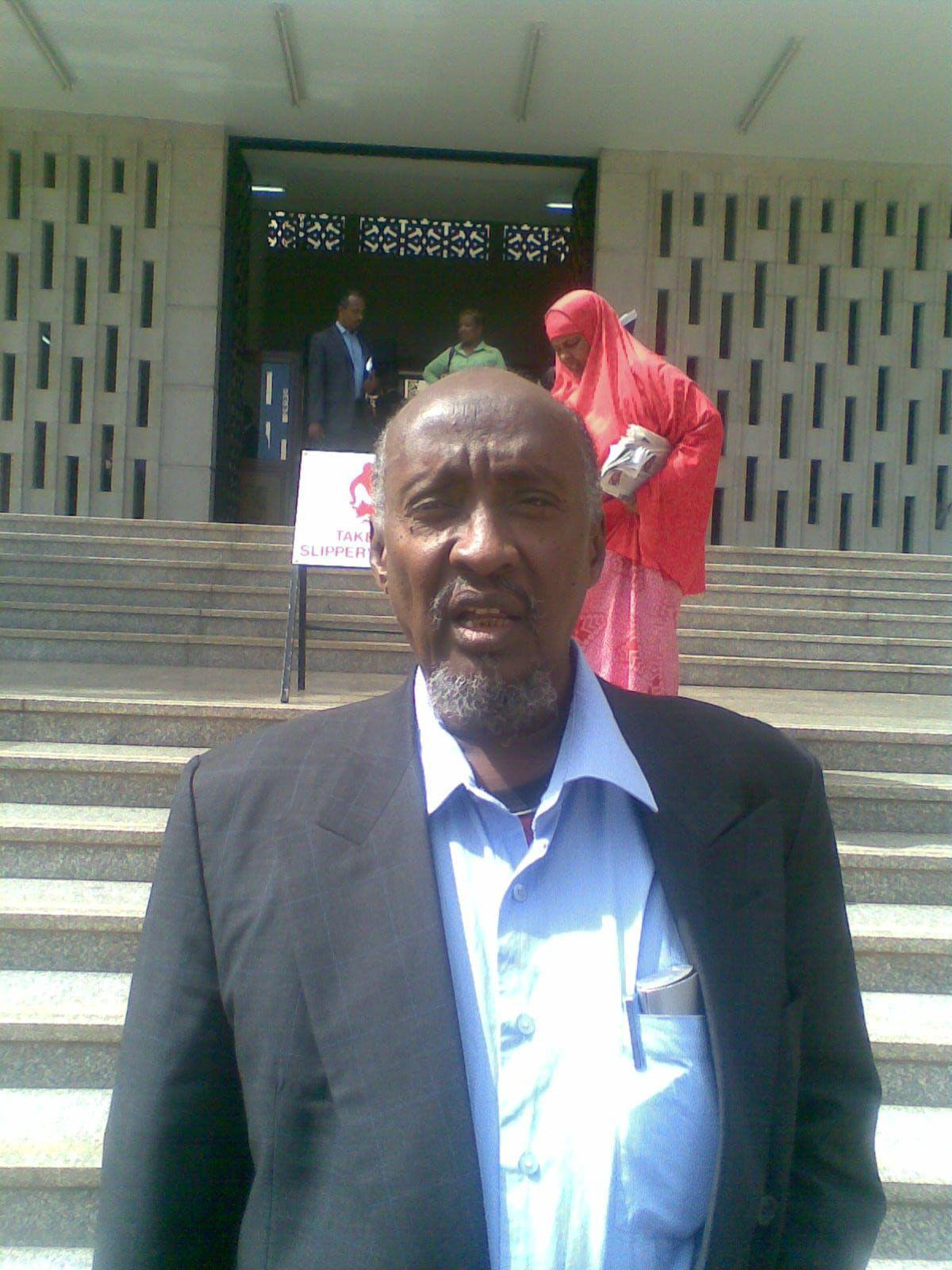
Hayaan representing Puntand ministry of security delegation in Kigali, Rwanda (2010)

Ali Hayan has lately served as the Director General of Puntland Interior Ministry from 2002 to 2005 during Abdullahi Yusuf's presidency since later was appointed by President Adde Muse as Director general Puntland Security Minister from 2005 to 2009 after the president Farole succeeded Adde, (Note: President Abdullahi Yusuf Ahmed (1998-2004), later acting President Mohamed Abdi Hashi (2004-2005), Adde Muse (2005-2009) Abdirahman Farole (2009-2014)) Hayan continued his term until his death 2013.

== Death ==
Ali Hayan who was 63 years old, died in Garoowe on July 10, 2013. He ended up leaving nine children and was known for his legacy of contributions to the Somali education sector.
