= Galgala campaign =

2014 military campaign in Somalia

Galgala Campaign
- Part of Somali Civil War, War in Somalia (2009-present)
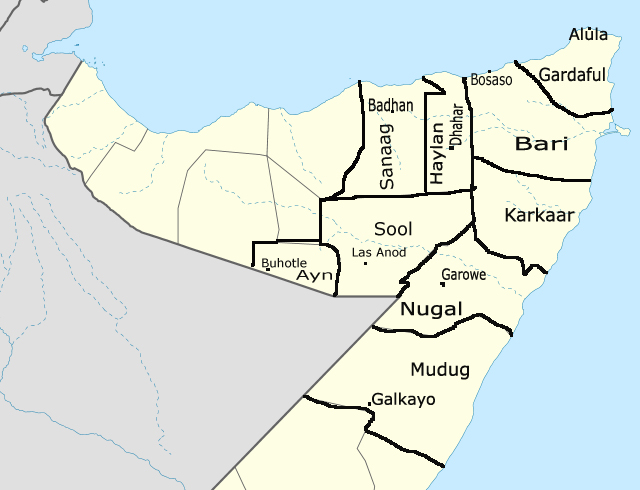
- Area under control of Puntland administration as of February 2008
Date	August 8 – October 1, 2014
Location	Galgala area, Puntland, Somalia
Result	Puntland victory Continuation of low level insurgency
Territorial changes	Galgala area recaptured by Puntland

Belligerents
Harakat al-Shabaab Mujahideen Warsangali clan militia	Puntland: Puntland Dervish Force; Puntland Intelligence Agency

Commanders and leaders
Mohamed Said Atom (surrendered)	(Puntland) Abdiweli Mohamed Ali (Puntland) Colonel Jama Said Warsame "Afguduud" (Puntland) Jimale Jama Takar (Puntland) General Said Dheere Mohamed

Strength
250	Hundreds of soldiers

Casualties and losses
: 96 killed	18 killed
- 100+ civilians killed 800 people displaced (July–August)

The Galgala campaign was a military campaign in the autonomous Puntland region of Somalia, that took place periodically from 8 August until 1 October 2014. It was aimed at regaining control of the Galgala hills, which had fallen in hands of al-Qaeda-linked al-Shabaab commander Sheikh Mohamed Said Atom and his militia.

== Background ==
Mohamed Said known as Atom has been involved in smuggling arms from Puntland to al-Shabaab fighters in Southern Somalia and has been implicated in incidents of piracy, kidnapping, and terrorism.

== Campaign ==
The campaign started on 8 August, in response to an al-Shabaab attack on 26 July which left 2 Puntland soldiers dead. In response to the crackdown, al-Shabaab launched several bombings, targeting civilian centers such as the city of Bosaso. The campaign ended when Puntland forces seized the villages of Dhagah Barur, Dhagahdheer, and Dindigle on 17 October. Dindigle was al-Shabaab's last stronghold in the region.

In 2010, 150 of Atom’s men were reported to have defected and joined the Puntland Intelligence Agency. Military sources reported that Atom "‘fled before the Galgala war started’ and left his comrades to face Puntland troops alone." It was believed that Atom had fled to Burao, Somaliland’s second largest city. Burao police chief Abdirahman Fohle conducted raids to look for al-Shabaab linked militants. He denied reports that Atom was hiding in the area, but affirmed that he would arrest "him or anyone else who is a threat to regional security."

On 17 March 2014, the commander of the Puntland Security Forces in Galgala Colonel Jama Said Warsame "Afguduud" was assassinated in the afternoon in a bomb attack at the outskirts of Bosaso. Afguduud together with three of his security guards were rushed to the nearest hospital, however he succumbed to the critical injuries sustained from the attack and died in the hospital. According to Al-Shabaab spokesman Sheikh Ali Dheere the attack was result of a long planned assault.

On 7 June 2014, the Ministry of Information announced that Atom had agreed to defect from Al-Shabaab. According to the Federal government ministry, Atom accused Ahmed Godane, the leader of Al-Shabaab of having a foreign agenda. "I would like to declare that as of today I have decided to resolve my religious and political issues through peaceful means and understanding," Atom said, according to the government.

On 1 October 2014, Puntland forces recaptured the last stronghold of Al-Shabaab in Galgala. According to Abdiweli Hirsi Abdille, the information minister of Puntland, troops had captured the Galgala region in an early morning offensive. The offensive lasted 2 hours, forcing insurgents to retreat.

== Aftermath ==
On 3 October 2014, the Puntland government released a statement accusing Al-Shabaab of having destroyed agricultural communities in Galgala and nearby settlements including historic farms resulting in Internally Displaced People.
