= Mohamed Said Atom =

Somali faction leader (born 1966)

Mohamed Said Atom محمد سعيد اتوم
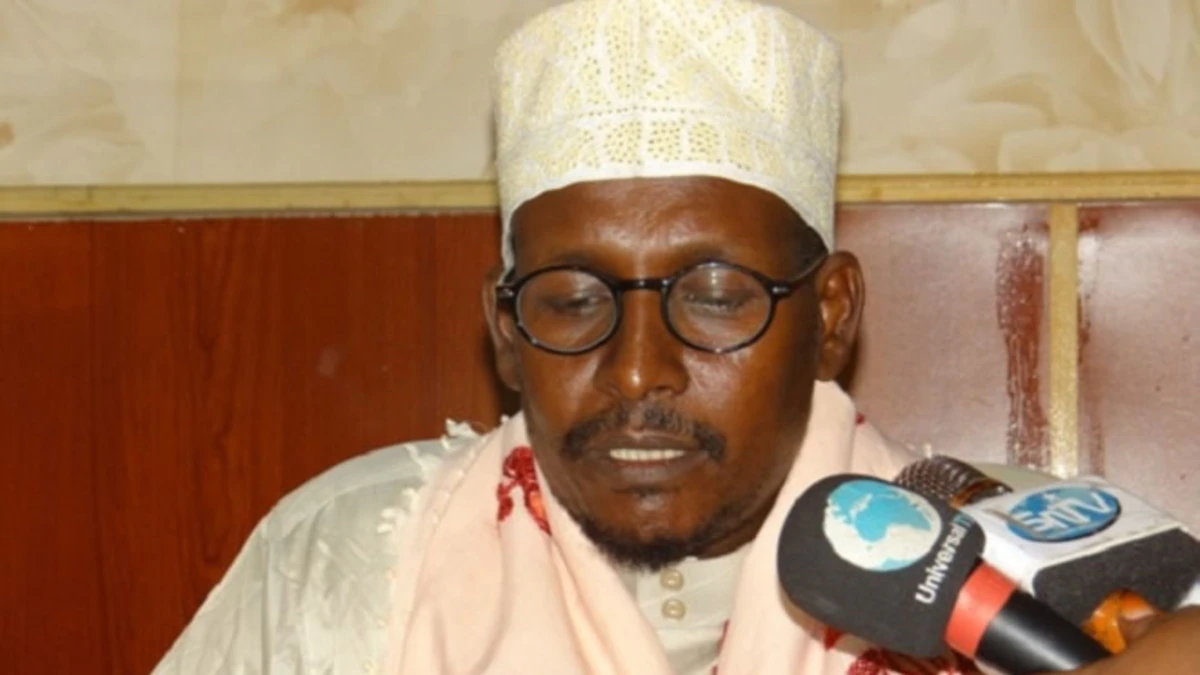
- Atom in 2016
- Born: 1966 (age 59–60); Galgala, Somalia
- Occupations: Islamist; faction leader; arms-smuggler; Jihadist
- Years active: 2009–2014
- Title: Amir
- Movement: Al-Shabaab militant

Sheikh Mohamed Said Atom (Somali: Sheekh Maxamed Siciid Atom, Arabic: محمد سعيد اتوم; born 1966) is a Somali arms-smuggler, faction leader and al-Shabaab commander. On 7 June 2014, Atom surrendered to the Somali government. He is from the Warsangali clan.

== Al-Shabaab operative ==
An arms-smuggler on both U.S. and U.N. security watch-lists, Atom has been tied to the Al-Qaeda-linked al-Shabaab group of Islamist militants that is waging war against Somalia's Transitional Federal Government. According to a 2008 United Nations Monitoring Group report, he is “aligned with al-Shabaab and may take instructions from Shabaab leader Fu’ad Muhammad Khalaf ‘Shangole.’”

== Galgala conflict ==
In 2010, Atom's militia was stationed in Galgala, Bari region of Puntland. That same year, he declared war on the autonomous state, announcing on July 28 that: "We are members of the Shabab, and the Shabab are members of us. We have good contacts. We are united in our objectives."

On August 8, 2010, Puntland Security Force launched an offensive against Atom's militants, who were hiding out in the Galgala hills. Atom had fled just before the attack that left more than 100 militants dead, having reportedly misled his men prior to the Puntland army's offensive by promising reinforcements from Al-Shabaab via the town of Burao in neighbouring Somaliland. By late October, Puntland military personnel had seized the last insurgent outposts.

On May 11, 2011, fighting flared up again in the Galgala hills, as militants loyal to Atom attempted to ambush Puntland soldiers in an early morning raid. Five Puntland troops were reportedly killed and four were wounded in the ensuing battle, while at least 21 of the Al-Shabaab-affiliated militiamen were slain. The remaining militants fled to their mountain hideouts, with Puntland army personnel conducting military operations in pursuit.

On December 30, 2011, Atom's military attacked Puntland soldiers based in the Laag Village around 30 km from Bosaso. The fighting left two Puntland soldiers dead.

== Somaliland tie allegations ==
In October 2010, Garowe Online reported that Atom was hiding out in Somaliland after being pursued by the neighboring Puntland region's authorities for his role in targeted assassination attempts against Puntland officials as well as bomb plots. Several of Atom's followers were also reportedly receiving medical attention in the country, after having been wounded in a counter-terrorism raid in the Galgala hills by Puntland security personnel. According to Puntland government documents, Somaliland's Riyale government in 2006 both financed and offered military assistance to Atom's men as part of a campaign to destabilize the autonomous territory via proxy agents and to distract attention away from the Somaliland government's own attempts at asserting control in the disputed Sool province. The Puntland Intelligence Agency (PIA) also alleged that over 70 salaried Somaliland soldiers had fought alongside Atom's militiamen during the Galgala operation, including one known Somaliland intelligence official who died in the ensuing battle. In January 2011, the Puntland government issued a press release accusing the incumbent Somaliland administration of providing a safe haven for Atom and of attempting to revive remnants of his militia. The Somaliland authorities, which had earlier described Atom as a "terrorist", strenuously denied all of the charges, dismissing them as "baseless" and intended to divert attention away from Puntland's attempt to establish what it described as a "large army". In January 2011, the Hargeisa-based broadsheet Haatuf also published an interview wherein a representative of Atom's denied that his group was affiliated with Al-Shabaab and requested military assistance from Somaliland. In May 2011 Puntland's governor of Sanaag region Mohamoud Said Nur claimed that Somaliland is behind the renewed fighting in Galgala.

== Defection ==
On 7 June 2014, the Ministry of Information announced that Atom had agreed to defect from Al-Shabaab. According to the Federal government ministry, Atom accused Ahmed Godane, the leader of Al-Shabaab of having a foreign agenda. "I would like to declare that as of today I have decided to resolve my religious and political issues through peaceful means and understanding," Atom said, according to the government.

The defection was welcomed by Puntland where Atom staged his insurgency. In reaction to Atom’s surrendering, the President of Puntland regional State Abdiweli Mohamed Ali Gaas said that Atom’s decision to defect was a great defeat for Al Shabab who now seems to be disassembling.

=== Qatar settlement ===
After defection Atom lived in Doha, Qatar. On November 24, 2017, Saudi Arabia, Egypt, Bahrain and United Arab Emirates released a list of 11 individuals including Atom designed for terrorism.
