= Ahmed Ibrahim Artan =

Somali diplomat

Ahmed Ibrahim Artan أحمد ابراهيم عرتن
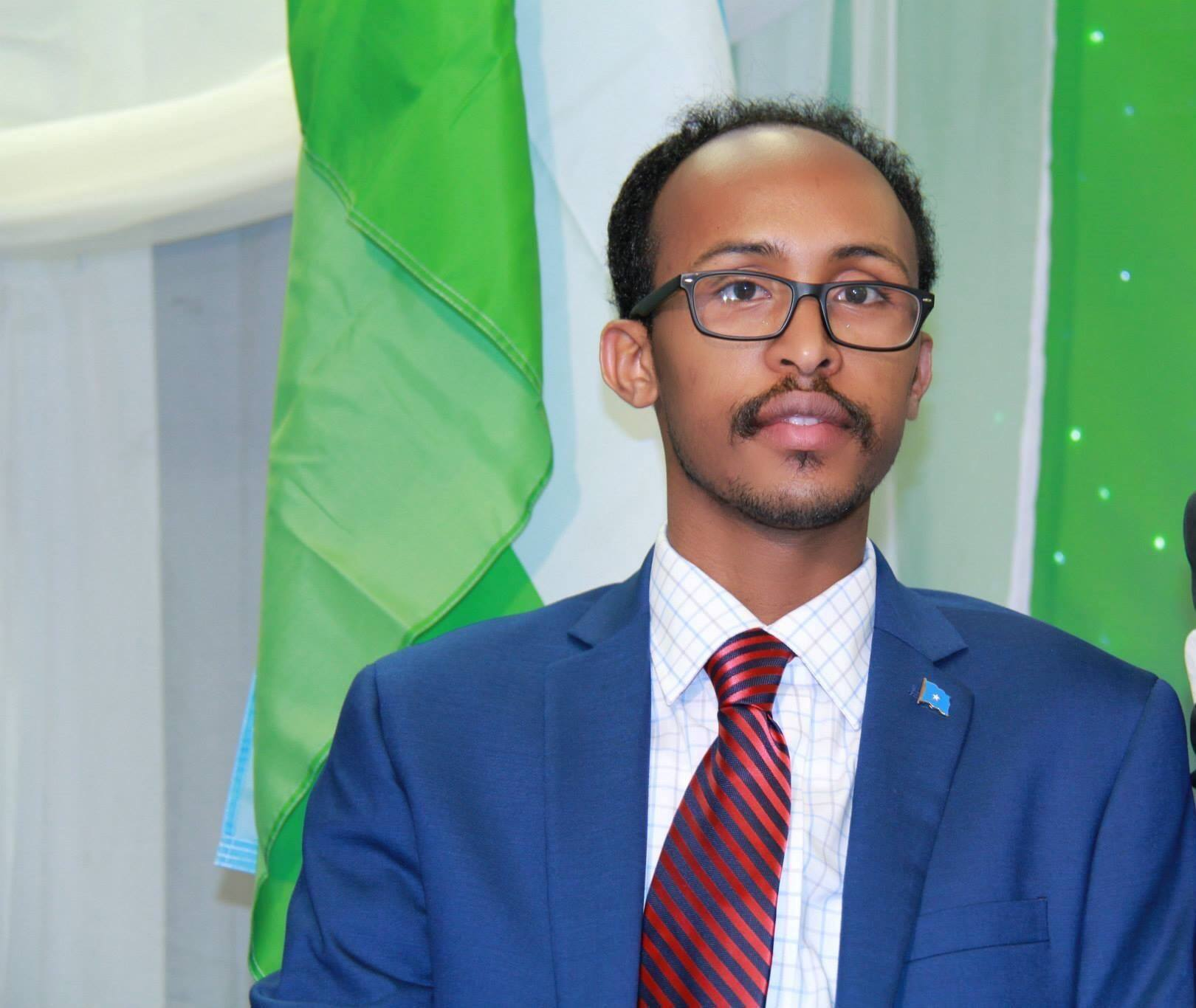

Personal details
- Born: Ahmed Ibraahim Artan Qandala, Somalia
- Party: Independent
- Parent: Ibrahim Artan Ismail (father)
- Education: Economist and politician
- Occupation: Minister of Security of Puntland.

Ahmed Ibrahim Artan Somali: Ahmed Ibrahim Cartan; Arabic: أحمد ابراهيم عرتن) is a Somali diplomat, author and currently Minister of Security of Puntland.. He is the former Labourers and Youth adviser to the Somali president.

== Personal life ==
Ahmed is originally from the autonomous Puntland region in northeastern Somalia. He was born in the coastal town of Kandala, situated in the northeastern Bari region of Somalia. Ahmed from upper-class life, his father was one of the Somali millionaires from 1960s to 1991.

His father Ibrahim Artan Ismail, nicknamed "Haaji Bakiin", served as minister of interior and security of Puntland.

=== Education ===
For his secondary education, Ahmed attended a local school in Bosaso, Somalia. Between 2000 and 2004, he completed a Bachelor's degree in Management accounting from the a local University at Bosaso, Somalia in Nairobi, Kenya. He followed that in 2009 with a Master's degree in project management from the Kenyatta University.

=== Career ===
In an administrative capacity, Ahmed worked at the adviser of the Somali president.
