= Omar Mohamoud =

Somali Sub Clan

Cumar Maxamuud Saleebaan

Regions with significant populations
- Nugal, Mudug, Doollo

Languages
- Af-Somali, Arabic,

Religion
- Islam

Related ethnic groups
- Osman Mahmoud, Isse Mohamoud, Majeerteen

The Omar Mahamoud (Somali: Cumar Maxamuud, Arabic: عمر محمود) is a Somali sub-clan, part of the Mohamoud Saleeban, itself a sub-clan of the Majeerteen sub-clan of the Harti conglomeration of Darod clans. The Omar Mohamoud is one of the largest Majeerteen sub-clans. The Omar Mohamoud clan primarily inhabit the Mudug and southern Nugaal regions of Puntland in northern Somalia. a large number of the clan settle in Doollo region of Ogadenia, as well as in the port city of Kismayo and the Lower Juba region of southern Somalia.

== Clan tree ==
"There is no clear agreement on the clan and sub-clan structures and some lineages might be omitted." However, the following summarized clan tree presented below is taken from John Hunt's A general survey of the Somaliland Protectorate (1944-1950):

*Mohamoud Saleban
  - Nuh Mohamoud
  - Xariir Mohamoud
  - Muse Mohamoud (Bah-leelkase)
  - Yahye Mohamoud (Bah-leelkase)
  - Osman Mohamud
  - Isse Mohamoud
  - Omar Mohamud
    - Nassar Omar
    - Ibrahim Omar
      - Sheikh Golle Ibrahim
      - Sheikh Hussein Ibrahim
      - Shiekh Abdillahi Ibrahim
      - Sheikh Harun Ibrahim
      - Abdi Ibrahim
      - Diriye Ibrahim
      - Ahmed Aw ibrahim (Sheikh Ahmed Gole)
        - Nur Sheikh (Bah- Mirifle)
        - Abdisamad Sheikh (Bah-Timiro)
        - Azhari Sheikh (Bah- Timiro)
        - Mursal Sheikh (Bah-Ceebla)
        - Abdishakur Sheikh (Bah-Ceebla)
        - Osman Sheikh (Bah-Ceebla)
        - Mohamud Sheikh (Bah-xasan)
        - Abdirahman Af-Guriye Sheikh (Bah-xasan)
      - Elmi Ibrahim
      - Fiqi Hirsi Elmi (Ugaar reer X.Gooni)
        - Omar Fiqi Hirsi (Qalaafe)
        - Siyad Fiqi Hirsi (Qalaafe)
        - Fiqi Hassan Hirsi (Bah-Ogaden)
          - Caalim Hassan
          - Fiqi Ibrahim Hassan
            - Mohamud Ibrahim
            - Hussein Ibrahim (Reer Gambarey)
            - Fiqi Mohamed Ibrahim
    - Ali Omar
      - Siyad Ali
      - Awlyahan Ali
    - Yonis Omar
      - Mohamed Yonis
        - bahale Mohamed
        - Reer Ciyaar
        - Hirsi Mohamaed
          - Camey Hirsi
            - Tiiri Camey
            - Farah Camey
          - Ahmed Hirsi
            - Jama Ahmed
              - Mohamed Ahmed
              - Mohamud Ahmed
      - Bi`idyahan Yonis
        - Fatax Bi`idyahan
          - Liban Fatax
          - Naleye Fatax
          - Shirdon Fatax
            - Warfa Shirdon
            - Diriye Shirdon
              - Mohamed Diriye
              - Hassan Diriye
        - Abdi Bi`idyahan
          - Warsame Abdi
          - Samatar Abdi
            - Abdille Samatar
              - Warsame Abdille
              - Qadad Abdille
          - Roble Abdi
            - Jama Roble
            - Jibril Roble
              - Nur Jibril
              - Muse Jibril
                - Diriye Muse
                - Hirsi Muse
    - Mohamed Omar
      - Warfa Mohamed
      - Abdalle Mohamed
      - Isse Mohamed
      - Hussein Mohamed
      - Isaq Mohamed
        - Gojax Ishaq
        - Gabayte Ishaq
      - Abdi Karim Mohamed
        - Osman Abdikarim
        - Sharmarke Abdikarim (Reer Bootaan)
      - Geddi Mohamed
        - Yusuf Geddi
        - Ali Geddi
        - Farah Geddi
      - Omar Mohamed
        - Hasan Omar
        - Ahmed Omar
        - Ishaq Omar
        - Mohamud (Xadayaal Cali) Omar
        - Abdikarim Omar
          - Salah Abdikarim
          - Jama Abdikarim
          - Mohamud Abdikarim
          - Ibrahim Abdikarim
        - Hussein Omar (Reer Hussein)
          - Farah Hassan
          - Shamarke Hassan
          - Mohamed (Maradoon) Hassan
        - Ali Geedi Omar (Reer Ali Geedi)
          - Osman Ali
          - Rooble Ali
          - Samatar Ali
          - Liban Ali
          - Farah Ali
          - Warsame Ali
          - Mahamood Ali
          - Farah Ali
          - Muse Ali
          - Koshin Ali
            - Shirwac Koshin
          - Shirwa Ali
            - Mohamed Shirwac
            - Farah Shirwac
            - Abdisalam (Amiir) Shirwac
            - Warsame Shirwac
            - Liban Shirwac
    - Isaq Omar
      - Isse Isaq
        - Abdi Isse (Cabdi Ciise)
          - Hirsi "Farabadne" Abdi (Bah-awrtable)
            - Liban Hirsi
            - Cigaal Hrsi
              - Mohamed Cigal
              - Jama Cigal
              - Koshin Cigal
                - Elmi Koshin
                - Warsame Koshin
                - Farah Koshin
                - Jama Koshin
                - Cigal Koshin
                  - Samatar Koshin
                  - Liban (Cariir) Koshin
                    - Kahiye Liban
                    - Ali Liban
                    - Wardheer Liban
                    - Diirato Liban
            - Mohamed Hirsi (Bah-gorod)
              - Samatar Moahmed
              - Ali (Guray) Mohamed
              - Liban Mohamed
              - Cigal Mohamed
                - Liban Cigal
                  - Hassan (Yare) Liban
                  - Shido Liban
                  - Mohamed (Timo yare) Liban
                    - Cumar Mohamed
                    - Warsame Mohamed
          - Mohamed Abdi (Bah-Ina Hirsi)
            - Fahiye Mohamed
            - Hildid Mohamed
              - Caraye Hildid
              - Sharmarke Hildid
                - Kooshin Sharmarke
                  - Adam Koshin
                - Cigal (Dhoore) Sharmarke
                  - Warsame Cigal
                  - Abdulle Cigal
                  - Ali (Gaas) Cigal
                  - Dhinkaal Cigal
                - Ali Sharmarke
                  - Gulled Ali (Reer Guuleed Cali)
                - Hirsi (Cade) Sharmarke
              - Shirdon Hildid
                - Naleye Shirdon
                - Hassan Shirdon
                - Farah Shirdon
                  - Warsame Farah
                    - Dabac Warsame
                    - Adam Warsame
                  - Mohamed Farah
                    - Samatar Moahmed
                      - Bah-Awrtable
                        - Reer Casal
                        - Reer Cageeye
                - Gulled Shirdon
                  - Samatar Gulled
                    - Ahmed Samatar
                    - Gesacade Samatar
                    - Shirwac Samatar
      - Abdulle Isaq
        - Omar Abdulle (Bah-Mareexaan)
        - Samakab Abdulle
        - Osman Abdulle
        - Ahmed Abdulle
          - Yusuf Ahmed
            - Abdi Yusuf
              - Ali Abdi
              - Ahmed Abdi
          - Fiqi Ahmed
            - Muse Fiqi
            - Hussein Fiqi
              - Adam Hussein
              - Hassan Hussein
              - Omar Hussein
              - Abdikarim Hussein
            - Yusuf Fiqi
              - Salah Yusuf
              - Ishaq Yusuf
                - Jama Ishaq
                - Adam Ishaq
                - Hashi Ishaq
              - Mohamed Yusuf
                - Abdi Mohamed
                - Ahmed Mohamed
                - Abdinasir Mohamed
                - Yasin MOhamed
        - Jibril Abdulle
          - Egal Jibril
            - Mohamed Egal (Bah Dhulbahante)
            - Abdi Egal
            - Liban Egal
            - Aden Egal (Reer Aadan)
              - Hirsi Aden
              - Gulled Aden
              - Cirobe Aden
              - Jamac Aden
              - Diini Aden
              - Magan Aden
              - Warsame Aden
              - Mohamud Aden
              - Dhawed Aden
              - Aman Aden
              - Ali Aden
                - Hayle Ali
                - Samatar Ali
                - Magan Ali
                - Yusuf Ali
                - Mohmaed Ali
                - Abdille Ali
                - Aden Ali
                  - Ahmed Aden
                  - Abdille Aden
                  - Yusuf Aden
                    - Bayle Yusuf
                      - Omar Bayle
                      - Warsame Bayle
                      - Jama Bayle
                        - Elmi Jama
                        - Mohamed Jama
                      - Jibril Bayle
                        - Mohamed Jibril
                        - Mohamud Jibril
                - Jama Ali
                  - Warsame Jama
                  - Nur Jama
                  - Abdille Jama
                  - Mahad Jama
                    - Abdulle Mahad
                    - Farah Mahad
                  - Aden Jama
                    - Hirsi Ade
                    - Jama Aden
                    - Nur Adenn
                  - Hirsi Jama
                    - Basse Hirsi
                      - Nur Basse
                      - Abdidulle Basse
                      - Hassan Base
            - Shirwa Egal
              - Sharmake Shirwa (Bah-Hawiye)
              - Mohamed Shirwa (Bah Abaskul)
              - Ali Shirwa ((Bah Abaskul)
              - Warfa Shirwa (Bah Ogaden)
              - Mohamud Shirwa (Bah Ogaden)
              - Hirsi Shirwa (Bah Marehan)
              - Mahad Shirwa (Bah Marehan)
              - Guled "Fagaase" Shirwa (Bah-Leelkase)
              - Farah Shirwa (Bah-Leelkase)
                - Yusuf Farah
                - Ali Farah
                - Mohamud Farah
                - Warsame Farah
                - Egal Farah
                - Dalal Farah
                - Darod Farah
                - Guled Farah
                - Irale Farah
                - Abdille Farah (Reer Cabdille)
                  - Mohamud Abdille
                  - Ali Abdille
                    - Galayr Ali (Reer Galayr)
                  - Jama Abdille
                    - Gulled 'Guraase' Jama
                    - Hassan Jama
                  - Ahmed Abdulle
                    - Hussein Ahmed
                    - Hassan Ahmed (Reer Aw Xasan)
                  - Mohamed Abdulle
                    - Magan Mohamed
                    - Kulmiye Mohamed
                    - Afdhub Mohamed
                    - Kure Mohamed (Reer kuure)
                    - Jama 'Calanle' Mohamed (Reer Calanle)
                    - Farah ' Dhowre' Mohamed (Reer Dhowre)
                - Mohamed Farah (Reer Maxamed Faarax)
                  - Muse Mohamed
                    - Gulled Muse
                    - Ali Muse
                    - Mohamed Muse
                    - Hirsi Muse
                  - Ali Mohamed
                    - Cirobe Ali (Bah-Dir)
                    - Abdulle Ali (Bah-Dir)
                    - Mohamed Ali (Bah-Dir)
                    - Samatar Ali (Bah-Dir)
                    - Magan Ali (Bah-Ogaadeen)
                    - Omar Ali (Bah-Ogaadeen)
                    - Warfaa Ali (Bah-Ogaadeen)
                    - Elmi Ali (Bah-Ogaadeen)
                    - Liban Ali (Bah-Waceys)
                    - Farah Ali (Bah-Waceys)
                    - Wa'eys Ali (Bah-Waceys)
                    - Jama Ali (Bah-Waceys)
                      - Mohamed Jama
                      - Warfa Jama
                      - Samatar Jama
                      - Nur Jama
                - Hersi Farah (Reer Xirsi)
                  - Liban Hirsi (Bah-Leelkase)
                    - Mohamed Liban
                    - Diriye Liban
                  - Hassan Hirsi (Bah-Leelkase)
                    - Warfaa Hassan
                    - Mohamed hassan
                  - Cigal Hirsi (Bah-Caduur)
                  - Mohamud Hirsi (Bah-Iimaan)
                  - Ahmed Hirsi (Bah-Iimaan)
                    - Farah Ahmed
                      - Abdirahman Farah
                      - Hirsi Farah
                    - Elmi Ahmed
                      - Samatar 'Baadi' Elmi
                      - Mohamud Elmi
                    - Dirye 'Baradho' Ahmed
                      - Ahmed Diriye
                      - Mohamed Diriye
                    - Isse 'Ibcad' Ahmed
                      - Abdulle Isse
                      - Ali Isse
                    - Magan Ahmed
                      - Ali Magan
                      - Abdulle Magan
                      - Mohamud Magan
                    - Nur Ahmed
                      - Yusuf 'Guray' Nur
                      - Ishaq Nur
                      - Muse Nur
                      - Farah 'Gool nuug' Nur
                      - Botan Nur
                        - Jama 'Gaas' Botan
                        - Farah Botan
                      - Hassan Nur
                        - Mohamud Nur
                        - Mohamed Nur
                        - Farah Nur
                      - Ahmed Nur
                        - Farah Ahmed
                        - Omar Ahmed
                        - Nur Ahmed
                        - Ali Ahmed
                        - Hassan Ahmed
                  - Nur Hirsi (Bah- Sakhaawe)
                  - Yusuf Hirsi (Bah- Sakhaawe)
                    - Hildid Yusuf
                    - Cigal Yusuf
                  - Elmi Hirsi (Bah- Sakhaawe)
                    - Mohamed Elmi
                    - Yusuf Elmi
                    - Hassan Elmi
                  - Aden Hirsi (Bah- Sakhaawe)
                    - Ishaq Aden
                    - Muse Aden
                      - Aden Muse
                      - Faran Muse
                      - Abdulle muse
                    - Shirwa Aden
                      - Mohamed 'Tegey' Shirwa
                      - Muse Shirwa
                      - Ali Shirwa
                      - Aden Shirwa
                    - Cigal Aden
                      - Catosh Cigal
                      - Dayr Cigal
                      - Samaan Cigal
                      - Dhaaday Cigal
                    - Jama Aden
                      - Sulux Jama
                      - Jindhe Jama
                      - Elmi Jama
                        - Abdulle Elmi
                        - Hirsi Elmi
                      - Warsame Jama
                        - Shire Warsame
                        - Diriye Warsame
                        - Nur Warsame
                        - Sagil Warsame
                        - Dhore Warsame
                        - Botan Warsame
                        - Degel Warsame
                        - Gelle Warsame
                        - Isse Warsame
                        - Libaxe Warsame
                - Khalaf Farah (Reer Khalaf)
                  - Yusuf Khalaf (Bah-Mareexaan)
                  - Nur Khalaf (Bah-Mareexaan)
                    - Mohamed Nure
                    - Ahmed Nure
                    - Farah Nure
                    - Yusuf Nure
                    - Cade Nure
                  - Ali 'Madoobe' Khalaf (Bah-Mareexaan)
                  - Liban Khalaf (Bah-Mareexaan)
                    - Ali Liban
                    - Botam Liban
                  - Warsame Khalaf (Bah-Carbeed)
                  - Daad Khalaf (Bah-Carbeed)
                    - Dalal Daad
                    - Caloon Daad
                    - Ali Daad
                    - Farah 'Jiin' Daad
                    - Hassan Daad
                    - Elmi Daad
                    - Yusuf Daad
                    - Samatar Daad
                    - Biixi Daad
                  - Mohamed Khalaf (Bah-Ogaadeen)
                    - Fanaye Mohamed
                    - Warsame Mohamed
                    - Caato Moahmed
                    - Kooshin Moahmed
                  - Farah Khalaf (Bah-Ogaadeen)
                    - Nur 'Sagaar' Farah
                    - Warsame farah
                    - Mahamed 'Gaani' Farah
                      - Gelle Mohamed
                      - Sofe Mohamed
                      - Ali 'Barre' Mohamed
                      - Nur Mohamed
                      - Hassan Mohamed
                      - Khalil Mohamed
                      - Warsame Mohamed
                      - Hussein Mohamed
                      - Ahmed Mohamed
                  - Cigal Khalaf (Bah-Dhulbahante)
                    - Elmi Cigal
                    - Farah Cigal
                    - Nur Cigal
                      - Fanagse Nur
                      - Jama Nur
                    - Mohamud Cigal
                      - Ali Mohamud
                      - Warsame Mohamud
                  - Jama Khalaf (Bah-Dhulbahante)
                    - Mohamed Jama
                      - Qureex Mohamed
                        - Hirsi Qureex
                        - Carabduur Qureex
                      - Afey Mohamed
                        - Warsame Afey
                        - Barre Afey
                      - Farah Mohamed
                        - Dhool Farah
                        - Moahmed Farah
                      - Hirsi 'Dhaglaawe' Mohamed
                        - Serar Hirsi
                        - Abshir Hirsi
                        - Omar Hirsi
                        - Xadey Hirsi
                        - Aw nur Hirsi
                        - Sugulle Hirsi
                        - Aw Mohamed Hirsi
                        - Hashi Hirsi
                        - Aden Hirsi
                        - Elmi Hirsi
                  - Samater Khalaf (Bah-Dhulbahante)
                    - Abar Smamater
                    - Magan Samatar
                      - Gure Magan
                      - Mohamed Magan
                    - Farah Samatar
                      - Ali 'Dhere' Farah
                      - Hirsi Farah
                      - Hassan 'Yare' Farah
                      - Khalil 'Gurey' Farah
                    - Abdulle Samatar
                      - Warsame Abdille
                      - Nur 'Yare' Abdille
                      - Ahmed Abdille
                      - Mohamed Abdille
                    - Cigal 'Dayr' Samatar
                      - Yusuf Cigal
                      - Dhiidi Cigal
                      - Hirsi Cigal
                      - Hassan 'Maax' Cigal
                      - Aden Cigal
                      - Mohamed Cigal
                      - Abdille Cigal
                    - Hassan Samatar
                      - Ali 'Dhafar' Hassan
                      - Anshur Hassan
                      - Seed Hassan
                      - Yusuf Hassan
                      - Mohamud Hassan
                      - Isse Hassan
                      - Ahmed Hassan
                      - Hussein Hassan
                      - Xarer Hassan
                      - Dhore Hassan
                        - Shacur Dhore
                        - Gabose Dhore
                        - Omar Dhore
                        - Dige Dhore
                        - Jama Dhore
                        - Hussein Dhore
                        - Ali Ddhore
                        - Xanbul Dhore
                        - Abshire Dhore
                        - Warsame Dhore
                        - Caydid Dhore
                - Mahad Farah (Reer Mahad)
                  - Jama Mahad (Bih ina Cali)
                  - Hassan Mahad (Bih ina Cali)
                  - Warfa Mahad (Bih ina Cali)
                  - Warsame Mahad (Bih ina Cali)
                  - Ibrahim Mahad (Bih ina Geedi)
                  - Gulled Mahad (Bih ina Geedi)
                  - Mohamud Mahad (Bih ina Geedi)
                  - Magan Mahad (Bih ina Guuleed)
                  - Aden Mahad (Bih ina Guuleed)
                  - Koshin Mahad (Bih ina Guuleed)
                  - Nur Mahad (Bih ina Guuleed)
                  - Mohamed Mahad (Bih ina Guuleed)
                    - Abdullahi Mohamed (Bah-Dir)
                    - Cigal Mohamed (Bah-Dir)
                      - Sugulle Cigal
                        - Jama Sugulle
                        - Mohamued Sugulle
                    - Hassan Mohamed (Bah-Dir)
                      - Yusuf Hassan (Reer Qurux)
                      - Gaas Hassan
                        - Abdi Gaas
                        - Ali Gaas
                          - Hassan Ali
                          - Muse Ali
                          - Hirsi Ali
                    - Omar Mohamed
                      - Aden Omar
                      - Yusuf (Caris) Omar
                      - Hassan Omar
                        - Ahmed (Yey) Hassan
                        - Samatar Hassan
                    - Farah Mohamed
                      - Mohamud Farah (Reer Islaan)
                        - Mohamed Mohamud
                        - Yusuf Mohamud
                        - Jama Mohamud
                        - Elmi Mohamud
                        - Aden Mohamud
                          - Farah Aden
                          - Mohamed Aden
                          - Osman Aden
                          - Isse Aden
                          - Warsame Aden
                          - Hassan Aden
                          - Muse Aden
                          - Hirsi Aden
                          - Yusuf Aden
                          - Xiin Aden
                          - Mohamed Aden
                          - Omar Aden
                          - Jama Aden
                          - Nur Aden
                      - Jama (Dhacarato) Farah
                        - Hirsi Jama
                        - Elmi Jama
                        - Ahmed Jama
                        - Ali Jama
                        - Hassan Jama
                          - Farah Hassan
                          - Elmi Hassan
                          - Omar Hassan
                          - Gulled Hassan
                          - Cigal Hassan
                            - Ali Cigal
                            - Mohamud Cigal
                            - Mohamed Cigal
                          - Shirwa Cigal
                            - Yusuf Shirwa
                            - Botan Shirwa
                            - Mohmed Shirwa
                  - Aden Mahad (Bih ina Guuleed)
                    - Mohamud Aden (Bah-Sharmarke)
                      - Farah Mohamud
                      - Jama Mohamud
                      - Guure Mohamud
                      - Warsame Mohamud
                    - Gulled Aden (Bah-Sharmarke)
                      - Ahmed Gulled
                      - Warsame Gulled
                        - Ali Warsame
                        - Gaaban Warsame
                        - Ducale Warsame
                      - Farah Warsame
                        - Abdi Farah
                        - Mohamde (Af-Kalahaye) Farah
                        - Muse (Baydhabo) Farah
                        - Dulcad Farah
                        - Cali (Bahal) Farah
                        - Ahmed (Seed) Faraj
                        - Hirsi farah
                    - Omar Aden (Bah-Nuur)
                      - Jama Omar
                      - Hirsi Omar (Dhurwaa)
                    - Ali Aden (Bah-Nuur)
                      - Jama (Af-Cade) Ali
                      - Jibril Ali (Bah-Kidin)
                      - Mohamud Ali (Bah-Kidin)
                      - Elmi Ali (Bah-Kidin)
                      - Hassan Ali (Bah-Kidin)
                      - Mohamed (Af-Lahaar) Ali (Bah-Gutaale)
                      - Ibrahim Ali (Bah-Gutaale)
                      - Hirsi Ali (Bah-Gutaale)
                      - Muse Ali (Bah-Duud)
                      - Farah Ali (Bah-Duud)
                      - Abdalle Ali (Bah-Duud)
                    - Farah Aden (Bah-Nuur)
                      - Jama Farah
                      - Mohamed Farah
                      - Gulled Farah
                      - Gure farah
                      - Ahmed Farah
                      - Aden Farah
                    - Hirsi Aden (Bah-Nuur)
                      - Hassan Hirsi
                      - Hussein Hirsi
                      - Ahmed Hirsi
                      - Warsame Hirsi
                      - Budgug Hirsi
                      - Ali Hirsi
                      - Osman Hirsi
                      - Yacqub Hirsi
                    - Hassan Aden (Bah-Nuur)
                      - Mohamud Hassan (Bah-Shiikhaal)
                      - Warsame Hassan (Bah-Shiikhaal)
                      - Cigal Hassan (Bah-habar Xaawo)
                      - Samatar Hassan (Bah-habar Xaawo)
                      - Gulled (Cade) Hassan (Bah-Habar Faarax)
                      - Jama (Shanshagaab) Hassan (Bah-Habar Faarax)
                      - Abdi Hassan (Bah-Habar Faarax)
                    - Jama Aden (Bah-Sharmarke)
                      - Alli Jama
                      - Yusuf Jama
                      - Farah Jama
                      - Warsame Jama
                      - Ahmed Jama
                        - Farah Ahmed
                        - Cawl Ahmed
                          - Abdi Cawl
                          - Jama Cawl
                          - Botan Cawl
                          - Nur Cawl
                          - Farah cawl
                          - Hirsi Cawl (Bah-Dir)
                          - Mohamud Cawl (Bah-Dir)
                    - Abdi Aden (Bah-Sharmarke)
                      - Diini Abdi
                      - Yusuf Abdi
                      - Jama Abdi
                      - Ali Abdi
                      - Warsame Abdi
                      - Hirsi Abdi
                        - Isse Hirsi
                        - Karshe Hirsi
                      - Mohamed Abdi
                        - Jama Mohamed
                        - Warsame Mohamed
                        - Elmi Mohamed
                        - Ali (Jirde) Mohamed
                        - Yusuf (Gaban) Mohmed
                        - Magan Mohmed
                      - Farah (Guray) Abdi
                        - Hirsi Farah
                        - Warsame Farah
                        - Samatar Farah
                        - Hassan Farah
                          - Mohamed Hassan
                          - Farah Hassan
                          - Elmi Hassan
                          - Nur Hassan
                    - Warsame Aden (Bah-Sharmarke)
                      - Hassan Warsame (Bah-Samaley)
                      - Shucle Warsame (Bah-Samaley)
                      - Hussein Warsame (Bah-Samaley)
                      - Diriye Warsame (Bah-Samaley)
                      - Dhiidi Warsame (Bah-Indha caw)
                      - Gulled Warsame (Bah-Indha caw)
                        - Warsame Gulled (Seed)
                        - Ahmed Gulled
                        - Farah Gulled
                      - Xiirey Warsame (Bah-Samaley)
                      - Mohamed Warsame (Bihni Samatar Cade)
                      - Hirsi Warsame (Bihni Samatar Cade)
                      - Samatar Warsame (Bihni Samatar Cade)
                        - Farah Samatar (Bah-Dir)
                        - Axmed 'Timey' Samatar (Bah-Dir)
                        - Ali 'Guray' Samatar (Bah-Dir)
                        - Hassan 'Cade' Samatar (Bah-Dir)
                        - Dhure Samatar (Bah-Dir)
                        - Qaje Samatar (Bah-Dir)
                        - Botan Samatar (Bah-Cigal)
                        - Abdi Samatar (Bah-Cigal)
                        - Hosh Samatar (Bah-Cigal)
                      - Mohamud Warsame (Bah-Xulbado)
                        - Mohamed Mohamud
                          - Ali 'Tolow' Mohamed
                          - Hashi Mohamed
                        - Jama Mohamud
                          - Abdillahi Jama
                          - Shire Jama
                          - Bashir Jama
                      - Ali Warsame (Bah-Xulbado)
                        - Mohamed Ali
                        - Omar (Firin) Ali
                          - Hassan Omar
                          - Nur Omar
                          - Abdi Omar
                          - Mohamud Omar
                        - Ahmed (Timo Yare) Ali
                          - Ali Ahmed (Cali Mahad)
                          - Farah Ahmed
                          - Hassan Ahmed
                          - Dalmar Ahmed
                      - Jama Warsame (Bah-Xulbado)
                        - Ali 'Sanbuur' Jama (Bih ina-Nuur)
                        - Hassan Jama (Bih ina-Nuur)
                        - Nur Jama (Bih ina-Nuur)
                        - Mohamud Jama (Bih ina-Nuur)
                        - Mohamed Jama (Bih ina-Nuur)
                        - Yusuf 'Takar' Jama
                        - Elmi 'Qaate' Jama
                        - Adan Jama
                        - Samatar Jama
                        - Isse Jama (Bih ina-Sharmarke)
                        - Omar Jama (Bih ina-Sharmarke)
                        - Abdalle Jama (Bih ina-Sharmarke)
                        - Muse Jama (Bih ina-Sharmarke)
                        - Ismail 'Xanaf' Jama (Bih ina-Sharmarke)
                          - Mohamed Xanaf
                          - Gure Xanaf
                          - Ahned Xanaf
                          - Bixi Xanaf
                          - Hashi Xanaf
