= Osman Mohamoud (clan) =

Somali sub-clan

Osman Mahmoud عثمان محمود
- Darod Somali Clan
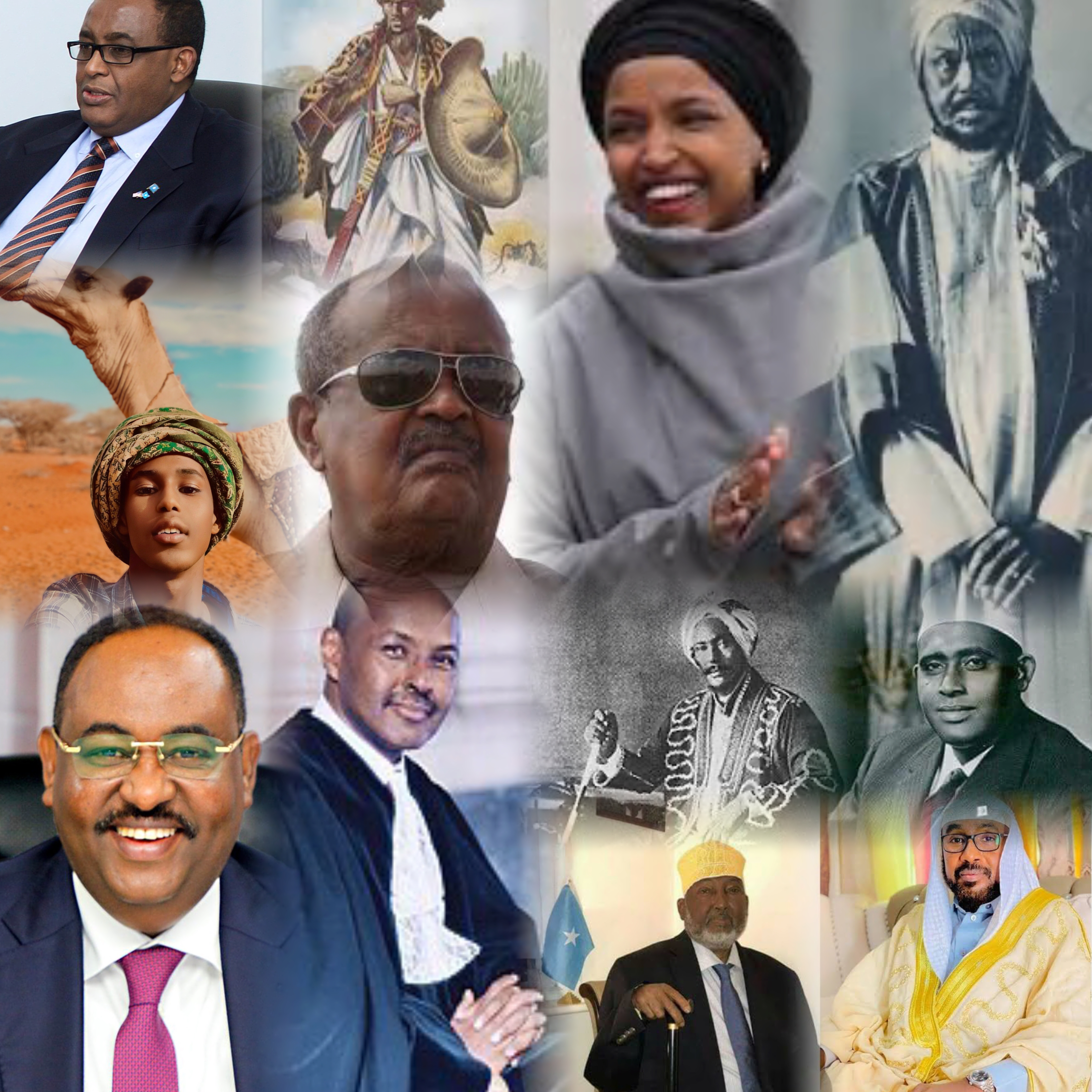
- Key figures of the Osman Mahmoud clan, from royalty to modern leaders and influencers
- Ethnicity: (Somalia) Somali
- Location: (Somalia) Somalia (Ethiopia) Ethiopia; Yemen; Oman (United Arab Emirates) UAE
- Descended from: Abdirahman bin Isma'il al-Jabarti
- Parent tribe: Majeerteen
- Branches: Idris Osman (Bah-Gareen); Hussein Osman (Bah-Gareen); Yusuf Osman
- Language: (Somalia) Somali (Arab League) Arabic
- Religion: Sunni Islam

The Osman Mahmoud (Somali: Cismaan Maxamuud; Arabic: عثمان محمود) is a Somali sub-clan of the Majeerteen clan. It forms part of the Harti branch of the main Darod clan. The sub-clan has a documented historical presence in the Horn of Africa and is associated with the Majeerteen Sultanate and the Sultanate of Hobyo.

== Overview ==
The Boqor (kingdom Family), or clan-head of the larger Mohamud Saleeban branch of the Osman Mahmoud, has traditionally served as a nominal leadership line within the broader Darod clan. The Osman Mahmoud are historically associated with the Majeerteen Sultanate, which was based in Baargaal and was a prominent political entity in Somalia during its peak from the mid 19th to the early 20th century. Boqor Osman Mahamuud, the ruler of the Majeerteen Sultanate, was one of the three most prominent Somali leaders at the turn of the 20th century.

The Osman Mahmoud sub-clan is also linked to the Sultanate of Hobyo, ruled by Yusuf Ali Kenadid, whose territory covered much of what is now the Mudug region. His son, Osman Yuusuf Keenadiid, is noted for inventing the Osmanya script, a writing system developed for the Somali language.

== Demographics ==
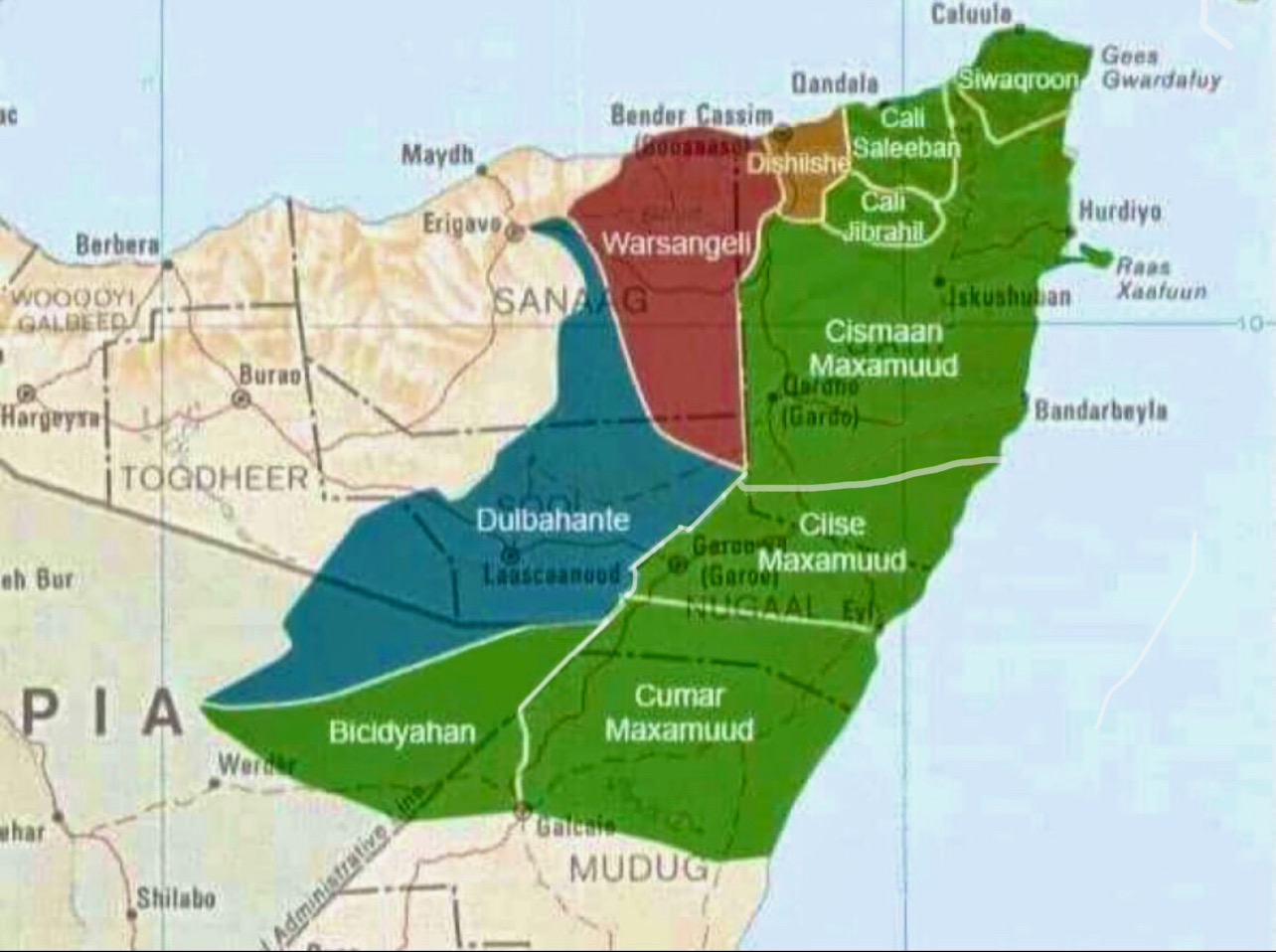
A broad clan map of Puntland depicting where the largest sub-clans settle. Cismaan Maxamud, being one of the largest, cover the majority of Bari and Karkaar regions

=== Territory ===
The Osman Mahmoud sub-clan lives today primarily in the Bari and Karkaar regions, making up the majority across the two regions. With Bari being the largest region in all of Somalia, the sub-clan covers a lot of ground. The Osman Mahmoud people can also be found living in the Mudug and Nugaal regions in Puntland as well. Bosaso and Qardho are two cities that are heavily populated by Osman Mahamud.

Bosaso was first settled and ruled by the Dishiishe clan, kin of the Majeerteen, in the 14th century. After disputes between the Dishiishe clan and Bah-Gareen (a sub clan of Osman Mahamud), the Osman Mahamud overthrew the leader and started to settle in the coastal city.

Qardho, one of the most ancient and history-rich cities in Somalia, is the head city for Osman Mahamuds, as they make an overwhelming majority in the Karkaar capital. In the early modern period, Qardho was a part of the Majeerteen Sultanate (Migiurtinia), centered in Aluula. It was later incorporated into Italian Somaliland during the early 20th century.

A large population of the clan can also be found settled in Oman, Yemen, and other Khaleeji countries.

=== Distribution and Xarig System ===
District	Members
Xariga Qardho	Aamir Mohamed, Bah-diroble, Bah-Isxul, Bah-yacquub; Elmi Mohamed, Samatar Omar, Muse Mohamed
Xariga Beyla	Ismail Mohamed, Muse Suldan; Yusuf Omar, Ismail Suldan, Guled Omar
Xariga Iskushuban-Bari	Bah-Dir Roble, Bah-Leelkase; Dalal Suldan, Yusuf Suldan
++Kismayo	Ismail Mohamed, Muse Suldan, Bah-Gareen; Bah-Yacqub, Bah-Gareen

== Sultanates and dynasties ==
King Cismaan Maxamuud, early 20th century

No.MJ	No.D	Name	Start	End
1	--	Sultan Ali Omar Mahamed		
2	20	Boqor Mahamed Sultan Ali Omar		
3	21	Boqor Yusuf Sultan Ali Omar		
4	22	Boqor Mahamud Boqor Mahamed Sultan Ali		
5	23	Boqor Mahamed Boqor Mahamud Boqor Mahamed		
6	24	Boqor Ali "Ambarre" Boqor Mahamed Boqor Mahamud		
7	25	Boqor Yusuf Boqor Ali Boqor Mahamed		
8	26	Boqor Mahamud "Hawadane" Boqor Yusuf Boqor Ali		1815
9	27	Boqor Osman (I) "Bah-Dir" Boqor Mahamud Boqor Yusuf	1815	1842
10	28	Boqor Yusuf "Bah-Yaqub" Boqor Mahamud Boqor Yusuf	1842	1844
11	29	Boqor Mahamud Boqor Osman Boqor Mahamud	1844	1860
12	30	Boqor Osman (II) Boqor Mahamud Boqor Osman	1860	1927
13	31	Boqor Muse Yusuf Boqor Osman	1927	1987
14	32	Boqor Mahamud Boqor Muse Yusuf	1987	2006
15	33	Boqor Abdulahi "King-Kong" Boqor Muse Yusuf	2006	2013
16	34	Boqor Burhaan Boqor Muse Yusuf	2013	Incumbent

=== Majeerteen Sultanate ===
The Majeerteen Sultanate, also known as Majeerteenia or Migiurtinia, was a Somali kingdom centered in the Horn of Africa. It was ruled by Boqor Osman Mahamuud (II) during its golden age. The earliest mention of the kingdom is in the 16th century.

Before the Majeerteen Sultanate, there was the Sultanate of Amaanle (Abdirahman Awe), which was overthrown and overtaken by Osman Mahamuud (I), who became the subsequent King and Sultan. It rose to prominence in the 19th century, under the reign of the resourceful Boqor (King) Osman Mahamuud (II). His Sultanate controlled Bari Karkaar, Nugaaal, and central Somalia in the 19th and early 20th centuries.

The polity exerted a strong centralised authority during its existence and possessed all of the organs and trappings of an integrated modern state: a functioning bureaucracy, a hereditary nobility, titled aristocrats, a state flag as well as a professional army. It was another example of the determination of the Migiurtini people to maintain a traditional and free society. The sultanate also maintained written records of their activities, which still exist. It also entered into treaties with foreign powers and exerted strong centralized authority on the domestic front.

=== Sultanate of Hobyo ===
The Sultanate of Hobyo, also known as the Sultanate of Obbia, was a 19th-century Somali kingdom in present-day northeastern and central Somalia and eastern Ethiopia. It was established in the 1870s by Ali Yusuf Kenadid. Initially, Ali Yusuf Kenadid's goal was to seize control of the neighbouring Majeerteen Sultanate, which was then ruled by his cousin Boqor Osman Mahamud. However, he was unsuccessful, and was eventually forced into exile in Yemen. A decade later, in the 1870s, Kenadid returned from the Arabian Peninsula with a band of Hadhrami musketeers and a group of devoted lieutenants. With their assistance, he managed to overpower the local Habar Gidir clans and establish the kingdom of Hobyo in 1878.

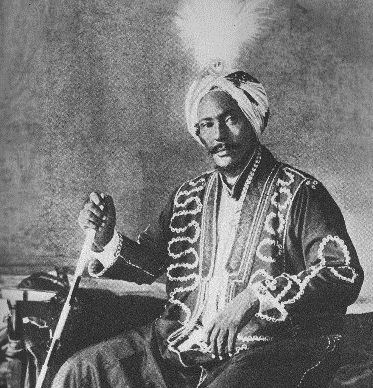
Sultan Ali Yusuf Kenadid

In the late 19th century, all extant Somali monarchs entered into treaties with one of the colonial powers, Abyssinia, Britain or Italy. In late 1888, Sultan Kenadid entered into a treaty with the Italians, making his realm an Italian protectorate. His rival Boqor Osman would sign a similar agreement vis-a-vis his own Sultanate the following year. Both rulers had signed the protectorate treaties to advance their own expansionist objectives, with Kenadid looking to use Italy's support in his dispute with the Omani Sultan of Zanzibar over an area bordering Warsheikh, in addition to his ongoing power struggle over the Majeerteen Sultanate with Boqor Osman. In signing the agreements, the rulers also hoped to exploit the rival objectives of the European imperial powers so as to more effectively assure the continued independence of their territories.

=== Colonial struggles ===
Hersi Boqor was the son of Boqor Osman Mahamuud and the heir apparent to the Sultanate of Migiurtinia. When the Italians announced their intentions to occupy Migiurtinia, Hersi Boqor united the sultanate's forces to rebel against the colonials. Under his leadership, the forces were able to slow the Italian advance, which was additionally hurt by a rebellion in the hinterlands of Hobyo that required military attention. For three years, the sultanate was in revolt and a number of fierce battles ensued.

== Somali Republic ==
Flag of the SYL

=== Somali Youth League ===
Osman Mahamud have had a lot of involvement with the progression of Somalia. This can be dated back to pre-independence and the formation of the Somali Youth League (SYL).

SYL was the first political party in Somalia. It played the biggest role in the nation's road to independence during the 1940s, 1950s and 1960s. During the Second World War, Britain occupied Italian Somaliland and militarily administered the territory from 1941 to 1950. Faced with growing Italian political pressure inimical to continued British tenure and Somali aspirations for independence, the Somalis and the British came to see each other as allies. The first modern Somali political party, the Somali Youth Club (SYC), was subsequently established in Mogadishu in 1943. It later became the Somali Youth League.

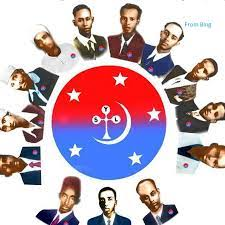
13 original founders of the SYL

Yasin Haji Osman Sharmarke, an Osman Mahamud man, founded the party in 1943. At its foundation, the party had thirteen founding members that consisted of all the major clans in Somalia, 4 Darood, 3 Hawiye, 3 Rahanweyn, and 2 Benadiri. All 4 of the Daarod members were Osman Mahamud including Yasin's younger brother, Dahir Haji Osman Sharmarke "Dhagawayne".

As time went on and the party grew in numbers, so did the amount of Osman Mahamuud members. The first two women to join this party, Timiro Ukaash and Maryan Haji Osman, sister of Yasin and Dahir, played a vital role in group and were a great beacon of representation for young women in the country. In fact, Maryan went on to be the first woman to open an Islamic School in Mogadishu that is still operating to this day. Well known political figures such as Abdirashid Ali Sharmarke and Haji Bashir Ismail Yusuf also first joined SYL.

=== Executives ===
The sub-clan has made for 2 Prime Ministers and 1 Federal President. Abdirashid Ali Sharmarke was Prime Minister of Somali Republic from July 12, 1960, to June 14, 1964, and President of Somali Republic from July 6, 1967, until his assassination on October 15, 1969.

He was also the father of Somali Prime Minister Omar Abdirashid Ali Sharmarke, who was the Prime Minister of Somalia from 2009 to 2010. He subsequently briefly served as Somalia's Ambassador to the United States in 2014. Sharmarke was re-appointed Prime Minister of Somalia in December 2014. His term ended on 1 March 2017.

=== Somali Police Force and Somali National Army ===
The Somali Police Force is the national police force and the main civil law enforcement agency of Somalia. It served from 1960 to 1991 as one of the principal organs of the Somali Armed Forces and, upon reorganisation, distanced itself away from the Armed Forces. While organised at a national level, each arm reports to a county police authority, which in turn divides its force by local Police Divisions, headquartered at local police stations; the police force was later reconstituted at the start of the 21st century.

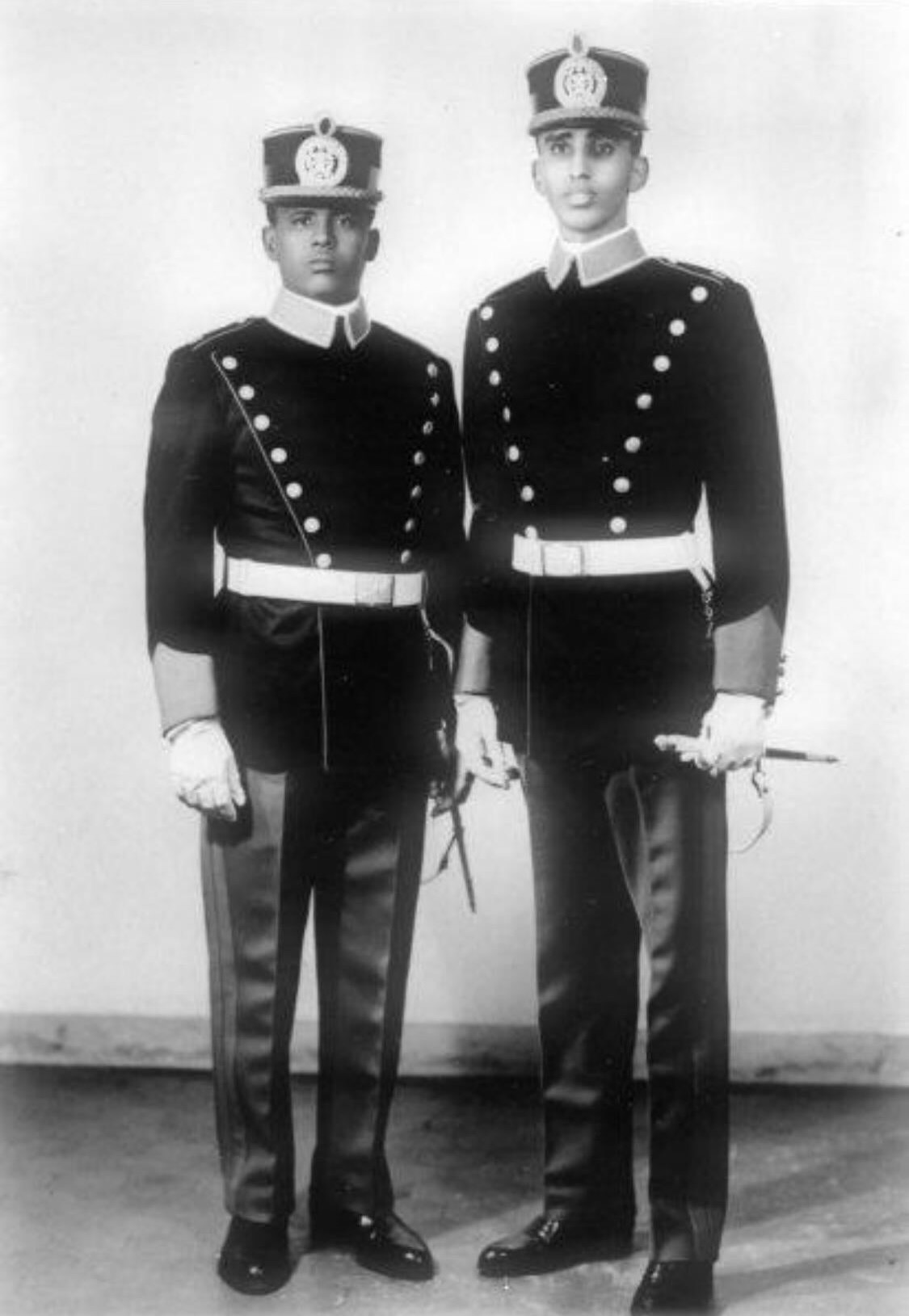
1960, Gen Cadde Muse(L) and Gen Muse Xasan Cabdulle(R). The first Somali graduates of Modena Military Academy

Mohamud Muse Hersi, commonly known as Adde Muse, was a former general in the Somali Armed Forces of long-time Somali president Mohamed Siad Barre. Adde Muse, the grandson of Hersi Boqor and great-grandson of Boqor Osman, was one of the first two Somali graduates of the internationally renowned Modena Military Academy.

From 1963 to 1965, He served as Secretariat to The Chief of Military Forces; 1965–67, Chairman of Horseed political party; 1970–72, Commander of the 21st Division, Somali National Army; and from 1972 to 1973, Chief of Training, Somali Military Forces. Adde later became a local and state governor in northern Somalia before the 1991 outbreak of the Somali Civil War. He also served as a military attaché to China during the mid to late 1970s. After his stint in China, he later relocated to Canada in 1979.

Mohamed Muse Hirsi passed 8 February 2017 in the UAE. He was 79 years of age.

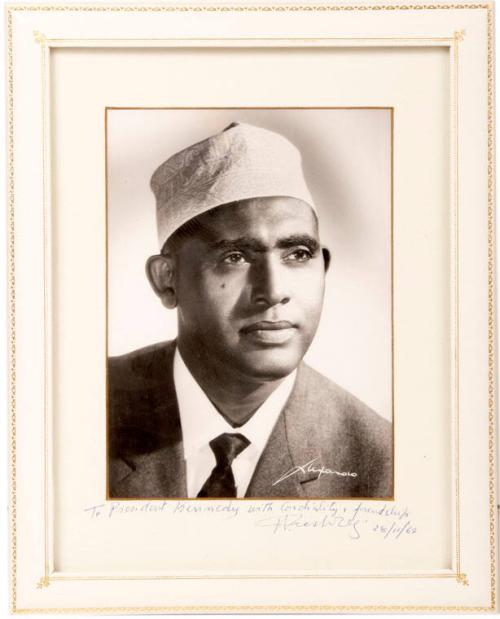
President Abdirashid Ali Sharmarke's portrait that was gifted to President John F. Kennedy

== Siad Barre Regime ==
=== President Abdirashid Sharmarke assassination ===
On October 15, 1969, while paying a visit to the northern town of Las Anod, Somalia's then President Abdirashid Ali Shermarke was shot dead by a policeman in his security team. His assassination was quickly followed by a military coup d'état on October 21, 1969 (the day after his funeral), in which the Somali Army and police force seized power without encountering armed opposition, essentially a bloodless takeover. The putsch was spearheaded by Major General Mohamed Siad Barre, who at the time commanded the army. For refusing to support Barre's seizure of power, numerous political figures were imprisoned. Among these were General Mohamed Abshir Muse of the Osman Mahmoud and Abdullahi Yusuf Ahmed of Omar Mahmoud. They and many others of political power were imprisoned for several years by the new military regime.

=== 1978 coup d'etat attempt ===
The 1978 Somali coup d'état attempt was a violent military coup attempt that took place in Somalia (then Somali Democratic Republic) on 9 April 1978, against the regime of President Siad Barre. The United States Central Intelligence Agency estimated that the coup.

The coup attempt was staged by a group of disgruntled Army officers, led by Colonel Mohamed Osman Irro, in the aftermath of the disastrous Ogaden War against Ethiopia (then ruled by the Mengistu-led Derg). The war was initiated by Siad Barre, who had himself come into power a decade earlier in the 1969 Somali coup d'état.

A CIA memorandum written the following month speculated that the coup was in response to Barre ordering the arrest and execution of officers that participated in the Ogaden War. The officers believed that Barre had intentionally used troops from other clans as "cannon fodder" while officers from his own Marehan clan were given safer orders. The report concluded that the officers involved in the coup.

The coup was launched on 9 April 1978. The bulk of the fighting concluded within the day.

Gunfire broke out at the village of Afgoy, south of the capital Mogadishu, and small-arms fire and explosions were heard on the outskirts of the capital. The coup was originally planned to start in Hargeisa, but Barre likely knew of the attempt in advance and was able to disrupt the coup before it launched, as well as position forces loyal to himself in the capital.

The CIA estimated that the coup involved around 24 officers, 2,000 soldiers, and 65 tanks oup "were motivated at least as much by long-standing ethnic animosities toward Barre as by disenchantment with his regime in the aftermath of the Ogaden debacle".

Following the failed coup, 17 alleged ringleaders were executed. Barre used the coup as justification to purge members of the clans involved in the coup from government and military positions. 12 Majeerteen clansmen were summarily executed by firing squad along with 5 soldiers of other clans including Hawiye, Issaq, and others. Of the Majeerteen soldiers put to death, 5 of them hailed from Omar Mahmoud including Irro, 4 of Osman Mahmoud, 1 Isse Mahmoud, and 1 Nuh Jibril.

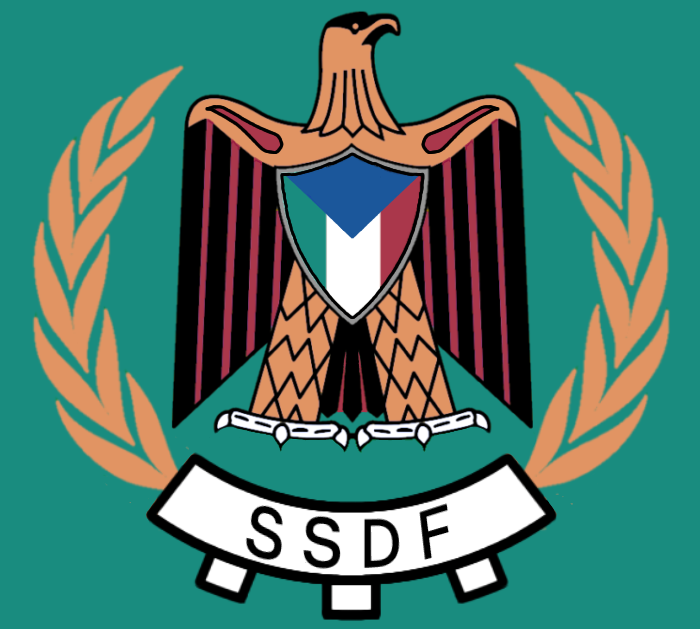
Somali Salvation Democratic Front

=== SSDF ===
One of the plotters, Lieutenant Colonel Abdullahi Yusuf Ahmed, escaped to Ethiopia and founded an anti-Siad Barre organization initially called the Somali Salvation Front (SSF; later the Somali Salvation Democratic Front, SSDF), initiating the Somali Rebellion and eventually the Somali Civil War. Somali Salvation Democratic Front, was a political and paramilitary umbrella organization in Somalia. Founded in 1978 by several army officers, it was the first of several opposition groups dedicated to ousting the authoritarian regime of Mohamed Siad Barre.

After the fall of the Barre regime, the SSDF (based largely in northeastern Somalia) was divided in two factions. Mohamed Abshir Musa controlled the political wing while Abdullahi Yusuf Ahmed led the armed wing from 1991 to 1998. There was a brief leadership struggle between the two parties, with Abdullahi Yusuf garnering the support of former military officials and Mohamed Abshir Muse the support from politicians associated with the civilian government of the 1960s.

== Puntland ==
=== Establishment of the Federal State of Puntland ===
Flag of Puntland

Following the outbreak of the Somali Civil War in 1991, a home-grown constitutional conference was held in Garoowe in 1998 over a period of three months. Attended by the area's political elite, traditional elders (Issims), members of the business community, intellectuals and other civil society representatives, the autonomous Puntland State of Somalia was established to deliver services to the population, offer security, facilitate trade, and interact with domestic and international partners.

Unlike the republic of Somaliland to its west, Puntland is not trying to obtain international recognition as a separate nation. However, both regions have one thing in common: they base their support upon clan elders and their organizational structure along lines based on clan relationships and kinship. However, a key difference was that Puntland was formed as a descendant-based entity unlike in Somaliland. The state was established as a "homeland" for the Harti community of Northern Somalia, whereby the Majeerten were deemed as the "chief architects" of the entity. Since its establishment in 1998, Puntland has also been in territorial disputes with Somaliland over the Sool, Sanaag and Ayn regions.

=== Jama Ali Jama and Abdullahi Yusuf ===
In November 2001, traditional elders elected Osman Mahamud ex-colonel Jama Ali Jama as the new Puntland President. Jama was a colonel in the Somali National Army from prior to the Barre regime to the mid-70s, promoted to chief ideologue of socialism in the Horn of Africa by the Soviet Union. Yusuf refused to accept the elders' decision on Jama as president, and in December 2001, he seized by force the town of Garowe, reportedly with Ethiopian support. In early May, Yusuf seized Bosaso and controlled Puntland in general. Forces loyal to Puntland president Jama Ali Jama, led by Adde Muse, withdrew from Bosaso without a fight to avoid the image of conflict between one clan/family in the public eye. Both Yusuf and Jama continued to claim the presidency, and there were continued efforts to resolve the conflict at year's end. A ban on political parties in Puntland remained in place.

=== President Adde Muse administration ===
After Abdullahi Yusuf's second term came to an end, he was succeeded by his vice president Mohamed Hashi who hailed from the Dhulbahante clan. After serving just over two months, Hashi lost his re-election bid to Mohamed Muse Hirsi.

In March 2005, President Muse began building the Bender Qassim International Airport.

In April 2007, Muse held meetings with Sheikh Saud bin Saqr Al Qasimi, the crown prince and deputy ruler of Ras al-Khaimah in the United Arab Emirates (UAE), where the two leaders signed an agreement on a deal for setting up of a dedicated livestock quarantine facility to facilitate the import of livestock from Somalia to the UAE. In October 2008, Muse also signed a Dh170 million agreement with Dubai's Lootah Group to support the construction of an airport, seaport and free zone in the coastal city of Bosaso. Muse indicated that "I believe that when we finish all these projects our people will benefit by getting good health services, education and overall prosperity."

=== President Said Abdullahi Dani administration ===
The Puntland parliament elected a new president on January 8, 2019, in a hotly contested presidential election. Former Federal Minister for Planning and International Cooperation Said Abdullahi Deni and Ahmed Elmi Karash were elected as president and vice-president of Puntland, respectively. Deni won 35 out of 66 votes from regional lawmakers in the third, and last round, defeating 20 other candidates. His closest challenger, General Asad Osman Abdullahi, former Puntland spy chief, received 31 votes.

The new president, 52, is widely known for his role in education in Puntland where he helped establish schools and universities. In 2017, he mounted an unsuccessful run for president of Somalia. Deni campaigned on promoting economic growth and fighting corruption in the relatively peaceful Somali region. "A new chapter has opened for this region, a chapter of unity and brotherly relations among Somalis," the new president said.

Puntland's outgoing president, Abdiwali Mohamed Ali, lost in the first round of the election with only eight votes. On January 8, 2024, Said Abdullahi Deni was re-elected as president of Puntland. He was voted in by 45 out of the 66 members of Parliament. He is the first president in Somalia to be re-elected in Somalia's nascent 64-year history.

== Clan tree ==
"There is no clear agreement on the clan and sub-clan structures and some lineages might be omitted." However, the following summarized clan tree presented below is taken from John Hunt's A general survey of the Somaliland Protectorate (1944-1950)

Mohamoud Saleban
  - Nuh Mohamoud (Bah-leelkase)
  - Xariir Mohamoud (Bah-leelkase)
  - Muse Mohamoud (Bah-leelkase)
  - Yahye Mohamoud (Bah-leelkase)
  - Omar Mahmoud Saleban (Bah-Dir)
  - Isse Mahmoud Saleban (Bah-Dir)
  - Osman Mahmoud Saleban (Bah-Dir)
    - Liban Osman
    - Adam Osman
    - Idris Osman (Bah-Gareen)
      - Adam Idris
        - Muse Adam
          - Mohamed Muse
            - Farah "Dhere" Mohamed
              - Mohamoud Farah
              - Mohamed Farah
              - Ali Farah
          - Ahmed "Saadaad" Muse
            - Ali Ahmed
            - Muse Ahmed
    - Hussein Osman (Bah-Gareen)
      - Dhuxul Hussein
        - Fahiye Dhuxul
          - Ali Fahiye
            - Cigalle Ali
      - Abdalle Hussein
        - Adam Abdalle
          - Mohamoud Adam
            - Muse Mohamoud
            - Osman Mohamoud
    - Yusuf Osman
      - Abdirihin Yusuf
      - Dini Yusuf (Bah-Leelkase)
      - Dudub Yusuf (Bah-Leelkase)
        - Omar Dudub
          - Ali Omar
            - Shirwac Ali
              - Fahiye Shirwac
                - Diiriye Fahiye
                  - Samatar Diiriy
                    - Gedi Samatar
      - Isse Yusuf
      - Farah Yusuf
      - Mohamed Yusuf
        - Elmi Mohamed (Baha-Dubays)
          - Muse Elmi
            - Hassan Muse
              - Samatar Hassan
                - Jama Samatar
                  - Ali "Qandali" Jama
                  - Mohamoud "Cilaaq" Jama
                    - Yusuf "Dhanto" Mohamoud
                    - Ahmed Mohamoud
                    - Isse Mohamoud
        - Ismail Mohamed (Baha-Dubays)
          - Yusuf Ismail Bah-Di)
          - Ali Ismail (Bah-Dir)
          - Ishaq Ismail (Bah-Leelkase)
          - Diini Ismail (Bah-Liibangashw)
            - Ahmed Diini
            - Siad Diini
            - Isse Diini
              - Yusuf Isse
                - Ali Yusuf
                  - Hassan Ali
                  - Samatar Ali
        - Aamir Mohamed (Baha-Dubays)
          - Mohamed Aamir ("Bah-Bulo")
          - Ahmed Aamir ("Bah-Abaskul")
          - Muse Aamir ("Bah-Dubays")
          - Isse Aamir ("Bah-Yacqub")
            - Idris Isse (Reer Idiris)
              - Gulled Idris
              - Farah Idris
                - Mohamed Farah
                - Isse "Maax" Farah
              - Caraale Idris
                - Ibrahim Caraale
                - Osman Caraale
                  - Mohamed Osman
                  - Mohamoud Osman
                  - Sead Osman
                  - Caduur Osman
                  - Ismail Osman
            - Hussein Isse
              - Mohamed Hussein
                - Ahmed Mohamed (Reer Axmed)
                  - Ibrahim Ahmed ("Bihni-Nuur")
                  - Nuh Ahmed ("Bihni-Nuur")
                  - Mohamed Ahmed ("Bihni-Nuur")
                    - Gulled Mohamed
                    - Farah "Dheere" Mohamed
                  - Samatar Ahmed ("Bihni-Sharmarke")
                  - Ali Ahmed ("Bihni-Sharmarke")
                  - Muse Ahmed ("Bihni-Sharmarke")
                    - Farah Muse
                    - Ali Muse
                    - Mohamed Muse
                      - Abdi "Madobe" Mohamed
                      - Mohamoud "Mirif" Mohamed
                      - Ahmed "Sajin" Mohamed
                      - Ali "Galayr" Mohamed
                - Omar Mohamed (Reer Cumar)
                  - Mohamed Omar
                  - Rage Omar
                    - Mohamoud Rage
                      - Ahmed Mohamoud
                      - Ismail "Faruur" Mohamoud
                      - Ahmed Mohamoud
                  - Samakab Omar
                    - Muse Samakab
                    - Ahmed Samakab
                    - Mohamed Samakab
                  - Ali Omar
                    - Ahmed "Yare" Ali
                    - Aw Yusuf Ali
                    - Adam Ali
                      - Muse Adam
                      - Nur Adam
                      - Sead Adam
                      - Ali Adam
                - Sharmarke Mohamed (Reer Sharmarke)
                  - Farah Sharmarke
                  - Khayr "Yare" Sharmarke
                  - Muse Sharmarke
                  - Sagaar Sharmarke
                    - Mohamed Sagaar
                    - Farah Sagaar
                    - Hassan Sagaar
        - Muuse Mohamed
        - Omar Mohamed
          - Samatar Omar
            - Hassan Samatar
              - Samatar Hassan
              - Farah Hassan
            - Mohamed Samatar
              - Hassan Mohamed
                - Farah Hassan
                  - Mohamed Farah
                  - Samatar Farah
            - Naleye Samatar
              - Yusuf Naleye
                - Ismail Yusuf
          - Guleed Omar
          - Yusuf Omar (Bah-ararsame)
            - Ishaq Yusuf
              - Yusuf Ishaq
                - Sharmarke Yusuf
                  - Yusuf Sharmarke
          - Ali Omar (Sultan Ali)
            - Dalal Sultan
            - Yusuf Sultan
              - Sharmarke Yusuf
              - Warfa Yusuf
                - Fahiye Warfa
                  - Faatax Fahiye
                  - Naleye Fahiye
                  - Hassan Fahiye
            - Muse Sultan
              - Ismail Muse
              - Fahiye muse
              - Mohamed Muse
                - Yusuf Mohamed
              - Samatar Muse
                - Farah Samatar
                - Sharmarke Samatar
              - Farah Muse
                - Ali Farah
                - Ugaryahan Farah
                  - Mohamed Ugaryahan
                  - Gulled Ugaryahan
                - Mohamoud Farah
                  - Fahiye Mohamoud
                  - Sharmarke Fahiye
                  - Ali Fahiye
                    - Osman Ali
                    - Mohamed "Jeenicad" Ali
            - Mohamud Sultan
            - Idiris Sultan
            - Ismail Sultan
            - Mohamed Sultan
              - Farah Mohamed
              - Ahmed Mohamed
              - Samatar Mohamed
              - Faahiye Mohamed (Boho)
              - Hassan Mohamed (Boho)
                - Mohamed Hassan
                - Ismail Hassan
                - Shirwac Hassan
                  - Ismail Shirwac
                    - Ali "Xangaag" Ismail
                  - Mohamed Shirwac
                  - Mohamoud Shirwac
                    - Mohamed "Warmajaanle" Mohamoud
              - Yusuf Mohamed
                - Muse Yusuf (Bah-Isxul)
                  - Ahmed Muse (Bah-Dhulbahante)
                    - Ali Ahmed
                    - Abdi Ahmed
                    - Samatar Ahmed
                      - Mohamed Samatar
                        - Jama Mohamed "(Reer Jaamac)"
                    - Xaydar Ahmed "(Reer Xaydar)"
                      - Jama Haydar
                      - Ahmed Haydar
                      - Geylan Haydar
                      - Ali Xaydar
                      - Yusuf Haydar
                      - Gulled Haydar
                      - Mohamed Haydar
                  - Sharmarke Muse (Bah-Dhulbahante)
                    - Hirsi Sharmarke
                      - Ali Hirsi
                        - Farah Ali
                          - Aw Ali Farah (Reer AwCali)
                  - Samatar Muse (Bah-Yacquub)
                    - Mohamed Samatar
                      - Muse "Jire" Mohamed (Reer Jire)
                        - Said Jire
                        - Mohamoud Jire
                        - Mohamed Jire
                        - Ahmed Jire
                  - Mohamed Muse (Bah-Dir)
                  - Diiriye Muse (Bah-Dir)
                    - Mohamoud Diiriye
                      - Mohamed Mohamoud "(Reer Maxamed Maxamuud)"
                        - Ali "Takar" Mohamed
                        - Yusuf Mohamed
                - Nur Yusuf (Bah-Isxul)
                  - Ali Nur
                  - Samatar Nur
                    - Gulled Samatar
                  - Cigalle Nur
                    - Jama Cigalle
                - Samatar Yusuf (Bah-Isxul)
                  - Ali Samatar
                  - Ismail Samatar
                  - Mohamud Samatar
                  - Muse Samatar
                  - Hussein "Karkaar" Samatar
                    - Samatar Hussein
                    - Mohamed Hussein
                      - Hassan Mohamed
                        - Caynab Hassan
                        - Ismail Hassan
                      - Fahiye Mohamed
                      - Elmi Mohamed
                      - Nur "Dhagey" Mohamed
                        - Hussein Nur
                        - Abshir Nur
                        - Omar Nur
                        - Askar Nur
                  - Hassan "Solobgooye" Samatar
                    - Mohamed Hassan
                    - Ali Hassan
                      - Abdi Ali
                      - Caraale Ali
                      - Aadan Ali
                    - Fahiye Hassan
                      - Hussein Fahiye
                        - Jama Hussein
                        - Hiirad Hussein
                        - Bille Hussein
                      - Mohamoud Fahiye
                        - Ali Mohamoud
                          - Mohamed Ali
                            - Ali "Xagar" Mohamed
                          - Hassan "San dhuub" Ali
                            - Ali Qotonshe Hassan
                            - Bayle Hassan
                            - Jama Hassan
                - Ismail "Ugaaryahan" Yusuf (Bah-Isxul)
                  - Mohamed Ismail
                    - Xayle Mohamed
                    - Ahmed "Gax-Gax" Mohamed
                  - Shirwac Ismail
                    - Naleye Shirwac
                      - Mohamed Naleye
                        - Yusuf Mohamed
                        - Ahmed Mohamed
                        - Hussein Mohamed
                        - Abdirahman Mohamed
                        - Caraale Mohamed
                          - Haji Ahmed Caraale
                          - Haji Adam Caraale
                          - Haji Osman Caraale
                          - Mohamoud Caraale
                          - Ahmed Caraale
                          - Yusuf Caraale
                  - Salah Ismail
                    - Adam Salah
                    - Sead Salah
                      - Nur Sead
                      - Abdi Sead
                      - Caraale Sead
                        - Muse Caraale
                        - Isse Caraale
                - Farah Yusuf (Bah-Dubays "Boohaaro")
                - Said Yusuf (Bah-Dubays "Boohaaro")
                - Hassan Yusuf (Bah-Dubays "Boohaaro")
                  - Warsame Hassan
                    - Ali Warsame
                  - Samatar Hassan
                    - Warsame Samatar
                      - Fahiye Warsame
                      - Colow Warsame
                - Mahamoud Yusuf
                  - Ugaaryahan Mahamoud (Bah-Dhulbahante)
                  - Cigale Mahamoud (Bah-Dhulbahante)
                  - Hirsi Mahamoud (Bah-Dhulbahante)
                  - Liiban Mahamoud (Bah-Dhulbahante)
                    - Yusuf Liban
                    - Mohamed Liban
                      - Cigalle Mohamaed
                        - Sharmarke Cigalle
                          - Ali Sharmaarke
                          - Diiriye Sharmarke
                          - Jama Sharmarke
                          - Fahiye Sharmarke
                    - Fahiye Liban
                      - Mohamed Fahiye
                        - Ali Mohamed
                        - Mohamoud "Geesood" Mohamed
                          - Nur Mahmoud
                          - Barre Mohamoud
                      - Salah Fahiye
                        - Ahmed Salah
                          - Guure Ahmed
                          - Harwaa Ahmed
                          - Madaxuroon Ahmed
                  - Hussein Mahamoud (Bah-Yacquub)
                  - Hassan Mahamoud (Bah-Yacquub)
                  - Shirwac Mahamoud (Bah-Yacquub)
                  - Waceys Mahamoud (Bah-Yacquub)
                    - Ali Waceys
                    - Gulled Waceys
                    - Mohamoud Waceys
                      - Gulled Mohamoud
                        - Isse Gulled
                        - Mohamed Gulled
                        - Ahmed Gulled
                  - Nuh Mahmoud (Bah-Yacquub)
                    - Sharmarke Nuh
                    - Ali Nuh
                      - Fahiye Ali
                        - Ali "Garow" Fahiye
                        - Guure Fahiye
                        - Farah Fahiye
                  - Omar Mahamoud (Bah-Yacquub)
                    - Samatar Omar
                    - Hirsi Omar
                      - Warfa Hirsi
                      - Isse Hirsi
                      - Samatar Hirsi
                      - Mohamed Hirsi
                        - Farah Mohamed
                          - Osman Farah
                          - Samatar Farah
                          - Muse Farah
                        - Ahmed Mohamed
                          - Caraale Ahmed
                          - Carshe Ahmed
                        - Osman Mohamed
                          - Farah Osman
                          - Hirsi Osman
                        - Isse Mohamed
                          - Farah Isse
                          - Diiriye Isse
                            - Mohamed Diiriye
                            - Nur Diiriye
                            - Ahmed Diiriye
                          - Yusuf "Waceys" Isse
                            - Shabeel Yusuf
                            - Farah yusuf
                            - Ali Yusuf
                            - Hori Yusuf
                            - Hassan Yusuf
                          - Gulled Isse
                          - Samatar "Dhalaweyne" Isse
                          - Osman Isse
                            - Farah Osman
                            - Hirsi Osman
                        - Kulan Mohamed "Reer Kulan"
                          - Guure Kulan
                          - Shirdon Kulan
                          - Fahiye "Samac" Kulan
                          - Shirwac Kulan
                          - Barre Kulan
                    - Sharmarke Omar
                      - Ahmed Sharmarke
                      - Hassan Sharmarke
                        - Ahmed Hassan
                          - Farah Ahmed
                          - Mohamed Ahmed
                          - Yusuf Ahmed
                          - Mohamoud Ahmed
                            - Mohamed "Qaal" Mohamoud
                        - Mohamed Hassan
                          - Haji Muse Mohamed
                            - Mohamoud Haji Muse
                              - Awmuse Mohamoud
                              - Sead Mohamoud
                          - Aw Hussein Mohamed
                            - Isse Aw Hussein
                          - Hassan Mohamed
                          - Ibrahim Mohamed
                          - Jibril Mohamed
                          - Hirsi Mohamed
                          - Osman Mohamed
                          - Gulled Mohamed
                          - Ali Mohamed
                  - Guled Mahamoud (Bah-Dir Rooble)
                  - Samatar Mahamoud (Bah-Dir Rooble)
                    - Farah Samatar
                      - Shirwac Farah
                        - Naleye Shirwac
                          - Ahmed Naleye
                  - Warfa Mahamoud (Bah-Dir Rooble)
                    - Gulled Warfa
                      - Ali Gulled
                    - Fahiye Warfa
                      - Naxar Fahiye
                    - Naleye Warfa
                      - Farah Naleye
                      - Gulled Naleye
                        - Jabir Gulled
                          - Ali Jabir
                          - Yusuf Jabir
                          - Mohamed Jabir
                  - Mohamed Mahamoud (Bah-Dir Rooble)
                    - Shirwac Mohamed
                    - isse Mohamed (Reer Ciise)
                      - Naleye Isse
                        - Samatar Naleye
                          - Shirwac Samatar
                          - Guutaalle Samatar
                        - Ismail Naleye
                          - Muse Ismaeil
                          - Sugule Ismail
                          - Sharmarke Ismail
                          - Caraale Ismail
                          - Farah Ismail
                    - Ali Mohamed "(Cali Canbar)"
                      - Adan Cali
                      - Xirsi Cali
                        - Yusuf Hirsi
                      - Warfa Ali
                        - Mohamed Warfa
                        - Samatar Warfa
                        - Caraale Warfa
                          - Ali Caraale
                          - Nuh Caraale
                        - Gulled Warfa
                          - Fahiye Gulled
                            - Ali Fahiye
                          - Samatar Gulled
                            - Mohamoud Samatar
                      - Yusuf Ali
                        - Nur Yusuf
                          - Shirwac Nur
                        - Sharmarke Yusuf
                          - Samatar Sharmarke
                        - Muse Yusuf
                        - Adan Yusuf
                        - Farah Yusuf
                        - Samatar Yusuf
                        - Ismail Yusuf (Bah-Dubays)
                          - Aw Muse "Darbadaalley" Ismail
                          - Gulled Ismail
                        - Xirsi Yusuf
                          - Gulled Hirsi
                            - Guure Gulled
                            - Ali Gulled
                          - Farah Hirsi
                          - Muse Hirsi
                          - Fahiye Hirsi
                        - Mohamud Yusuf "(Xawaadane)"
                          - Yusuf Mahamoud (Bah-Yacquub-keenadiid)
                            - Ali Yusuf
                              - Sultan Yusuf "Kenadid" Ali
                                - Sultan Ali Sultan Yusuf
                                - Osman Yusuf
                                - Muse Yusuf
                                - Mohamed Yusuf
                                - Ahmed Yusuf
                            - Sharmarke Yusuf
                            - Samatar Yusuf
                            - Mohamoud Yusuf
                          - Wacays Mahamoud (Bah-Yacquub-Keenadiid)
                            - Yusuf Waceys
                            - Mohamed Waceys
                          - Warfa Mahamoud (Bah-Yacquub-keenadiid)
                            - Fahiye Warfa
                          - Ali Mahamoud (Bah dhulbahante)
                            - Gulled Ali
                          - Gulled Mahamoud (Bah Leelkase)
                            - Mohamed Gulled
                            - Mohamoud Gulled
                            - Ali Gulled
                          - Shirwac Mahamoud (Bah Leelkase)
                            - Farah Shirwac
                          - Caraale Mahamoud (Bah Leelkase)
                          - Samatar Mahamoud (Bah Leelkase)
                          - Sharma'arke Mahamoud (Bah Leelkase)
                          - Farah Mahamoud (Bah Leelkase)
                          - Nur Mahamoud (Bah Leelkase)
                          - Naleye Mahamoud (Bah Leelkase)
                          - Ahmed Mahamoud (Bah Leelkase)
                          - Osman Mohamoud (Bahdir)
                            - Yusuf Osman
                              - Mohamoud Osman
                                - Osman Mohamoud
                                - Ahmed "Taajir" Mohamoud
                                - Yusuf "Qoobweyne" Mohamoud
                            - Nur Osman
                              - Osman Nur
                              - Yusuf Nur
                              - Ali Nur
                              - Mohamed Nur
                            - Sharmarke Osman
                              - Mohamoud Sharmarke
                              - Ahmed "Faratol" Sharmarke
                              - Mohamed Sharmarke
                              - Yusuf "Shankukibir" Sharmarke
                            - Ismail Osman
                              - Hirsi Ismail
                              - Omar Ismail
                              - Samatar Ismail
                            - Shirwac Osman
                              - Guray Shirwac
                              - Mohamoud Shirwac
                            - Mohamed Osman
                              - Ali "Cade" Mohamed
                            - Samatar Osman
                              - Haji Yusuf
                            - Hirsi Osman
                              - Farah Osman
                            - Waceys Osman
                            - Ali Osman
                              - Isse Osman
                            - Gulled Osman
                          - Omar Mohamud (Bahdir)
                            - Isse Omar
                              - Ismail Isse
                            - Ahmed Omar
                              - Ali Ahmed
                              - Isse "Gaab" Ahmed
                            - Shirwac Omar
                              - Mohamoud "Togax" Shirwac
                              - Mohamed Shirwac
                            - Ismail Omar
                              - Jama Ismail
                            - Ali Omar
                            - Muse Omar
                            - Osman Omar
                            - Samatar Omar
                            - Yusuf Omar

== Prominent figures ==
- Abshir Abdi Jama, commander in chief of Puntland Dervish Force from 2022 to 2023
- Abdirashid Ali Shermarke, first Prime Minister and second President of Somalia
- Ali Yusuf Kenadid, Somali ruler, second Sultan of the Sultanate of Hobyo

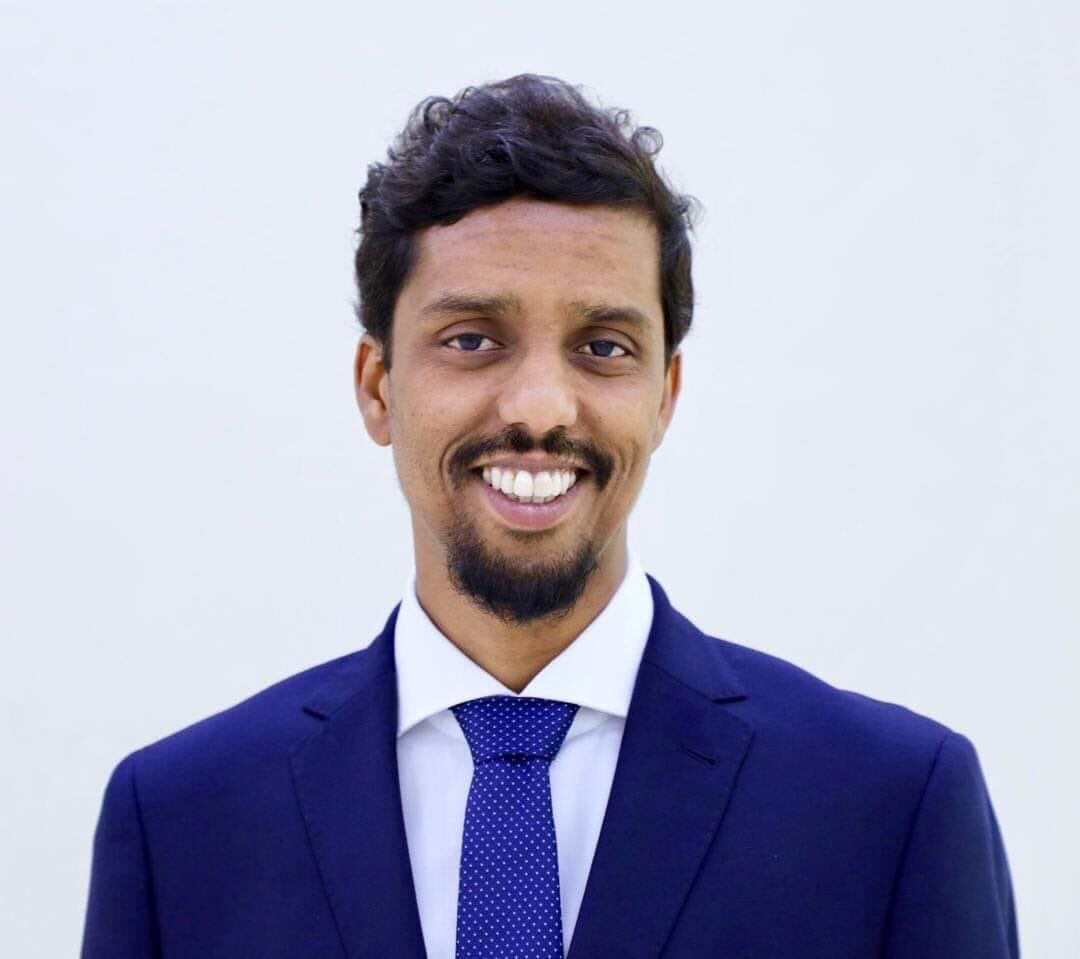
Asad Osman Abdullahi, Chief of the Somali Police Force, appointed on 26 September 2024

- Asad Osman Abdullahi, Chief of the Somali Police Force
- Boqor Burhaan Boqor Muuse, the 34th Majerteen and Darod king
- Faysal Ahmed, Somali actor, co-starred in the film Captain Phillips
- Haji Bashir Ismail Yusuf, first President of Somali National Assembly (1 July 1960), Minister of Health and Labor (1966–1967)

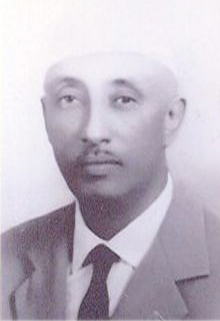
First President of Somali National Assembly, Haji Bashir Yusuf

- Haji Muse Boqor, son of Boqor Osman and first Minister of Interior, Somalia's president-elect following President Sharmarke's assassination
- Hodan Said Isse, former first lady of Puntland

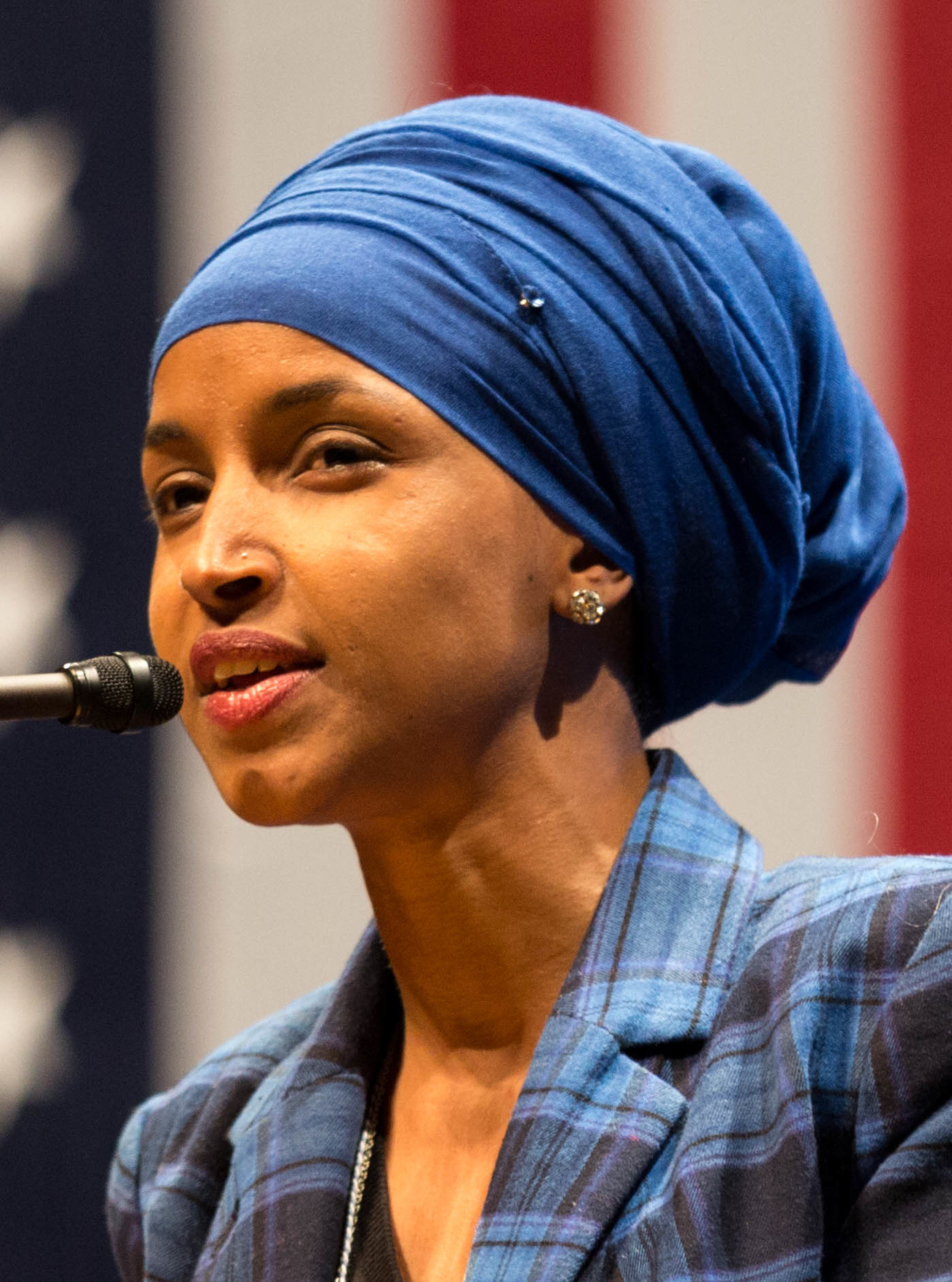
Ilhan Omar, the first Somali-American legislator in the United States

- Ilhan Omar, first Somali-American legislator in the US
- Jama Ali Jama, Somali army colonel and former President of Puntland
- Jawahir Ahmed, Somali-American model, winner of Miss Africa Utah pageant
- Khalif Isse Mudan, former Minister of Security of Puntland and Commander of the SAF Training Wing
- Mohamud Muse Hersi, former President of Puntland
- Omar Abdirashid Ali Sharmarke, Prime Minister of Somalia and son of Abdirashid Sharmarke
- Osman Mohamoud, the last king of Majeerteen Sultanate
- Osman Yusuf Kenadid, inventor of the Osmanya writing script
- Said Abdullahi Deni, current president of Puntland, former Minister of Planning of Somalia
- Saida Haji Bashir Ismail, former Finance Vice-Minister in the TNG
- Yaasiin Cismaan Keenadiid, author of the Somali Dictionary and founding member of the SYL
- Yasin Haji Osman Sharmarke, founder and important figure in the Somali Youth League (SYL)
- Yusuf Ali Kenadid, founder of the Sultanate of Hobyoone of the three prominent rulers of present-day Somalia at the turn of the 20th century

== Notes ==
The Majeerteen Sultanates
