= Isse Mohamoud =

Somali Sub Clan

Ciise Dhuux

Regions with significant populations
- Nugal, Lower Juba, Bari mudug sool

Languages
- Af-Somali, Arabic,

Religion
- Islam

Related ethnic groups
- Osman Mahmoud, Omar Mahmoud, Majeerteen

Isse Mohamoud or Eisse Mahmoud (Somali: Ciise Maxamuud; Arabic: عِيْسَىُ مَحَمُوْدً) is a prominent sub-clan within the Majertein clan in Somalia, comprising a significant population in four regional states primarily located in Puntland.

== Genealogy ==
The line of descent agreed upon by the ancestral family involves Eisse childbearing three sons: (Musse Eisse, Mohamed Eisse, Abokor Eisse)

1. Son of Eise (Ciise)
2. Son of Mohamoud
3. Son of Saleiman
4. Son of Mohamed
5. Son of Ibrahim
6. Son of Jibrahil
7. Son of Mohamed "Ummad-Nebi"
8. Son of Abdullahi "Tol-Jecle"
9. Son of Hassan "Himidor"
10. Son of Talareir (Talo-Reer)
11. Son of Mohamed "Walaal Yabare"
12. Son of Hijijle ″Xijiijle″
13. Son of Nolays
14. Son of Omar "Sorore / Nabidor"
15. Son of Awe ″Aawe″
16. Son of Mohamed "Bah-Majertein"
17. Son of Salah "Harti"
18. Son of Hantale
19. Son of Amlale
20. Son of Kombe "Abdi"
21. Son of Kablalah "Mohamed"
22. Son of Darod "Abdirahman bin Isma'il al-Jabarti"
23. Son of Jaberti "Ismaeil"

== Tribal chiefs (Issims) ==
Isse Mahmoud exhibits two distinct traditions, known as (Issims), within their cultural framework. However, despite the subdivision of the sub-clan into three subs, referred to as (Jifo), it is likely that they possess a comparatively lower number of traditional leaders, commonly referred to as (Sultan), in comparison to other tribes in Majertein.

- Islam Eise Islam Mohamed (Mouse Eise)
- Sultan Sa'eed Mohamed Garase (Abokor Eise)

== Clan tree ==
The structures of the clans and sub clans are not clearly agreed upon. However, the following summarised clan tree presented below is taken from John Hunt's A general survey of the Somaliland Protectorate (1944-1950):

- Mohamoud Saleban
  - Nuh Mohamoud
  - Xariir Mohamoud
  - Muse Mohamoud (Bah-leelkase)
  - Yahye Mohamoud (Bah-leelkase)
  - Osman Mohamud
  - Omar Mohamoud
  - Ise Mohamud
    - Mohamed Ise (Bah-Marehan)
    - Abukar Ise (Bah-Lelkase)
      - Osman Abukar
      - Hassan Abukar
      - Warfa Abukar
      - Ugar Abukar
        - Hassan Ugar
        - Idris Ugar
          - Hassan Idris
          - Yunis Idris
        - Ahmed Ugar (Axmed Kheyr)
          - Bah Dir
          - Bah Leelkase
        - Mohamed Ugar
          - Reer Faarax
          - Reer Yoonis
    - Muse Ese (Bah-Lelkase)
      - Ali Nur Muse
      - Nuh Muse
      - Mohamed Muse
        - Hussein Mohamed (Reer Xuseen)
        - Ahmed Mohamed
          - Mohamed Ahmed
          - Nuh Ahmed (Colmarabe)
          - Guled Ahmed (Culimo Cad)
          - Muse Ahmed (Reer Muuse Cad)
          - Aden Ahmed (Reer Aadan)
          - Ishaq Ahmed
            - Abdi Ishaq (Reer Cabdi)
            - Samakab Ishaq (Reer Samakaab)
            - Muse Ishaq
              - Naleye Muse
              - Mohamed Muse (Bah Awrtable)
                - Haydar Mohamed
                - Naleye Mohamed
                - Jama Mohamed
                - Liban Mohamed
                - Gulled Mohamed
              - Bi'idyahan Muse
                - Hassan Bi'idyahan
                - Hussein Bi'idyahan
                - Samatar Bi'idyahan (Reer Samatar)
                - Shirwa Bi'idyahan (Reer Shirwac)
                - Jarafle Bi'idyahan (Reer Jarafle)

== Notable people ==
- Abdirahman Mohamed Mohamud Farole — former president of Puntland.
- Ali Hayan — former governor of Nugaal (1994–1996).
- Abdi Farah — Minister of interior (Puntland)
- Abshir Omar Huruse — current Minister of foreign affairs (Somalia)
- Ahmed Isse Awad — former Minister of foreign affairs (Somalia)
- Hassan Abshir Farah — former Prime Minister of somalia
- Said Mohamed Hersy — former commander of the Somali National Army and Puntland Dervish Force
- Mohamed Abshir Muse — first Somali Police Officer
- Mohamed Said Farole — current Puntland Ministry of Planning (Puntland)
- Jimale Jama Takar — current military commander for Danab (Puntland)
