= Buri Peninsula =

Coordinates: 15°14′N 39°55′E

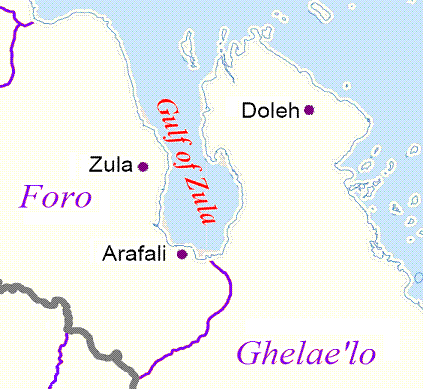
The Buri Peninsula and Gulf of Zula

The Buri Peninsula extends from central Eritrea north into the Red Sea.

== Geography ==
The Buri Peninsula is an area of land in the Ghela'elo subregion of Eritrea, that juts out into the Red Sea. To its west lies the Gulf of Zula, also known as Annesley Bay, with the village of Arafali at its head. To the north of the peninsula is the Massawa Channel and a group of islands, the Dahlak Archipelago, the largest and closest to the mainland being Dahlak Kebir. To the east of the peninsula lies Howakil Bay, a broad bay, scattered with islands, the largest of which is Howakil Island, and to the south lies a ridge of low hills. The peninsula is generally low and undulating, composed of lava flows at the southern end and granite at the north. It is about 50 km (30 mi) long and 35 km (20 mi) wide, with a constriction 20 km (12 mi) wide in the middle. Further inland to the south are volcanic hills, some conical and others located on ridges, with small sandy plains between them. The highest mountains on the peninsula is Mount Abdur near the west coast and Mount Dureli near the tip. There is a large salt-water lagoon near the middle. Much of the coast is fringed with reefs.

The western side of the peninsula is sandy with low hills in places. After the fishing village of Irafale, is a broad bay with black volcanic sand. The road crosses the peninsula beyond this point before continuing eastwards to Ghela'elo, the capital of the Ghela'elo subregion.

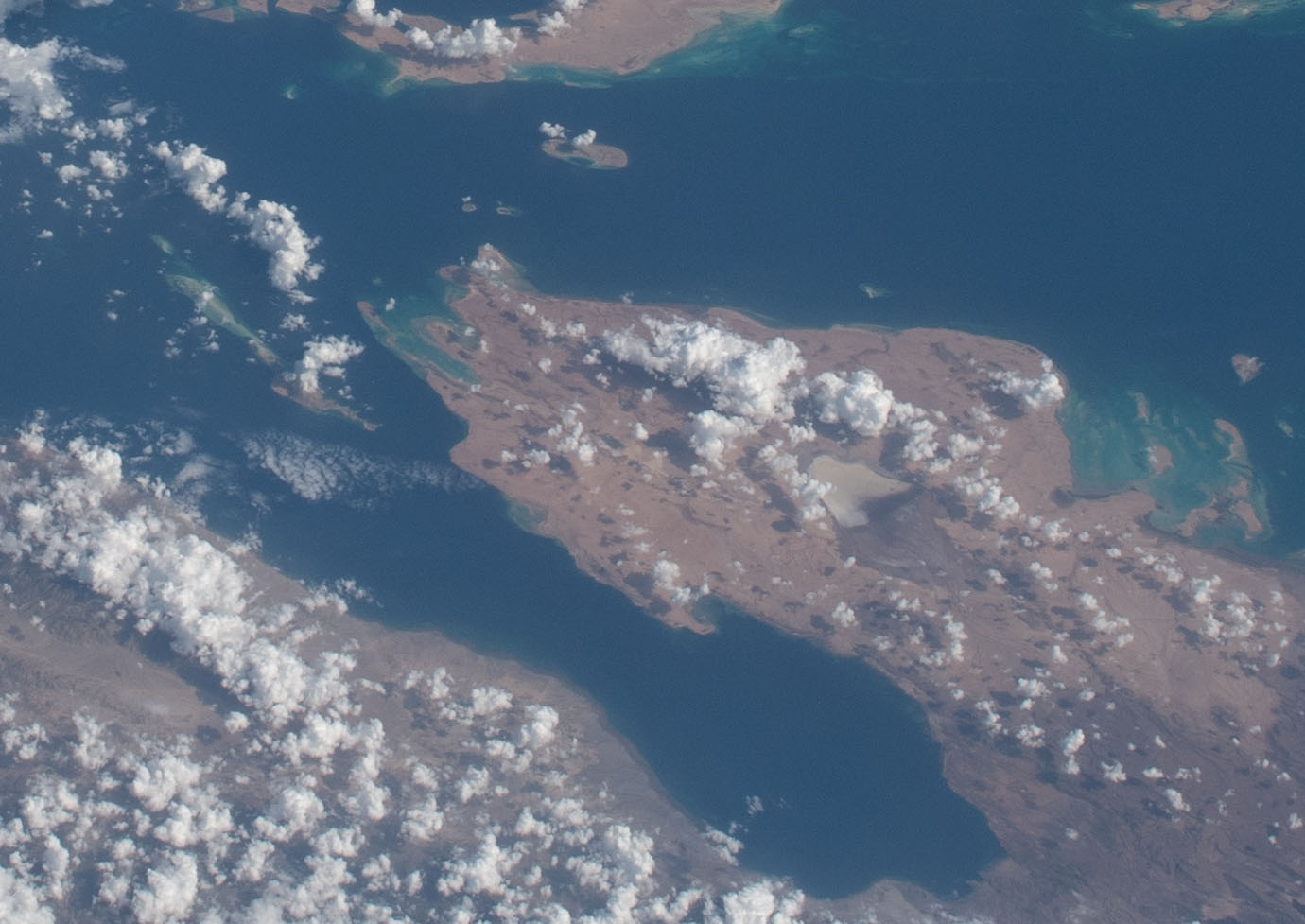
ISS-photo of Buri Peninsula, lake, clouds, coastal islands (in right side), Massawa Channel with Shumma, Dessie and Gulf of Zula

== Wildlife ==
Varied in geography, it features mangroves and salt pans. It is known for its wildlife, including ostriches, hamadryas baboons and wild asses. Stone tools were discovered within uplifted marine terraces near the small village of Abdur on the east coast of the peninsula.
