= List of ports in Eritrea =

This list of Ports and harbours in Eritrea details the ports, harbours around the coast of Eritrea.

== List of ports and harbours in Eritrea ==
Port/Harbour name	Region	Town name	Coordinates	UN/Locode	Max. draught (m)	Max. deadweight (t)	Remarks
Port of Massawa	Massawa	Northern Red Sea Region	15°36′N 39°27′E	ERMSW	11	58802	Medium-sized port, also known as Port of Mitsiwa. The port is located at the northern end of the Gulf of Zula.
Port of Assab	Assab	Southern Red Sea Region	12°59′N 42°44′E	ERASA			Medium-sized port.
