= Geri Koombe =

Somali clan

Geri Koombe جرئ كومبي

Languages
- Somali

Religion
- Islam

Related ethnic groups
- Majeerteen, Dhulbahante, Warsangali, Marehan, Ogaden and other Darod groups.

The Geri Koombe (Somali: Geri Koombe, Arabic: جرئ كومبي ) is a sub-clan of Darod, an archaic prominent Somali clan with the first mention of Garadship, the Geri clan have produced notable figures such as Ahmed Gurey and his brother in law Garad Matan. During the early middle ages, the Gidaya Kingdom emerged as a significant power in the 12th century, later establishing itself as an autonomous polity allied with the Adal Sultanate. Thirteenth century Arab writer al-Mufaḍḍal documents a Geri king of Gidaya ruling Shewa named Yusuf ibn Aarsame Arab manuscripts also identify a later ruler known as Sihab al-Din Gidaya Girri, who is identified as the lord and principal ruler of Gidaya

The Geri Koombe are renowned for their Christian highland conquest in Abyssinia during the 16th century where they spearheaded the conquest of Abyssinia which resulted in the islamisation of nearly half of Ethiopia and the siege of Aksum. Three centuries later, a British explorer Sir Richard Burton came into the Geri country, In 1858, Garad Adan was the leader and he controlled the geography between Jigjiga and Harar, He had 5000 troops. To the north of Jigjiga was controlled by Garad Adam and to the South was Garad Hirsi of the Bertire. According to Richard Burton, Garad Adan was a relative of Amir Nur who was the ruler of Garad.

== Gidaya kingdom 12th - 14th century ==
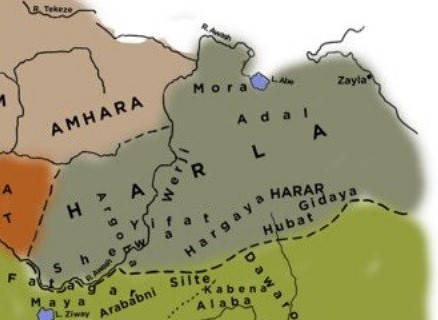

The advent of Islam facilitated the rise of Muslim kingdoms emerging from the Horn of Africa, Gidaya rose to prominence due their inland interior trade which extended as far as modern day Addis Ababa, this corresponds well with the findings of British archeologists confirming that Somali groups dominated the Ethiopian highland In the thirteenth century the Arab writer al-Mufaḍḍal mentions the king of Gidaya extending his authority s far as Shewa According to Dr. Lapiso Delebo the Gidaya kingdom was one of the Islamic states that had rapidly developed in the Horn of Africa from the ninth to fourteenth centuries Sixteenth century Adal writer Arab Faqīh, notes that the Gidaya Kingdom were part of the army of Ahmad ibn Ibrahim al-Ghazi during the Ethiopian-Adal war Ulrich Braukamper also states Gidaya may be associated with Geri clan of the Somali mentioned in the Futuh al Habasha who today live around Jigjiga, the presumed location of Gidaya state.

== Adal Sultanate 16th century ==
=== Familial ties ===
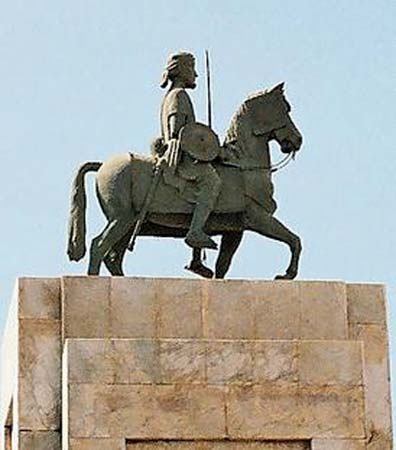
Statue of Ahmed Gurey (Ahmad ibn Ibrihim al-Ghazi)

The Imam Ahmed himself hails from the Reer Ibrahim, one of the largest sub-clan of Geri koombe. He was born in Tulli Guled, a known Geri Koombe town few kilometers away from Jig-jiga where one can find the ruins of his masjid. Also, Imam Ahmed's sister called Fardawsa was married to Garad Matan ibn Uthman Al Somali who hailed Reer Mohamud sub-clan of Geri Koombe and at the same time was one of the feared general who participated many Jihads in his lifetime thus, making the general the brother in-law of the imam and loyal general to his army. Moreover, the Geri Koombe were one of the earliest to accept the call of jihad they were the biggest supporters of the jihad against. For this reason, it has been said that the Geri koombe tribe had more than one reason to go to Jihad.

Hassan Ali Jama Writes

Imam Ahmed Garan overthrew the "Sa'daddin dynasty in Berbera on religious reform terms prior to launching his Islamic rebellion against the Christian monarchies reign over Abyssinia. Somali tribes, especially the Geri koombe of the Darod clan who became his immediate in-laws, were lined up behind him supporting him every step of the way

Tribe of Girri who came up.Their chieftain was Matan bin Uthman bin Khaled, the Somali. They showed off their weaponry and armour, paraded their horses and had their bows slung sash-like over their shoulders as they met the imam face to face. He commanded them then to go ahead to a place called Sim. Their chieftain had brought with him his wife, Fardusa, the sister of the imam Ahmad. And he set out ahead, he and his army. In the Battle of Amba Sel the chieftain of Geri, Garad Matan Bin Uthman was martyred. When the imam heard of the news of the death of his brother in law he cried becoming emotional he said the Islamic Istirja 'for verily we belong to Allah and we will return to him. The imam had prayed for him.

The companions of Garad Ahmusa who had been routed, reached the imam on the day of his march against the Amba. They informed him about what had happened. He was saddened on account of his brother-in-law Mattan, said the prayer Truly to God we belong, and unto Him do we return, and wept.

=== Role in Adal Sultanate ===
The Geri Koombe were one of the earliest to accept the call of jihad. They have also produced notable military commanders such as Garad Matan ibn Uthman Al Somali who was the brother in law of the imam, a knight serving under Adal Sultanate who then later progressed to becoming a military commander leading the Somali units in battle. The Geri Koombe were all renowned as horsemen.

He also sent a messenger to the tribe of Girri which was the tribe whose leader and chieftain was Mattan bin 'Utman bin Kaled, the Somali, his brother-in-law who was one of the heroic and gracious knights who died as a martyr in the battle for the Amba as will be recalled at some length later on. The storyteller, may God have mercy upon him, says: On the left was the Somali tribe of Harti, from the people of Mait; a people not given to yielding. There were three-hundred of them, famous among the infantry as stolid swordsmen. In the same way there was the tribe of Yibberi, around four-hundred infantrymen, archers. So the imam attached them to the five-hundred who held the centre, saying to them, 'Hold your positions; don't budge, anyone of you.' The tribe of Girri were all horsemen, renowned as riders.

Then he [the imam] tied a red standard to a spear and entrusted it to his brother-in-law Mattan bin 'Uthman bin Khaled, the Somali, their chieftain, their knight, and the most courageous, the bravest of them all. There rallied to him one-hundred-and-ten knights and three-thousand infantry, along with the tribe of Harti, the tribe of Jairan and the tribe of Mazra, all of whom were Somalis.

=== Leadership Role ===
The Geri Koombe tribe played a pivotal role in leadership, leading many of the Somali units in battle. this was due to the fact that the chieftain of Geri Koombe had direct familial ties with the imam. Garad Matan ibn Uthman Al Somali was described explicitly as one of the most bravest and courageous military commanders in Adal sultanate. The imam had then gathered all the Somali tribes and entrusted it to his brother in law Garad Matan ibn Uthman Al Somali.

So, after that, the Muslims stood their ground. The tribe of the Somali said it was the tribe of Harla that gave us away while the tribe of Harla said it was the Somali tribe that gave us away The imam split his forces into three divisions: all the Somalis were in one division whose command he entrusted to Mattan;

=== Bravery In Adal Sultanate ===
The Geri Koombe tribe played a pivotal role in leadership, leading many of the Somali units in battle. this was due to the fact that the chieftain of Geri Koombe had direct familial ties with the imam. Garad Matan ibn Uthman Al Somali was described explicitly as one of the most bravest and courageous military commanders in Adal Sultanate. The imam had then gathered all the Somali tribes and entrusted it to his brother in law Garad Matan ibn Uthman Al Somali.

The Futuh Notes

The idol worshipers that were fighting alongside the Abyssinians did a surprise attack on the Muslims in particular the camp of Garad Matan ibn Uthman Al Somali, the idol worshipers crept on the Muslims and shot their arrows in the vicinity of Garad Matan ibn Uthman Al Somali. Matan had then mounted on his horse pushed the idol worshipers away all the way back to the mountains. none of the arrows had hit the Muslims.

The storyteller, may Almighty God have mercy upon him, says: When a quarter of the night had passed, there was a surprise attack on the perimeter of the camp by the idol-worshippers who had fought the Muslims on the terrace of the mountain. They shot their arrows into the area where Mattan the Somali was. He mounted his horse and put them to flight in the dark until he drove them back up the mountain. Then he returned to his camp. None of arrows hit the Muslims.

The Geri Koombe clan was the most loyal and closest to the imam due to them being his in laws. In one battle some of the Muslims had fled from battle, The tribe of Geri and Jidwaaq were the only ones to not flee from battle they stood their ground.The author of the futuh ( who was present at the time ) praises the Geri tribe saying they fought a fine jihad. The Futuh Notes

As for what happened to the Muslims when the fighting became unbearable they took to flight, with the infidels in pursuit, and were killed by them in a devastating slaughter. Some of them were captured, but three-thousand of them died.Their chieftains however stood firm Mattan bin Utman the Somali brother-in-law of the imam Ahmad may the Most High God have mercy upon him, fought a fine jihad. Holding firm with him was Ahmad Girri; and 'Ali Garad, Mattan's brother; and Farasaham Tal, brother of Besara and 'Ali Mad Jira from the tribe of Mattan; and Husain Musa Bin *Abd Allah Makida; and Yussef Latahia from the tribe of Ahmad Girri. Their achievements this day truly are God's doing.

== Killing of The Governor Of Gondar ==
Ali Madjir who was the brother of Garad Matan fought a vericous battle, In that Ali Madjir killed the governor of Bagmeder which is modern day Gondar a predominant amhara population. the Muslims vanguards were positioned on the hill and launched an attack, one of the Muslims murdered Takala iyasu, In this battle number of high ranking Patricians were killed. 121 patricians were killed by the Adalites.

Futuh Al Habesh Notes

The patrician Kefle governor of Oeda, son of Takla lyasus, was also captured, by an equerry of the imam named Hasan. The patrician Giyorgis, governor of Goijam, was captured by an equerry of Farasaham "Ali. Azmad Yeshaq, governor of Bagemder, was killed by 'Ali Mad Jir from the tribe of Mattan the Somali.

== 18th century ==
Richard Francis Burton describes the Geri clan as one of the most powerful clans in the region under Garad Adan powerful chief at the time, he also articulates that the Geri had unmerciful precautions against the Gallas who had bordered the Somalis at the time. the Geri Koombe possessed and controlled over 180 villages and were armed heavily. possessing heavy 5000 weapons.

The Girhi or "Giraffes" inhabiting these hills are like most of the other settled Somal, a derivation from Darud and descended from Kombo. Despite the unmerciful persecutions of the Gallas, they gradually migrated westwards from Makhar, their original nest, now number 5000 shields, possess about 180 villages, and are accounted the power paramount. Though friendly with the Habr Awal, the Girhi seldom descend, unless compelled by want of pasture, into the plains

Garad Adan Bin Kooshin was the supreme Garaad of Geri Koombe and was well documented by the British explorer Richard burton

Burton writes

The Gerad Adan was powerful, being the head of a tribe of cultivators, not split up, like the Bedouins, into independent clans, and he thus exercises a direct influence upon the conterminous racesFurthermore, Richard Burton concludes that the Geri were one of the most powerful clans in east Africa along with the Marehan who they were allied and affiliated with, also the Ogaden a powerful clan. Burton mentions the most powerful clans in East Africa

In the Eastern Horn of Africa, and at Ogadayn, the Marayhan is a powerful tribe, here it is un-consequential, and affiliated to the Girhi. The Abaskul also lies scattered over the Harar hills, and owns the Gerad Adan as its chief. This tribe numbers fourteen villages, and between 400 and 500 shields, and is divided into the Rer Yusuf, the Jibrailah

== The Geri Revolt 1912 ==
The Geri Revolt was one of many rebellions by the Geri Koombe clan against the Ethiopian empire, resulting in tense fighting against the Amharic Monarchy, this was a major uprising across large parts of Somali galbeed. Moreover, the Geri Koombe clan resisted heavily against the Ethiopian empire.

Somalis live in the town of Harar and are merchants and smiths. Between 1936 and 1911 the Italians attempted to set the Moslems, particularly the Gherri Somalis, against the Christian Amharas in Hararge, and Amhara-owned land was given to the Somalis. Most of the groups, however, with the exception of the Gherri Somalis who revolted in 1912 1936 and 1952

== Harar resistance ==
Historically, Somalis have lived in Harar for hundred of years, during the time of Menelik II, the people of Harar were being badly oppressed. king menilek wanted to annex the city of Harar. during the tense fighting the only people who had stayed behind to defend the city were Somalis in particular the Geri koombe's who fought ferociously while Emir Abdullahi fled from harar, The emir subsequently returned to harar and sought refuge the Geri's who had stayed behind

The emir managed to flee to Harar, from where he left the same night to go and take refuge with the chief of the Guerri tribe to the east of Harar, in the direction of Berbera.

== Emirs Of Harar kinship ==
It was noted very well the Geri koombe lived in harar historically and even fought for it . Garad Aden who was a powerful Garad of Geri had very close ties with the emirs of harar. it was also documented that Garad Aden had kinship with the emirs of harar.

Richard Burton writes

a prairie fire, a broad sheet of flame which swept down a hill and for awhile threatened to ignite the entire Barrnothing occurred to agitate even Somali nerves. All safely reached Wilensi a long straggling village belonging to the Gerad Adan, a powerful chief of the Girhi highlands, and, as already said, kinsman of the Amir of Harar. The Gerad was away but one of his wives ordered

== Population Of Geri Koombe ==
The population of Geri was well documented in Richard Burtons Books, In the 1800s the Geri were populated roughly at around 80,000 at the time. In the 1900s Geri and Jidwaaq had a joint population of 300,000, the last recorded census population of Geri was around 200,000

== Geri - Oromo Clashes ==
=== Origins of Jarso ===
Jarso are of Somali origin, Historically Somalis enslaved peoples of Oromo pastoral background that were captured during wars and raids on Oromo settlements. The Girhi Garads wanted meet the demands of menial labour and farming eventually they would bring Oromos to work on the farms of chinaksan ( jinicsani ) and surrounding areas of Fafan. Shortly after tense fighting the Jarso (OLA backed) eventually seceded from the Somali region and joined Oromia after a 2004 referendum.

Tobias Hagmann states

The Gerri clan is a genealogical offshoot of the dominant Darood clan family of the Somali. The Jarso originally belong to the three major Oromo confederacies of the former Hararge province However those Jarso who are somali speaking use the Somali language and the Somali traditional administrative institution/contract xeer and are known as 'Somalized Oromo

=== Geri - Oromo Hierarchy ===
Naturally there was a hierarchy between the Somali Geri and Somali-ized Jarso ( Oromo ) The Jarso expressed that they a have lower social status compared to Geri Somalis and felt the need of gaining equal social status with the Geri's who were the local aristocratic nobles.

Dr Tim Allen writes

The conflict is between the 'Somali-ized' Jarso and the Somali clan, the Geri who like the Marehan belong to the Darod clan-family. Ostensibly the problem is over rights to territory, but the Jarso appear to have been mainly concerned with gaining equal status with the Geri clan. The Jarso claim that the Geri who were the traditional local aristocracy, regard them as lowly and do not even marry their daughters

Prof Didier Péclard also writes

The Gerri became the local aristocratic clan, while the Jarso being a greater group numerically - were reduced to being tenant farmers. Relations between the Gerri and the Jarso have been more strained and turbulent in recent decades, with the latter attempting to disrupt the hierarchical structure that has existed between the two groups. The transformation of Ethiopia's state into an ethnic federation, as well as the subsequent process of establishing intra-federal boundaries, compelled a renegotiation of identity between the two communities. The Gerri and Jarso are now divided between the Oromia and Somali regions as a result of this process.

=== Jarso secession from Somali state ===
In 1992 there was a wave of clashes and tensions in the Somali-Oromo boarder, tensions rose after Oromia liberation front tried to open a party office to rally support for Jarso. This subsequently led to full scale clashes. Prior to these events Jarso representatives felt that joining Oromia State would benefit them more.

Prof Didier Péclard writes

some Jarso ethnic entrepreneurs, who felt that in the new ethnic federal structure in Ethiopia, their interests would be better served by joining the Oromia region than staying within the Somali region, began to rally behind Oromo political movements such as the OLF and the Islamic Front for the Liberation of Oromia (IFLO).

The Geri Somalis vs Oromo Jarso saw a largescale of conflict with the IFLO and OLF allying with Jarso, while the Geri were backed by Jidwaaq and Somali region, Alternatively this conflict turned into an ethnic war between Somalis and Oromos. the ethnic war was so tense that retired and ex army soldiers from Somalia and Ethiopia played both sides.

This conflict saw the involvement of Oromo armed movements like the IFLO on the side of the Jarso, and Darood Somali clans, particularly the Jijiga-based Jidwak on the side of the Gerri. The inter-ethnic war was intense and both parties used heavy weapons such as cannons mounted on vehicles. Ex-soldiers of the disintegrated armies of Somalia and Ethiopia participated on bothsides.

=== Jarso 2004 Referendum ===
In 2004 the course of the Somali region would change forever, in 2004 the Ethiopian government staged a regional state referendum. in 2004 Jarso voted to be apart Oromia state and seceded from Somali regional state.

Some elders and influential personalities within the Jarso saw the referendum as an opportunity to decide conclusively on the land question and their group's subservience to the Gerri. They began to campaign in favour of joining the Oromia region.

== Lineage ==
The children of Darud are now divided into two great bodies: "Harti" is the family name of the Dulbahanta, Ogadayn, Warsangali and Mijjarthayn, Deshiishe. who call themselves sons of Harti bin Kombo bin Kablullah bin Darud: the other Darud tribes not included under that appellation are the Girhi, Berteri, Marayhan, and Bahabr Ali.

Geri who was the brother of Harti, Had 12 sons the dominant son of Geri was Awbarre. Hassan the son of awbarre had prominent descendants such as the Abayonis and Ishaaq Hassan

- Shiekh Darod (Daarood bin Ismaciil)
  - Kabalah
    - Koombe
      - Geri
        - Mahamed Geri
        - Abroon Geri
        - Burhan Geri
        - Cabdi Geri
        - Libaan Geri
        - Aadan Yare Geri
        - Magan Wayne Geri
        - Teerago Geri
        - Coofle Geri
        - Hayraan Geri
        - Aw Beere Geri
        - ilkaxume geri
          - Hasan Aw Barre
            - Abayoonis Hasan
              - Sheikh Maame Abayoonis
              - Fiqi Yoonis Abayoonis
              - Sheikh Dhaa Abayoonis
              - Jibriil Abayoonis
              - Sheikh Muuse Abayoonis
              - Sheikh Ahmed Bare Abayoonis
              - Sheikh Ali Abayoonis
            - Cumar Hassan
            - Yusuf Hasan
            - Ishaaq Hasan

== Notable people ==
=== Royalty ===
- Garad Matan ibn Uthman Al Somali 16th Century Adalite General & Brother In Law Of Imam Ahmed Bin Ibrahim Al Ghazi
- Garad Adan Bin Kooshin Supreme Garaad Of Geri Famously documented by Richard Burton in the 1800s

Abdirizak Ibrahim Takhal (Zak Idan) Tukwila City Council Member, Washington State, USA.
