= Bicidyahan =

Somali sub-clan of Majeerteen, Harti, Darod

Bicidyahan بعديهن
- Darod Somali clan
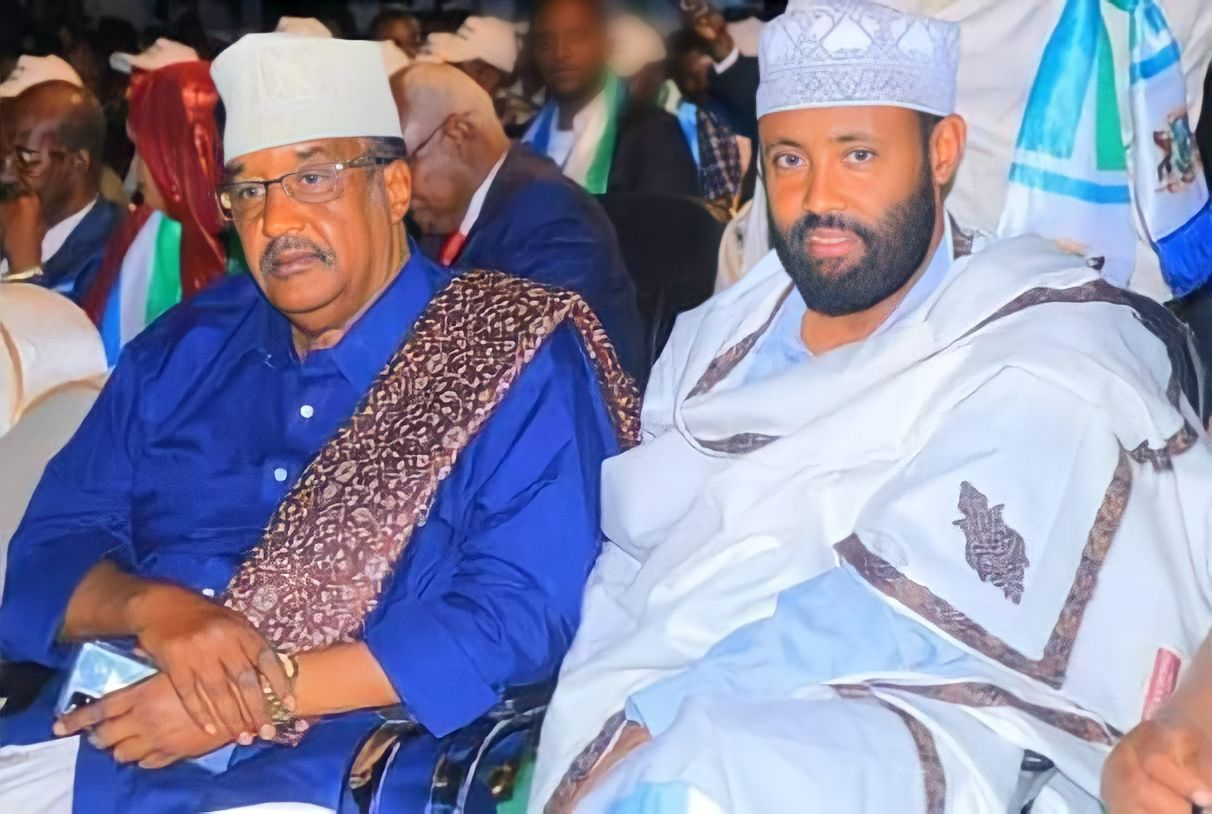
- Bicidyahan Sultan
- Ethnicity: (Somalia) Somali
- Location: (Somalia) Somalia; Ethiopia
- Descended from: Ali Ibrahim Jibrael Mohammed Harti
- Parent tribe: Majeerteen
- Branches: Saeed: Abdikarim; Yonus; Musa; Ismael; Mahamud; Adan; Osman
- Language: (Somalia) Somali (Arab League) Arabic
- Religion: Sunni Islam

The Bicidyahan (Somali: Reer Bicidyahan, Arabic: بعديهن) are Somali sub-clan part of the larger Majeerteen branch of Darod clans. Bicidyahan is the nickname of Ali Ibrahim Jibra'il, the forefather of the clan.

== Overview ==
The Bicidyahan is a sub-clan of the Majeerteen clan family, within the larger Harti clan and thereafter the Darod clan. Its members inhabit the eastern Ogaden region of Ethiopia and are primarily found in and around the Wardher Region zone. They also have a large presence in Mudug, Nugaal, and Jubbada Hoose, specifically in the cities of Galkayo and Kismayo smaller populations can also be found in Garowe. Reer Bicidyahan is a nickname for people descended from Ali bin Ibrahim ibn Jibril.

== Etymology ==
The name Biciidyahan means Oryx Hunter in Somali.

== Clan tree ==
There is no clear agreement on the clan and sub-clan structures and many lineages are omitted. The following listing is taken from the World Bank's Conflict in Somalia: Drivers and Dynamics from 2005 and the United Kingdom's Home Office publication, Somalia Assessment 2001.Waceys)

Ali Ibrahim (Bicidyahan)
  - Abdi Ali
  - Hussein Ali
  - Abokor Ali
  - Ismail Ali
    - Sugulle Ismail (Reer Sugulle)
  - Said Ali
    - Abdikarim Said
    - Yonis Siad
      - Ismail Yonis
      - Muse Yonis
        - (Reer Ali Guray)
        - (Reer Adan Cade)
        - (Reer Faarax Faraqle)
      - Mohamud Yonis
        - Mohamed Mohamud (Reer indho yar)
        - Abdille Mohamud (Reer Gabdoon)
      - Adam Yonis
        - Salah Adam (Reer Xaamid)
          - Yaxye Salah
            - Elmi Yaxye
            - Ali Yaxye
            - Jimcaale Yaxye
            - Waceys Yaxye
            - Mohamed Yaxye
            - Gulled Yaxye
            - Sharmarke Yaxye
        - Xamid Adam
          - Mohamud Xamid
          - Cigal Xamid
          - Fiqi Gadiid Xamid
            - Cadawe Gadiid
              - Mohamud Cadawe
              - Ali Cadawe
              - Yahye Cadawe
        - Osman Adam
          - Abdi Osman
          - Mahad Osman
          - Said Osman
          - Roble Osman (Reer Rooble)
          - Mohamed Osman (Waranfiiq)
          - Faarah Osman (Gaal'eri)
            - Waceys Gaal'eri (Reer Waceys)(Bah-Dir)
            - Hildid Gaal'eri (Reer Xildiid)(Bah-Dir)
            - Hamid Gaal'eri (Reer Xaamid)(Bah-wagardhac)
            - Shirwac Gaal'eri (Reer Shirwac)(Bah-wagardhac)
            - Sharmarke Gaal;eri ( Reer Diini Sharmaake )(Bah-Habar Jeclo) (Gafarey)
            - Samatar Gaal'eri (Reer Samatar)(Bah-Habar Jeclo) (Gafarey)
            - Mohamed Gaal'eri (Bah-Habar Jeclo) (Gafarey)
              - Gulled Mohamed (Reer Guuleed Maxamed)
              - Gabarow Moahmed (Reer Gabarow Maxamed)
              - Sugulle Mohamed
                - Ali Sugulle (Reer Cali Sugule)

== History ==
=== 16th–18th century ===
The Bicidyahan sub-clan trace their origins back to a late 16th century ancestor, Cali Ibrahim, who is buried in the present day Qandala District of Bari, Puntland. In the mid 17th century, the Bicidyahan sub-clans began to migrate away from their homeland and started an expansion campaign from the Bari region, spearheaded by their then Sultan, Aadan Yoonis.

By the late 17th century, the Bicidyahan had crossed Nugaal into Mudug, joining the southern Majeerteen sub-clans of Idigfacle, Gumasoor, Amaanle, and Abdalla Nolays. At the time, the southern Majeerteen were engaged in a prolonged conflict with a group they referred to as the “Galla Madow” (meaning “black infidels”), whom they regarded as pagans. This group controlled many of the region’s key water wells, giving them a strategic advantage. Their most important well, known as Baraxley, was located in what is now Gaalkacyo.

With the arrival of the Bicidyahan, the southern Majeerteen's ranks swelled and they elected the grandson of Sultan Adan Yonis, Sultan Farax Cismaan Adan, to lead them against their pagan adversaries. In the early 18th century, Sultan Farax led many campaigns into the pagan heartland, the most famous being the "raid of the Galla-eri" (pagan expeller) that brought an end to the war.

=== The raid of 'Galla-eri' ===
After a long stalemate the pagans still remained strong in their remaining settlement of Baraxley. Enrico Cerulli narrates in his book 'Somalia: Storia della Somalia. L'Islām in Somalia. Il Libro degli Zengi' that the Galla would boast about their land and abundance of livestock, singing in Somali:

"If from Baraxley I go up to the White hill,

If my flock disperses, I do not know [otherwise] of hunger and do not fear it"

Cerulli would then go on to further state:

"The Majeerteen having tried in vain to drive the Galla off that land in various expeditions, they finally resorted to a stratagem: they cut a large number of cowhides into long strips; each knight had a certain number of these stripes which were tied to the tail of the war horses; then the group on horseback launched by surprise, during the night, a great gallop against the Galla. These, frightened by the strange noise that the strips of skin dragged by the running horses made echo in the great plain, believed they were attacked and ran away, abandoning their base"

After this final battle, the fleeing Galla were hacked down and Sultan Farax Cisman was henceforth given the nickname of Gallaeri(expeller of pagans), a name that survives within the Bicidyahan sub-clan that descend from him.

=== 19th century ===
In the ensuing century, the Bicidyahan were led by two competing Sultans: Sultan Ducaale Hadal-Wanaajiye of the more numerous Bah-Gafar (Samatar, Mohammed, Sharmarke) Gaalo-eri, and his rival to the west, Sultan Shirre Baalle of the Bah-Dir (Wacays, Xildiid) Gaalo-eri. As noted by the Italian explorer Luigi Robecchi Bricchetti in his book "Tradizioni storiche dei Somali Migiurtini raccolte in Obbia", the Bicidyahan were represented by “Shire Baalle, for the Reer Bah Dir of the westernmost part, and Ducale Caadil Vonanagi, for the more numerous Reer Bah Gafar.”

They Bicidyahan would later expand into the Geladi and Wardheer pasturelands, putting them into direct conflict with a number of tribes. This culminated into open war when their then allies, the Marehan were attacked in Geladi during the late 1870s. The Italian book 'Rassegna italiana politica letteraria' provides a brief synopsis of the event, stating:

"About seventy years ago, a group of Ogadèn pushed back as far as Gorof, in the territory of Galàdi, with the intention of raiding the Marrehan cattle and gathered there for the abundance of pastures; but they were driven back, although the Marrehans suffered severe loses and their leader Gogge Mahmud Nur himself fell.

In revenge for the Marrehan, Rer Bicidyahan and Omàr Mahmud, chased the Ogadén and inflicted on them such a defeat at the wells of Wardheer that The Ugas, or head of the Ogadén, Fara Addo, also fell to the Reer Wegeida horsemen, being shot in the face by Gogge Mahmud Nur men– the survivors sheltered in Gorrahèi to not be exterminated.

The following year, the Marrehan and the Majeerteen at the Gherlogubi wells surprised a group of Rer Abdulle who had come to water their cattle; They attacked, killing many, and plundered the whole herd. Other clashes took place in Ghebdè. Dillimbash and Dahadid. There the Ogadèn, still armed only with sidearms, suffered bloody losses by the Majeerteen and Marrehan who for the first time used firearms, obtained by the Sultan Yusuf Ali.

Since then the Majerteen never abandoned the wells of Wardheer and the neighboring ones, and the Ogadèn never tried to return there."
