= Majeerteen =

Somali clan

Majeerteen ماجرتين
- Darod Somali Clan
- Ahmed Taajir, ruler of Bosaso in 1889
- Ethnicity: (Somalia) Somali
- Location: (Somalia) Somalia (Ethiopia) Ethiopia (Kenya) Kenya; Yemen (Oman) Oman; Eritrea
- Descended from: Abdirahman bin Isma'il al-Jabarti
- Parent tribe: Harti
- Branches: Wabeeneeye; Siwaaqroon; Cali Jibrahil; Amaanle; Ali Ibrahim Jibraehil; Ali Saleebaan; Ugaar Saleebaan; Maxamuud Saleebaan; Cismaan Maxamuud; Cumar Maxamuud; Nuux Maxamuud; Ciise Maxamuud
- Language: (Somalia) Somali (Arab League) Arabic
- Religion: Sunni Islam

The Majeerteen, (Somali: Majeerteen, Arabic: ماجرتين; also spelled Majerteen, Macherten, Majertain, or Mijurtin) alternately known as Mohammed Harti, is a Somali sub-clan part of the Harti branch of the Darod clan. Traditionally, they inhabit extensive territories in the Bari, Nugaal, and Mudug regions of Somalia, spanning from Bosaso to Garacad, mainly in Puntland state. Additionally, Majeerteen populations are present in southern towns such as Kismayo.

== Overview ==
The Majeerteen Sultanates played an important role in the pre-independence era of Somalia. The Majeerteen also held many other significant government posts in the 1960s and 1970s, and continue to play a key role in Puntland state and Somalia as a whole.

== Etymology ==
The name Majeertayn means much beloved or much admired in Somali and comes from the root word, Majeero, which means a strong attraction.

== Distribution ==
The Majeerteen are traditionally settled in Somalia's northern regions of Bari, Nugal and Mudug. They can also be found in Kismayo in southern Somalia due to migrations starting in the 19th century along with their fellow members of the larger Harti subclan, the Dhulbahante, Dishiishe and Warsangeli.

The Majeerteen are traditionally settled in the land in-between Murcanyo, Bandar Siyad an ancient port town facing the Gulf of Aden, and Garacad a coastal port town, facing the Indian Ocean and all the land in between which corresponds to the area encompassing the Horn of Africa. Therefore, the Majerteen are settled in what is literally considered to be 'the Horn of Africa'.

Some Majeerteen people are also found in the Somali Region in Ethiopia, specifically in the Dollo Zone near the Somalia border. The Majeerteen are part of Darod subclans within Somalia. The Majeerteen are more commonly found in the cities of Bosaso, Garowe and Galkacyo which are all regional capitals of Bari, Somalia, Nugal, Somalia and Mudug respectively.

Boqor Osman of the Majeerteen Sultanate

The Osman Mahmud (Cismaan Maxamuud), Omar Mohamoud (Cumar Maxamuud), and Isse Mahmoud (Ciise Maxamuud) comprise the Maxamuud Saleebaan; which, along with Ali Saleebaan and Ugaar Saleebaan, forms the major subclan of Saleebaan Maxamed (Majeerteen). A 2010 study identifies as both the main division of Majeerteen and a central and unifying entity in Puntland. During the 1960s, the Osman Mahamud, Ali Saleebaan (or Cali Saleebaan), Wadalmoge and Ciise.

Maxamuud formed a powerful business class in Kismayo, while Siad Barre exploited a rivalry between the Cali Saleebaan and Cumar Maxamuud in an effort to weaken the Majeerteen in general. Historically, the Majeerteen formed part of a coastal trading network around the Red Sea and the Indian Ocean, along with other subclans.

== History ==
=== Early Majeerteen history ===
The first recorded mention of the Majeerteen (Mijertayne Somauli) clan in English appears in a passage by Henry Salt, who described them as inhabiting the coast of Hafun under the leadership of a certain Sultan Hassan. Salt recounts that the Imam of Muscat had, sometime earlier, sent gifts to the Majeerteen and requested permission to construct a small fort on the coast of Hafun. This request, however, was declined, and the gifts were rejected, maintaining the tribe's independence.

A 1727 English account of a Somali pirate raid on an Indian ship seeking water near Ras Filuk, in current day Murcanyo, appears to be the earliest written record of possible Majeerteen pirate activity. The pirates slaughtered the entire crew except for two young boys and brought the Indian vessel to shore. They then sailed to Aden, where they sold the two boys into slavery.

=== Early Majeerteen maritime history ===
In the early 1700s, a Majeerteen religious sheikh named Omar left Somalia after fleeing incessant family quarrels over power and property. Feeling called to teach Islam in foreign lands, he arrived in Tadjoura, where the Ayrolasso Afar tribe welcomed him, gave him a wife, and integrated him into their tribal group. From this marriage, a son named Roble was born. Roble later had two sons, Ibrahim and Omar. Omar married Nagousse Fattou, the daughter of the Sultan of Tadjoura from the ruling Dini-Sarra clan. Their descendants became known as the Roble-Omarto subclan of the Ayrolasso. Ahmed-Dini, the great-great-grandson of the immigrant Majeerteen sheikh, became the Qadi of Tadjoura during the mid-1800s.

Majeerteen merchants played an important role in Red Sea and Indian Ocean trade networks during the 19th century. One notable figure was Yunus Buraale, a Majeerteen merchant and Nakhuda from the Abdirahim Ibrahim subclan. In 1808, Salt noted that Yunus, along with his brother and other Somali traders, had established a trading factory at Harena, an outpost on the Eritrean Red Sea coast, writing:

I also found a party of Somauli traders, who, under the direction of Yunus's brother, had established a small factory at this place for the purpose of carrying on an intercourse with the natives, an instance of enterprise strongly marking the superiority of the Somauli over all other African tribes on the coast. The chief exports consist of slaves, horses, cattle, goats, and ghee, of which latter very considerable quantities are always to be procured in the neighbourhood.

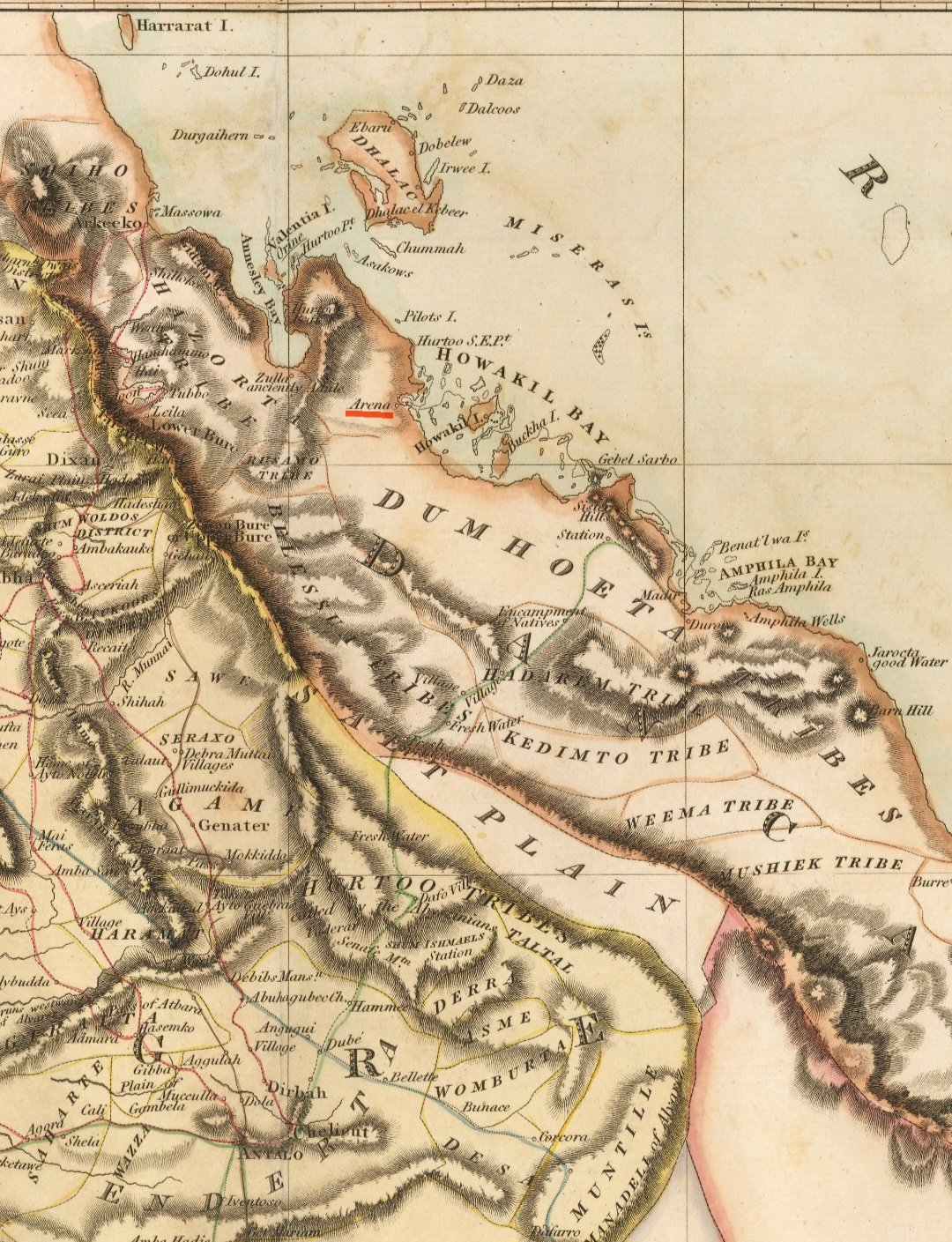
Harena, the location of the Majeerteen trading factor

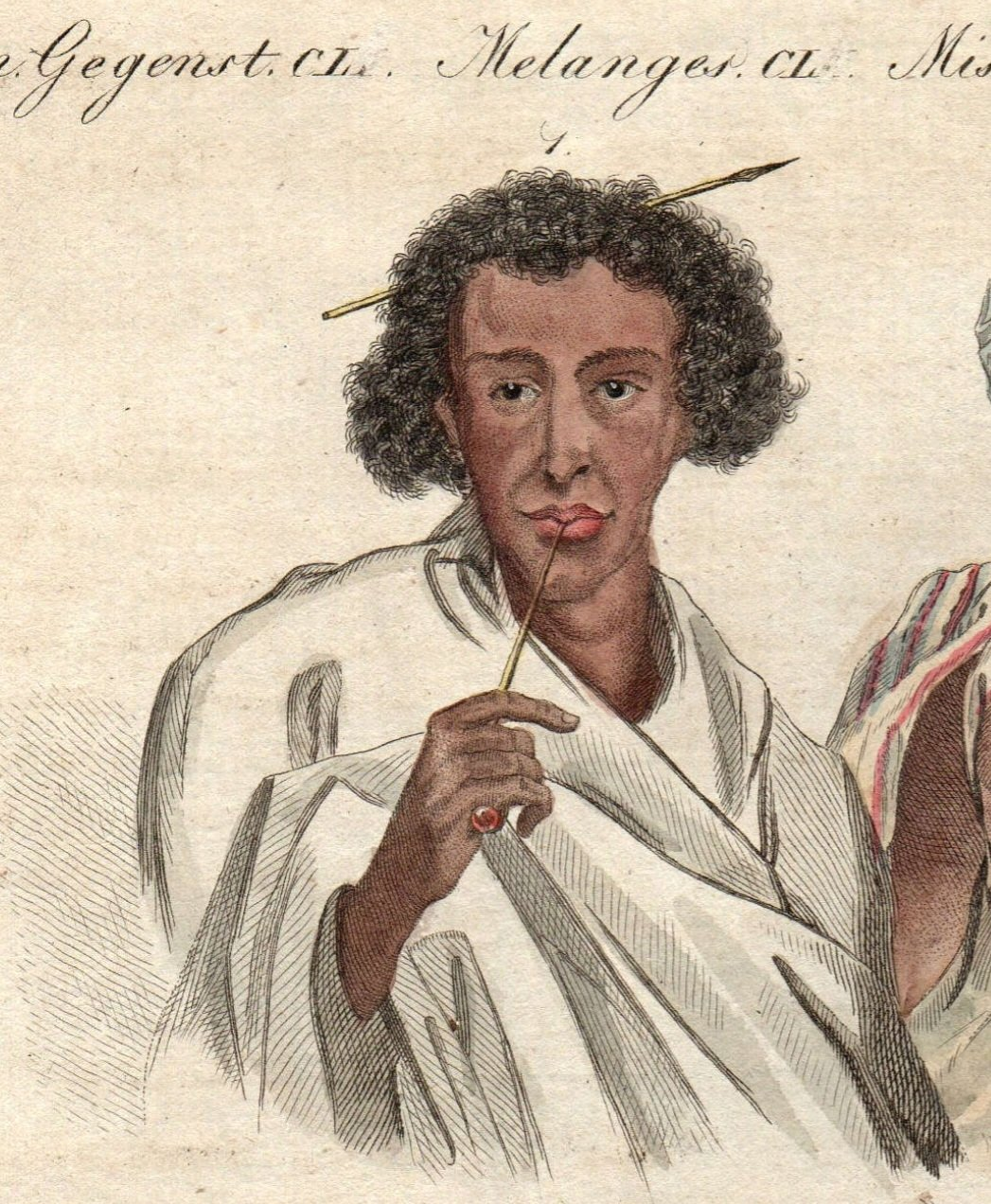
1809 depiction of Yunus Buraale by Henry Salt

Yunus's travels as recorded by Salt, George Annesley, and Nathaniel Pearce, took him across the Red Sea coast from Yanbu, Jeddah, Suakin and Massawa to Tigray, where George Annesley met and interviewed a servant of Yunus outside the Tigrayan city of Adwa in 1809.

In 1809, Yunus also briefly acted as an envoy between Pearce and the then Ras of Tigray, Wolde Selassie.

In 1809, Yunus was secretly poisoned by the Damoheita Afar after they received letters with orders from Omar Aga, the Ottoman governor of Massawa. In traditional Somali custom, Yunus's dhow was inherited by his son, Warsame, who, together with his uncle and his father's Damoheita Afar widow, buried and mourned the great merchant.

In 1841, Antoine d'Abbadie met a Majeerteen sailor named Muhammad Araale, who recounted that he had travelled with Salt in his youth alongside his uncle, Yunus Buraale. d'Abbadie wrote of Araale:

His name is Arrali, and he traveled with Salt, who received from his uncle the information this author gives on the Somali country. Salt writes his uncle's name Yunis (Younis).

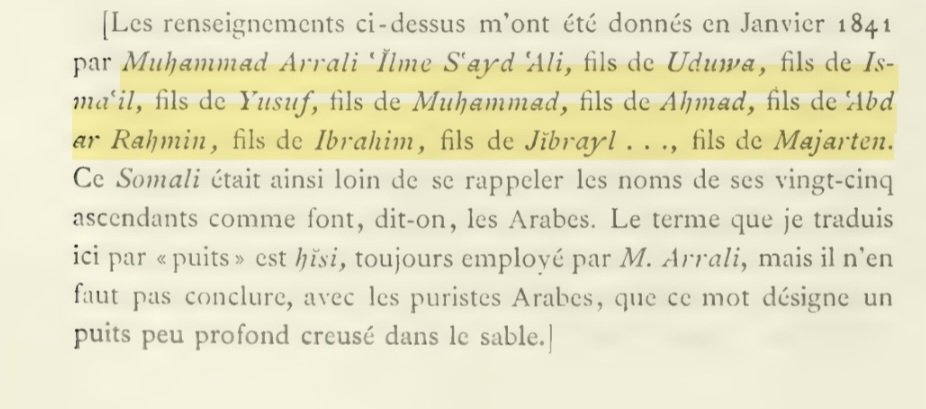
Majeerteen lineage of Muhammad Araale, the nephew of Yunus Buraale

In January 1841, d'Abbadie recorded the complete lineage of Yunus's nephew Araale, confirming Yunus's Majeerteen lineage as follows:

Muhamad Araale Ilmi Siyad Ali Odowaa Ismail Yusuf Muhamad Ahmed Abdirahim Ibrahim Jibraahiil....Majeerteen.

Yunus's ties to the Abdirahim Ibrahim branch of Majeerteen were further confirmed by Theodor von Heuglin upon his visit to Harena and Baka Island on the Bay of Howakil, where he listed the descendants of Yunus in Baka and Harena as "Somalis from Eial Abd Ur Rahim (Abdurahim Ibrahim)."

=== The Eritrean Majeerteen Sultanate of Baka Island ===
Majeerteen merchants from the Warwaaqsame subclan migrated to Harena from the Bari region, including Muhammad Abubakar (Warwaaqsame subclan), who arrived in Harena during the late 1700s with Yunus (Abdirahim Ibrahim subclan) and Yunus's brother. His son, Ahmed Muhammad, later rose to prominence as a merchant known throughout the Red Sea. His mercantile activities extended from Suakin, where he met Theodor von Heuglin in 1857, to Massawa and the Howakil region.

The Damoheita Afar of the Howakil, with whom Ahmed Muhammad traded, were so impressed by his wealth that they granted him control of the island of Baka and gave him three wives from the daughters of prominent Damoheita Afar chiefs with whom he had twenty sons. Major Teobaldo Folchi confirmed this in his report, writing:

Seventy or eighty years ago a Somali chief, a certain Mohammed Ahmed, arrived in Harena, coming from Mogadishu, to take up residence there. Welcomed by the Damhoeita as an honored guest, he became part of their community and was related by marriage to three of their leaders, who, having given their daughters in marriage to the new arrival, spontaneously offered him the island of Baca as a gift for him to inhabit.

In 1857, Heuglin also confirmed the ownership of Baka Island by the Massawa merchant Ahmed Muhammad.

In 1869, Ahmed Muhammad was, in effect, because of his great riches, the undisputed ruler of the entire Howakil coast as far as Meder, with even local Afar chiefs deferring to Ahmed when the French consul Werner Munzinger attempted to travel through Afar country, sending boats to him to ask for permission to allow Munzinger to travel.

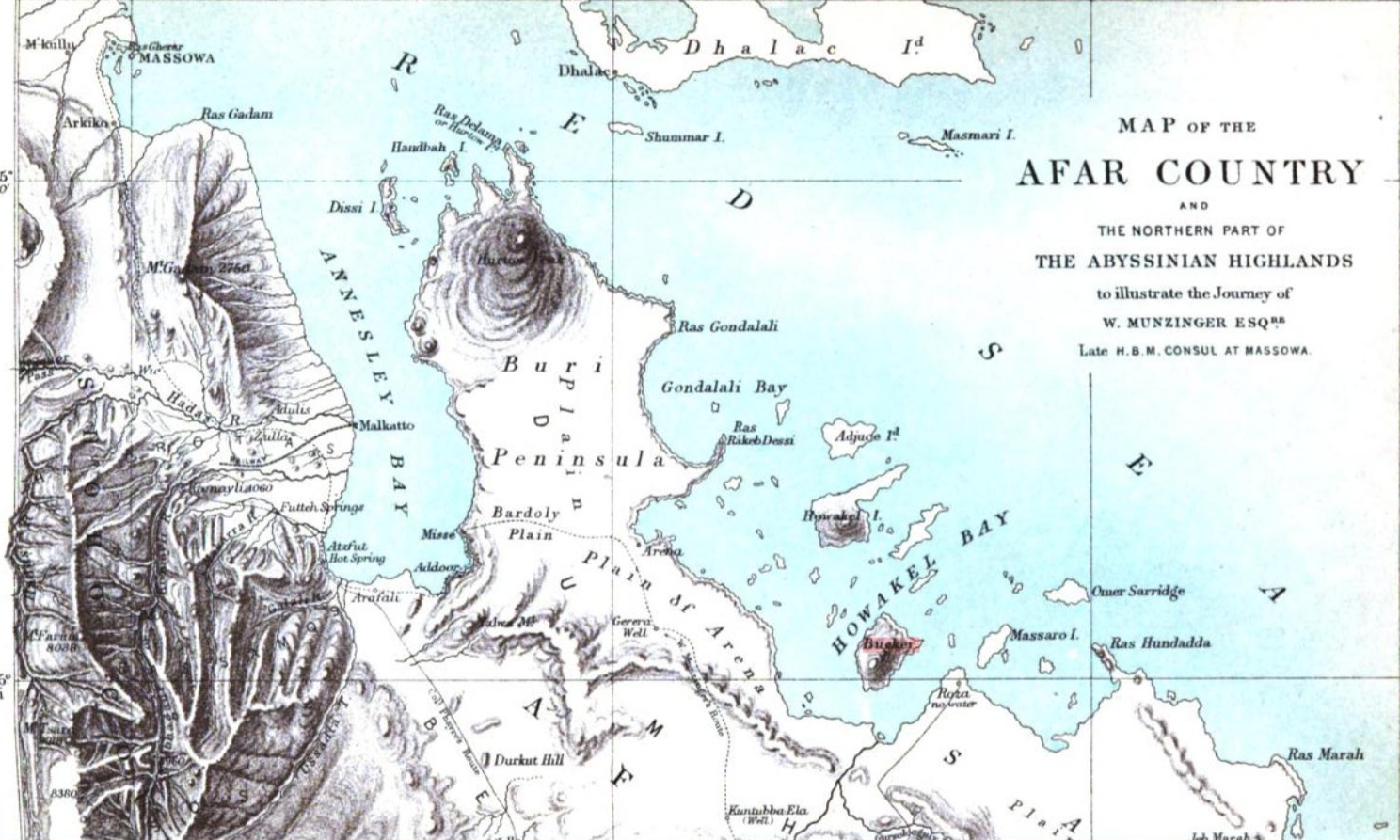
Map of Baka

By 1872, during Hildebrandt's visit to Baka, Ahmed Muhammad had died, and the island was inhabited by his twenty sons and their families.

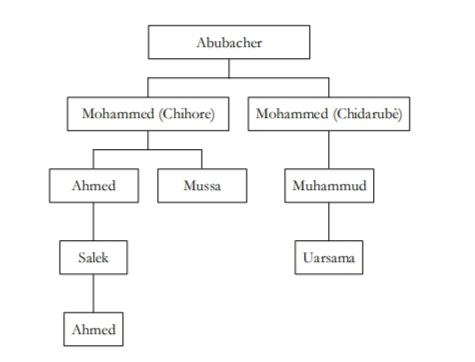
The lineage of the Baka Sultans Ahmed, Musa, and Warsame

After Ahmed's death, his brother, Musa Muhammad, was appointed the new Sultan of Baka. Later, his cousin's son, Warsame Muhammud, also settled on the island and became the new head of the island, which he, in turn, passed on to Saleh, the son of Ahmed Muhammad, during the time of Italian occupation. Saleh Ahmed passed away in 1897 and was succeeded by his son, Ahmed Saleh.

The tribes of Baka were subdivided into three fractions, each descended from the island's former rulers:

- Bayt Ahmed Muhammad - descendants of the first Sultan of Baka, Ahmed Muhammad
- Bayt Musa Muhammad - descendants of the second Sultan of Baka, Musa Muhammad
- Bayt Warsame Muhammud - descendants of the third Sultan of Baka, Warsame Muhammud

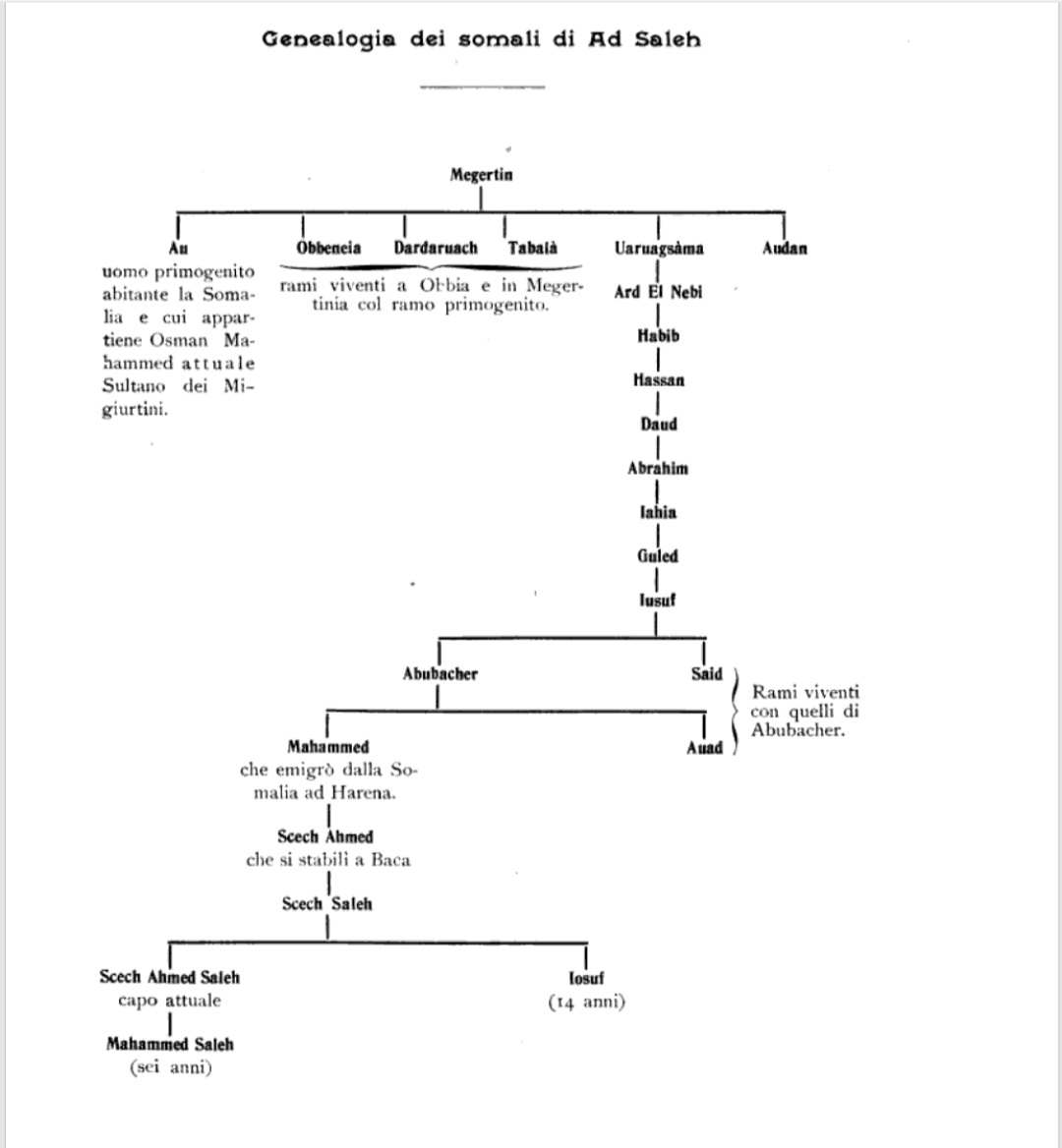
The Lineage of the Eritrean Sultan of the Warwaqsame Majeerteen, 1913

During the Italian occupation of Eritrea, the tribe came to be collectively known as "Ad Saleh", named after their most prominent Sultan, Saleh Ahmed. The Italian authorities also recorded the lineage of the then Sultan of Baka as:

Sheikh Ahmed Saleh Ahmed Muhammad Abubakar Yusuf Guled Yahya Ibrahim Daud Hassan Habib Ardul-Nabi Warwaaqsame Majeerteen.

In 1891, conflict broke out between rival factions within the Baka Majeerteen and the Damoheita Afar. Taher Ahmed Muhammad, angered by Sultan Ahmed Saleh's decision to make peace with the Damoheita, declared himself the rightful Sultan and rebelled against his nephew, Ahmed Saleh Ahmed Muhammad, demanding to be named the leader of Baka. Taher fled to the court of Sultan Osman Mahmud of Majeerteeniya. Sultan Osman then attempted to mediate and resolve the dispute between Taher and Ahmed, as reflected in the letters between him and Governor Gandolfi of Italian Eritrea.

Sheikh Ahmed Saleh's claim to the Sultanate of Baka was supported by Sheikh Mohamed Zebibi, chief of the Beit Khalifa subsection of the Asawurta Saho, and Naib Idris Hassan of the Balaw of Massawa. In a report concerning the dispute, Gandolfi wrote:

The aforementioned Sheikh Saleh inherited the Sheikhate of the island of Baka from his ancestors, as you will see from the documents sent to his family by both the Turkish and Egyptian governments, and as Naib Idris of Moncullo and Sheikh Zibibi of Zula could also attest.

In 1895, Sheikh Ahmed Saleh inherited the nearby island of Abbagubba and imposed tribute on the local Damoheita Afar. In 1997, Sheikh Jamal al-Din al-Shami published Al Manhal fi Tarikh wa Akhbar al-Afar al-Danakil, which included an interview with an elderly Sheikh Ahmed Saleh. In the interview, Ahmed Saleh again recited his lineage to Majeerteen and recounted how his ancestors settled on the Eritrean coast.

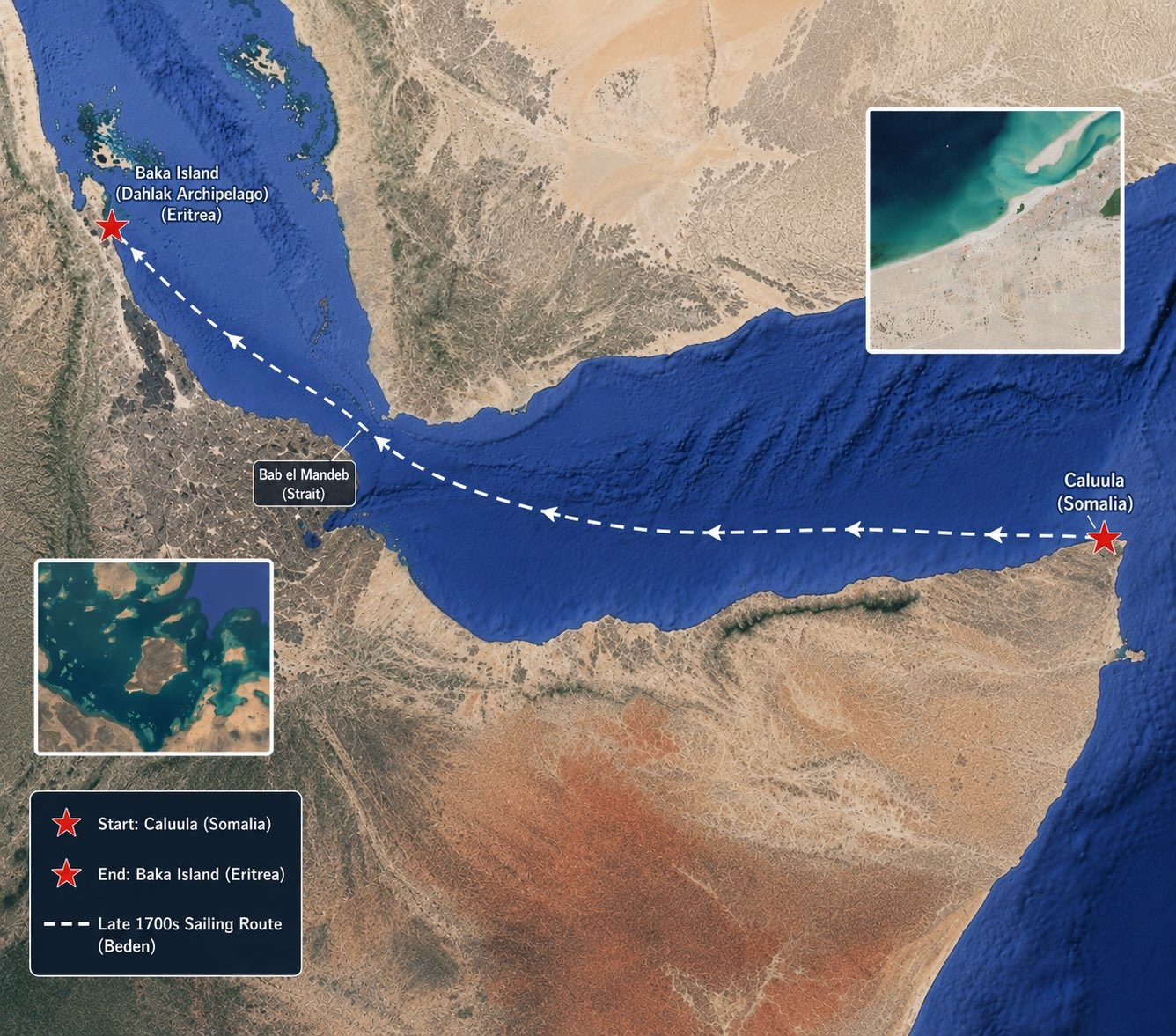
The journey from Somalia to Eritrea, taken by the Majeerteen merchants in the late 1700s

=== The Somali Majeerteen Sultanates ===
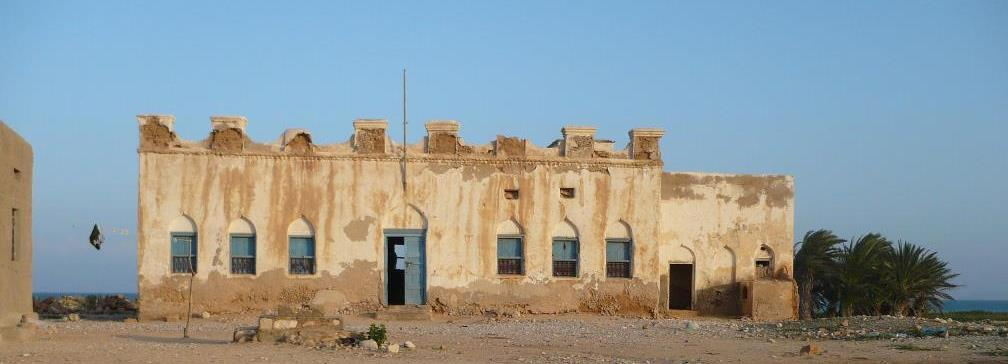
Ruins of a Majeerteen Sultanate castle in Bargal

The Majeerteen Sultanate was founded in the 15-16th century and came to prominence in the 19th century, under the reign of the resourceful King (Boqor) Osman Mahamuud. His Sultanate controlled Bari Karkaar, Nugaal and also central Somalia in the 19th and early 20th centuries. The polity maintained a robust trading network, entered into treaties with foreign powers, and exerted strong centralized authority on the domestic front.

Osman Mahamuud's Sultanate was nearly destroyed in the late-1800s by a power struggle between himself and his ambitious cousin, Yusuf Ali Kenadid who founded the Sultanate of Hobyo in 1878. Initially he wanted to seize control of the neighbouring Majeerteen Sultanate, ruled by his cousin Boqor Osman Mahamud. However, Yusuf Ali Kenadid was unsuccessful in his endeavour, and was eventually forced into exile in Yemen. A decade later, in the 1870s, Yusuf Ali Kenadid returned from the Arabian Peninsula with a band of Hadhrami musketeers and a group of devoted lieutenants. With their assistance, he managed to overpower the local Hawiye clans and establish the Kingdom of Hobyo in 1878.

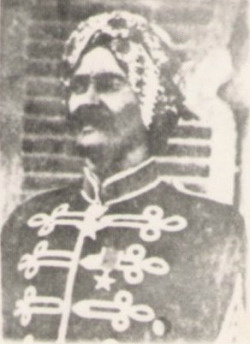
Majeerteen ruler Ali Yusuf Kenadid, 2nd Sultan of the Sultanate of Hobyo

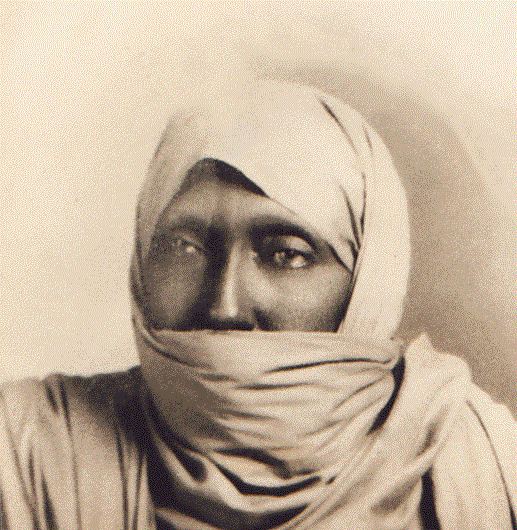
Osman Yusuf Kenadid, creator of the Osmanya script

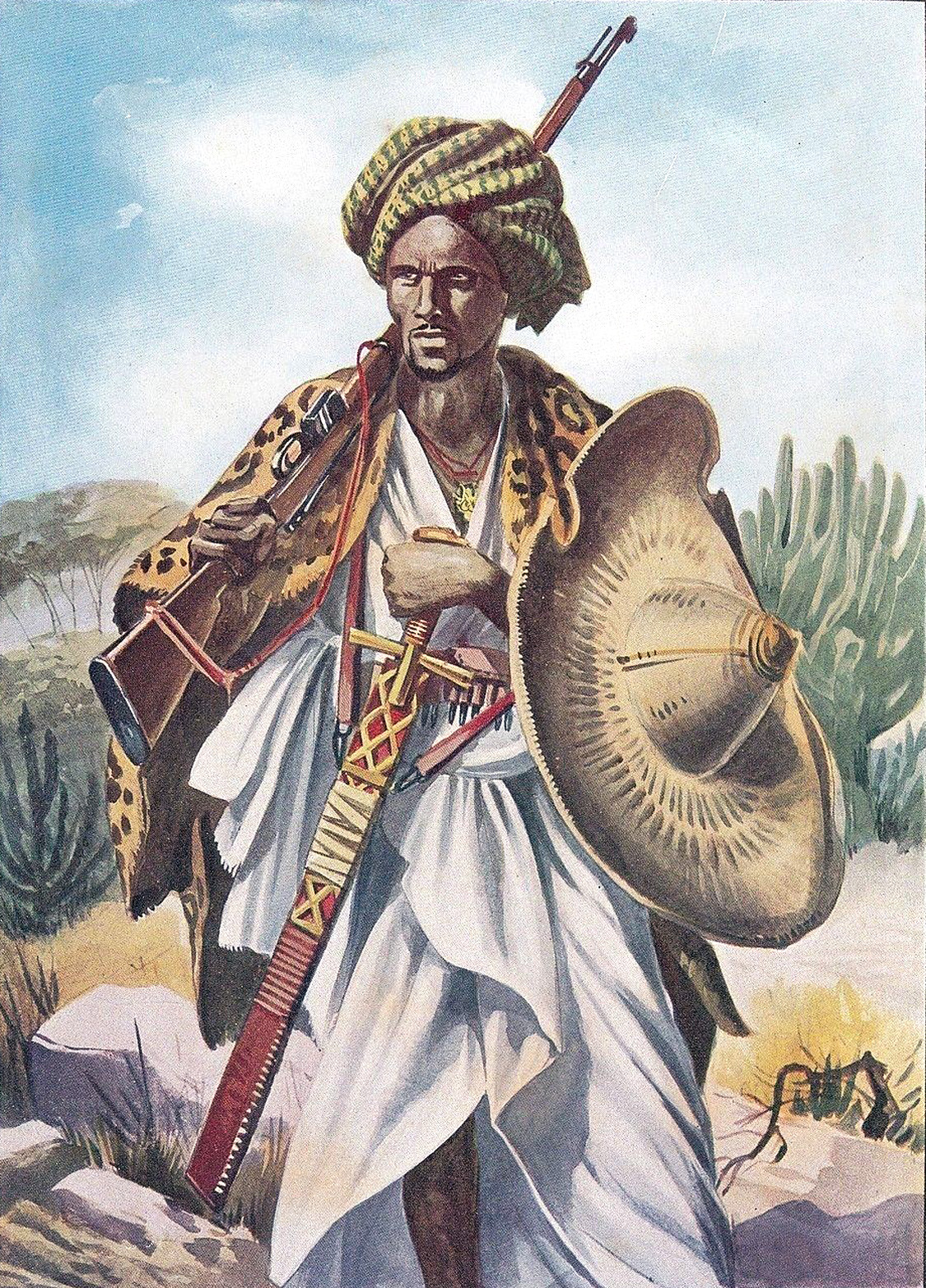
Hersi Boqor, son of Boqor Osman

As with the Majeerteen Sultanate, the Sultanate of Hobyo exerted a strong centralized authority during its existence, and possessed all of the organs and trappings of an integrated modern state: a functioning bureaucracy, a hereditary nobility, titled aristocrats, a state flag, as well as a professional army. Both sultanates also maintained written records of their activities, which still exist.

=== Colonial era ===
In the late 19th century, all extant northern Somali monarchs entered into treaties with one of the colonial powers, Abyssinia, Britain or Italy, except for the Dhulbahante. Likewise, in late 1889, Boqor Osman entered into a treaty with the Italians, making his realm an Italian protectorate. His rival Sultan Kenadid had signed a similar agreement vis-a-vis his own Sultanate the year before. Both rulers had signed the protectorate treaties to advance their own expansionist objectives, with Boqor Osman looking to use Italy's support in his ongoing power struggle with Kenadid over the Majeerteen Sultanate. Boqor Osman and Sultan Kenadid also hoped to exploit the conflicting interests among the European imperial powers that were then looking to control the Somali peninsula, so as to avoid direct occupation of their territories by force.

The relationship between the Sultanate of Hobyo and Italy soured when Sultan Kenadid refused the Italians' proposal to allow a British contingent of troops to disembark in his Sultanate so that they might then pursue their battle against Mohammed Abdullah Hassan's Dervish forces. Viewed as too much of a threat by the Italians, Sultan Kenadid was eventually exiled to Aden in Yemen and then to Eritrea, as was his son Ali Yusuf, the heir apparent to his throne.

Osman Yusuf Kenadid, the son of the first Sultan Yusuf Ali Kenadid, was a famous poet and scholar. Osman Yusuf Kenadid was the inventor of the first phonetically standard script for the Somali language in the 1920s, the Osmanya Script.

Following a two-year resistance by Boqor Osman and Majeerteen rebels, Italian Somaliland came under the full authority of Rome by late 1927. Long-lasting Italian coastal bombardments on urban settlements and naval blockades were utilized by colonial forces to suppress the rebels.

== Lineage ==
There is no clear agreement on the clan and sub-clan structures and many lineages are omitted. The following listing is taken from the World Bank's Conflict in Somalia: Drivers and Dynamics from 2005 and the United Kingdom's Home Office publication, Somalia Assessment 2001.

Darod
  - Isse Darod
  - Yusuf Darod (Awrtable)
  - Ahmed Darod (Sade)
  - Hussein Darod (Tanade)
  - Mohamed Darod (Kablalah)
  - Kuumade Mohamed
    - Abdi Mohamed (Koombe)
      - Harla Koombe
      - Geri Koombe
      - Jiran Kombe
      - Hayle Koombe
      - Salah (Harti) Koombe
        - Abdirahman Harti (Kaskiqabe)
        - Sead Harti (Dhulbahante)
        - Liban Harti (Liibaangashe)
        - Ali Harti (Geesi-gulle)
        - Ahmed Harti (Mororcase)
          - Ismail Ahmed
            - Mohamoud Ismail (Dishishe)
        - Mohamoud Harti
          - Hinjiye Mohamoud
          - Mohamed Mohamoud (Warsengali)
        - Mohamed Harti (Majeerteen)
          - Mohamoud Mohamed (Wabeeneeye)
          - Taballe Mohamed
          - Ahmed Mohamed (War-waaqsame)
          - Aawe Mohamed
            - Omar "sorore"
              - Nuux Omar (Reer Nuux)
              - Abdirahman Omar (Amaanle)
              - Ismail Omar
              - Nolays Omar
                - Muse Nolays (Idigfacel)
                - Abdikarim Nolays (Tiif Tiif)
                - Abdalle Nolays (Daanweyne)
                - Yusuf Nolays
                - Mohamed "Walal Yabare" Nolays
                  - Hijijle Mohamed "Walal Yabare"
                    - Ahmed Hijile (Gumasoor)
                    - Mohamed Hijijle (Reer waarag)
                    - Shiehk Sead Hijile (Amarti Waaq)
                    - Yusuf Hijijle (Nuurki Qabe)
                    - Ali Hijiijle
                    - Talorer Hijijle
                      - Mohamed Talorer (Wadalmuge)
                      - Hussein Talorer (Siwaaqroon)
                      - Hassan "Nebidor" Talorer
                        - Mohamed Hassan (Gudoonwaaq)
                        - Abdullahi "Toljecle" Hassan
                          - Mohamed "Umadnebi" Abdullahi
                            - Ali Mohamed "Umadnebi" (Cali Umadnebi)
                            - Ishaq Mohamed "Umadnebi" (Isxaaq Umadnebi)
                            - Omar Mohamed "Umadnebi" (Reer Cumar)
                            - Jibrahil Mohamed "Umadnebi"
                              - Ali Jibrahil
                              - Salah Jibrahil
                              - Isamil Jibrahil
                              - Nuh Jibrahil
                              - Omar Jibrahil
                              - Isse Jibrahil
                              - Adam Jibrahil
                              - Yusuf Jibrahil
                              - Ibrahim Jibrahil
                                - Ismail Ibrahim
                                - Adam Ibrahim
                                - Abdullahi Ibrahim
                                - Ahmed Ibrahim
                                  - Abdirahim Ahmed (Abdiraxiim Ibraahim)
                                - Ali Ibrahim (Bicidyahan)
                                - Hassan "Kaba alif" Ibrahim
                                - Mohamud Ibrahim (Reer Maxamuud)
                                - Mohamed Ibrahim
                                  - Yahye Mohamed
                                  - Adam Mohamed
                                  - Ismail Mohamed
                                  - Sead Mohamed
                                  - Ishaq Mohamed
                                  - Saleban Mohamed
                                    - Jibrahil Saleban
                                    - Abdikarim Saleban
                                    - Abdirahim Saleban
                                    - Muse "Ugaar" Saleban (Ugaar Saleebaan)
                                    - Ismail Saleban
                                    - Ali Saleban
                                    - Mohamoud Saleban
                                      - Osman Mahmoud (Bah-Dir)
                                      - Omar Mahmoud (Bah-Dir)
                                      - Isse Mohamoud (Bah-Dir)
                                      - Nuh Mohamoud (Bah-leelkase)
                                      - Xariir Mohamoud (Bah-leelkase)
                                      - Muse Mohamoud (Bah-leelkase)
                                      - Yahye Mohamoud (Bah-leelkase)

== Groups ==
- Taargooye, an exclusively Majeerteen Darawiish administrative division and disbanded in 1910 when its constituents became mutinous
- The Somali Salvation Democratic Front (SSDF) was a predominantly Majeerteen political group from the 1980s to 1990s

== Notable people ==
=== Royalty ===
- Ali Yusuf Kenadid, last sultan of the Sultanate of Hobyo
- Osman Mahamuud, king of the Majeerteen Sultanate
- Yusuf Ali Kenadid, founder of the Sultanate of Hobyo

=== Military ===
- Abdullahi Ahmed Irro, Somali general, founded the National Academy for Strategy
- Abshir Abdi Jama, former commander in chief of Puntland Dervish Force from 2022 to 2023
- Asad Osman Abdullahi, Chief of the Somali Police Force
- Jama Ali Jama, colonel in the Somali military and former president of Puntland
- Khalif Isse Mudan, former Minister of Security of Puntland and Commander of the SAF Training Wing
- Mohamed Abshir Muse, first commander of the Somali Police Force
- Mohamed Osman Irro, Colonel in the Somali National Army
- Mohammed Said Hersi Morgan, former Ministry of Defence (9 September 1990 – 26 January 1991)

=== Enterprisers ===
- Ali A. Abdi, sociologist, professor of education and international development at the University of British Columbia.
- Ali Haji Warsame, entrepreneur, former Chief Executive Officer of Golis Telecom Somalia
- Iman, Somali American elite fashion model, actress, entrepreneur and philanthropist, widow of English rock musician David Bowie
- Maxamed Daahir Afrah, novelist, playwright, journalist and scholar
- Mohammed Awale Liban, designed the flag of Somalia
- Omar A. Ali, entrepreneur, accountant, financial consultant, philanthropist, and leading specialist on Islamic finance
- Shire Haji Farah, entrepreneur, and Executive Committee Member of the Somali Business Council
- Yaasiin Cismaan Kenadid, traditional Somali linguist
- Yasin Haji Osman Sharmarke, leader and co-founder of the Somali Youth League
- Osman Yusuf Kenadid, inventor of the Osmanya writing script

=== Politicians ===
- Abdirashid Shermarke, first prime minister of Somalia, second president of Somalia (1967–1969)
- Abdirizak Haji Hussein, former prime minister of Somalia (1964–1967), and former secretary general of the Somali Youth League
- Abdullahi Yusuf Ahmed, former president of Somalia, president of Puntland and co-founder of the Somali Salvation Democratic Front
- Abdirahman Farole, former President of Puntland and senator of Federal Government of Somalia
- Abdi Farah Said, former Somali minister of interior, current minister of interior of Puntland
- Abshir Omar Huruse, current Somali minister of foreign affairs
- Abdisaid Muse Ali, former Somali minister of foreign affairs
- Abdulqawi Yusuf, lawyer and judge at the International Court of Justice
- Abdirahman Mohamed Farole, former president of Puntland
- Abdiweli Mohamed Ali, former prime minister of Somalia, and former president of Puntland
- Ahmed Isse Awad, former Somali Minister of Foreign Affairs
- Ali Abdi Aware, former Puntland state minister
- Asha Gelle Dirie, former minister of Puntland; founder and executive director of TAG Foundation
- Ayaan Hirsi Ali, Dutch politician, first Somali-born member of parliament of a European country, author and political activist
- Farah Ali Jama, former minister of finance of Puntland
- Haji Bashir Ismail Yusuf, first president of the Somali National Assembly, former minister of health and labor of Somalia
- Hassan Abshir Farah, former Mogadishu mayor, Somali ambassador to Japan and later Germany, interior minister of Puntland
- Hassan Ali Mire, first minister of education of the Somali Democratic Republic, former chairman of the Somali Salvation Democratic Front
- Hirsi Magan Isse, scholar and revolutionary leader with the Somali Salvation Democratic Front
- Ilhan Omar, Somali American politician, member of the United States House of Representatives for Minnesota's 5th congressional district since 2019
- Mire Hagi Farah Mohamed, former Somali minister of finance, and former mayor of Kismayo
- Mohamed Abdi Aware, Puntland judge and member of the Supreme Judicial Council of Puntland
- Mohammed Said Hersi Morgan, son-in-law of Siad Barre and minister of defense of Somalia
- Mohamed Abdirizak Mohamud, former Somali minister of foreign affairs
- Mohamud Muse Hersi, third president of Puntland
- Said Abdullahi Dani, former minister of planning of Somalia, current president of Puntland
- Saida Haji Bashir Ismail, former Somali finance vice-minister in the Transitional National Government (2000–2004)
- Omar Samatar, fought against Italian occupation of Hobyo after the surrender of the Sultan of Hobyo
- Omar Sharmarke, former prime minister of Somalia and son of Abdirashid Ali Sharmarke
- Yusuf Mohamed Ismail, former ambassador of Somalia to the United Nations Human Rights Office in Geneva
- Yusuf Osman Samatar, politician

== Bibliography ==
- Carpanelli, Elena; Scovazzi, Tullio (2020). Political and legal aspects of Italian colonialism in Somalia. G. Giappichelli editore. ISBN 978-88-921-8346-9. OCLC 1150848404.
