= Yusuf Osman Samatar =

Yusuf Osman Samatar (Barda'ad)
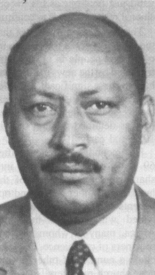
- Born: 15 March 1932; Somalia
- Died: 13 February 2024 (aged 87)
- Occupations: lawyer, politician qareen iyo siyaasi
- Children: 6

Yusuf Osman Samatar (Barda'ad) (Somali: Yuusuf Cismaan Samatar (Bardacad)15 March 1932 – 13 February 2020) was a Somali lawyer, post-colonial political party leader, and member of Somalia's parliament. First arrested in 1969, Samatar was arrested again in 1975 by the dictatorial regime and detained without charge or trial. A prisoner of conscience, Samatar would spend nearly two decades in prison, mostly in solitary confinement making him the longest serving political prisoner in Somalia's history.

== Personal life ==
Born in the Nugal region of Somalia in 1932, Yusuf Osman Samatar hails from the Majeerteen clan. He completed his primary and secondary school studies in Somalia before leaving for Italy to study political science at the University of Rome. In the 1950s, Samatar returned to Somalia where he attended law school, obtaining a law degree before entering the political scene.

Yusuf Osman Samatar was married twice, first to Zeinab with whom he had three children and later in the 1970s to the daughter of prominent politician Muse Boqor. In the latter years of life, Samatar resided with his wife Maryan Muse Boqor in Boston.

== Political career ==
After returning to his native Somalia, Samatar became very active in the nationalist movement, first joining the Somali Youth League and after independence establishing the first socialist party in the country. He was Secretary-General of the leftist Somali Democratic Union (SDU). The political party, which was formed in 1962, won 15 seats in the 1964 legislative elections making it one of the largest political parties in the country, only behind the Somali Youth League and Socialist National Congress (SNC) in votes. The SDU was banned by Mohamed Siad Barre following his rise to power in 1969.

A preeminent communist leader, Samatar served as a member of parliament until the military coup. after which he was imprisoned and detained without charge or trial almost continuously by the regime. His detention under Somalia's Detention Law, which contained no provisions for independent reviews of detentions nor allowed detainees the right to appeal their detention, was in direct violation of the United Nations Universal Declaration of Human Rights. In May 1975, Samatar was placed in permanent solitary confinement in Labatan Jirow maximum security prison due to his non-violent criticism of the government and his refusal to join or support the ruling Somali Revolutionary Socialist Party, which was the only legal political party in the country at the time.

According to Amnesty International, Samatar suffered from chronic ill-health and was denied medical treatment, family visits, access to any legal representative or correspondence of any kind. The organization routinely appealed to its supporters to write letters on behalf of Samatar to secure his release or at least improve his detention conditions. In February 1989, less than two years before the collapse of the Somali state, Samatar was released from prison. At the time, Amnesty International noted that Samatar was "one of the longest held prisoners of conscience" known to the organization.

== Later years ==
In 1994, Yusuf Osman Samatar moved to the United States with his family, settling in Boston. He re-entered Somali politics in the early 2000s, serving as a political adviser to Abdullahi Yusuf Ahmed who would later become President of Somalia. At the time, President Ahmed's government represented the most serious effort to unite Somalia following 17 years of anarchy after the collapse of Somali state. Samatar died on 13 February 2024, at the age of 87.

== See also ==
- Persecution of the Majeerteen
- Somali Youth League
