= Bay of Hawakil =

Bay on the Red Sea, on the coast of Eritrea

- Howakil Bay (Tigrinya)
- Location in Eritrea
- Coordinates: 15°0′N 40°13′E
- Ocean/sea sources: Red Sea
- Basin countries: Eritrea
- Max. length: 26 km (16 mi)
- Max. width: 57 km (35 mi)
- Islands: Hawakil Islands
- Settlements: Fiok, Akilo and Boholo

Bay of Hawakil or Howakil Bay is a bay on the Red Sea, on the coast of Eritrea. The bay is full of islands.

== Geography ==
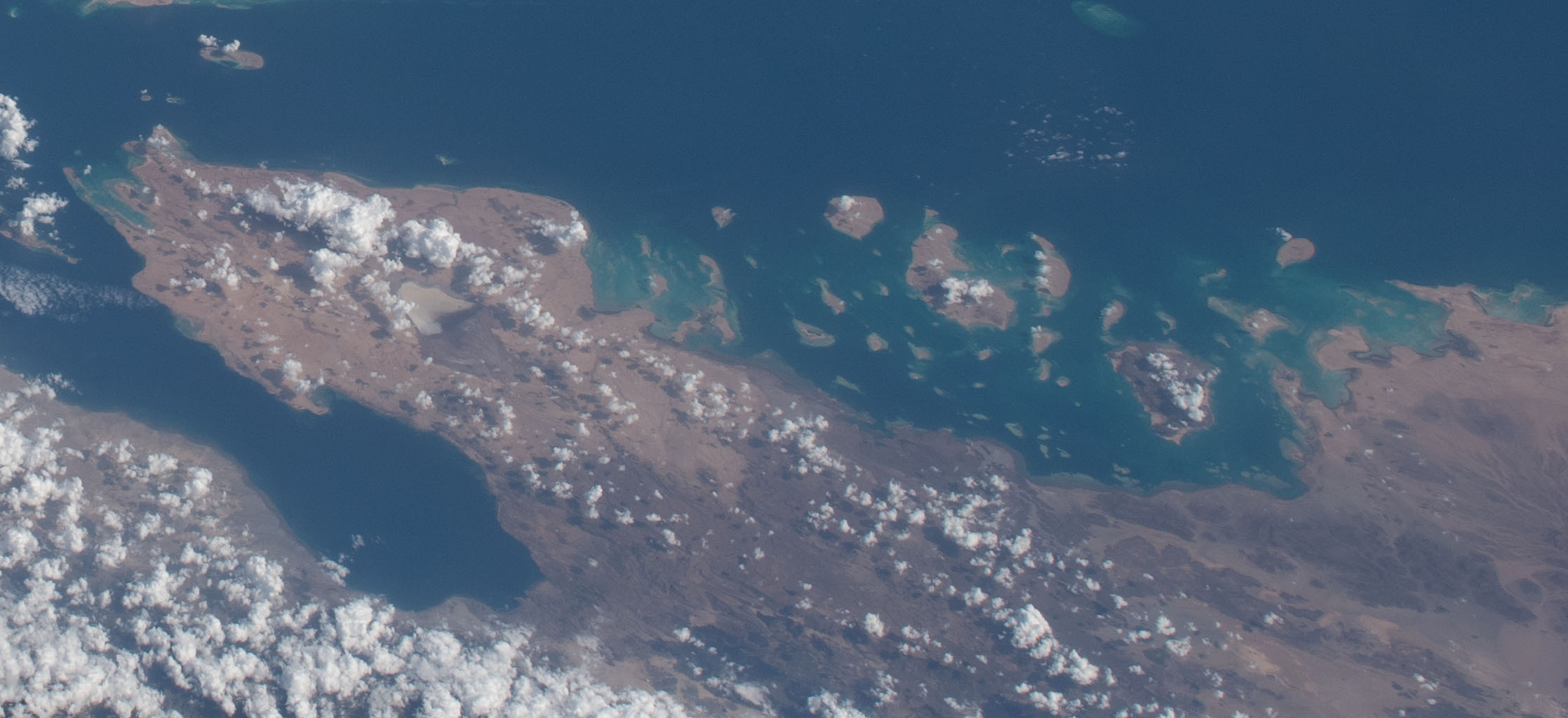
Gulf of Zula, Buri Peninsula, Bay of Howakil, islands, clouds (ISS-photo)

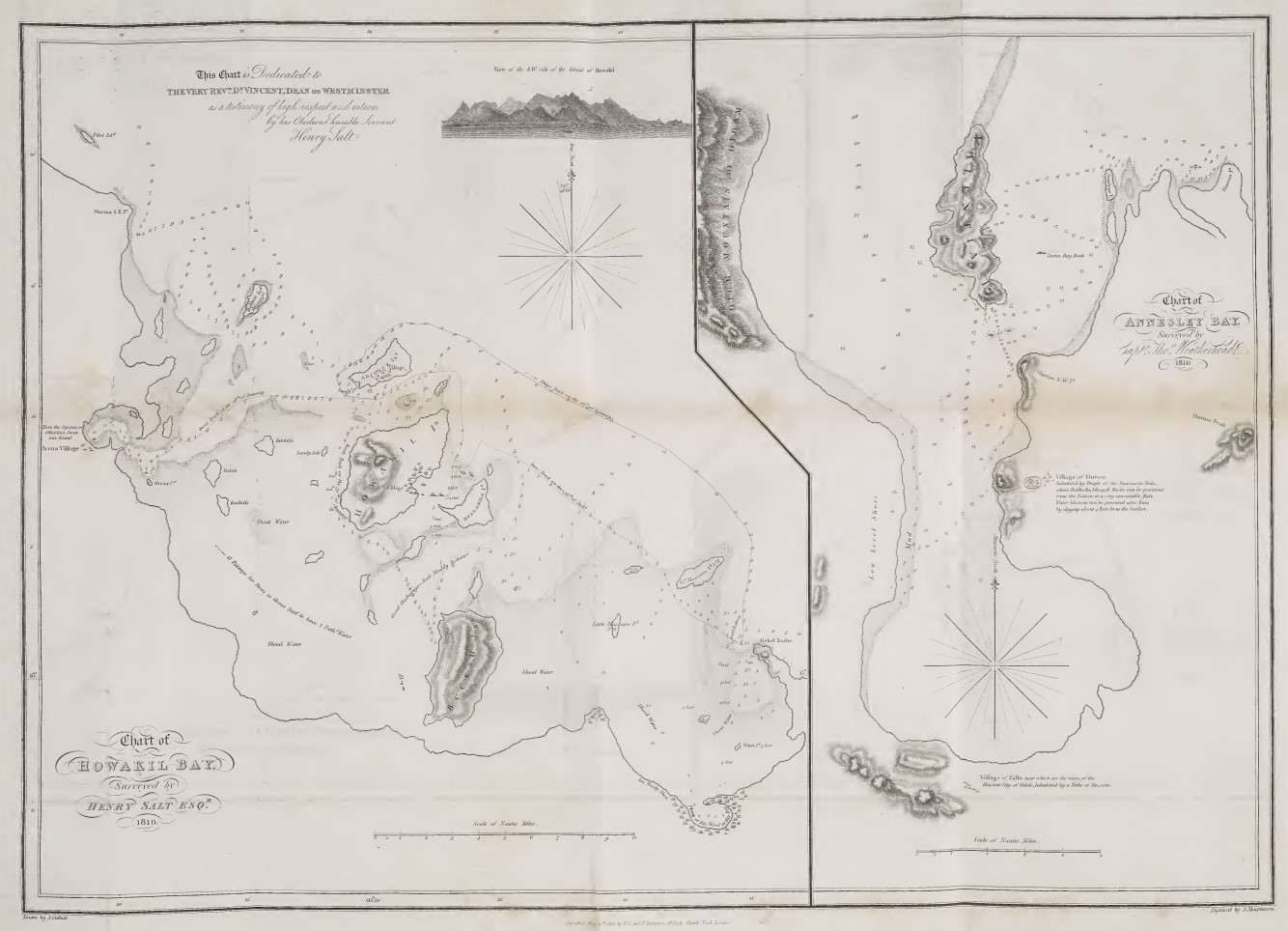
Chart of Howakil Bay, surveyed by Henry Salt in 1810

The Bay of Hawakil is located about 120 km east of Asmara. It is open towards the northeast and the Hawakil Islands fill the bay. The easternmost headland is Ras Herbe and the northernmost Ras Lamma Tacaito. The settlements of Fiok, Akilo and Boholo lie on the western shore of the bay.
