= Garad Adan Bin Kooshin =

Dervish statesman born 1813

- خراد ادن بن كوشن
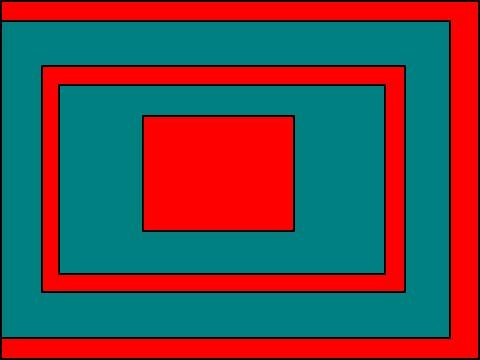
- Dervish Statesman
- Successor: Garad Gibreel Bin Adan
- Born: 1813; Harar
- Died: Unknown; Tuliguled
- Polygyny: Dahabo
- Issue: Garad Gibreel Ibn Adan [[Ugas Sherwa Bin Adan Bin Kooshin isaxaaq xasan abraahiin reer geedi aadan ]]
- Dynasty: Ishaaq Hassan Awbarre
- Father: Kooshin
- Religion: Islam
- Occupation: Dervish Statesman

Garad Adan Bin Kooshin, referred to as Prince Adan (Arabic: خراد ادن بن كوشن ) was the supreme Garad of the Somali Geri Koombe, a wider branch of Darood Garad Adan was well documented by Sir Richard Burton in his expedition to East Africa in which Garad Adan was the first man in history to escort a European to the Holy City of Harar. Garad Adan belonged to a hereditary line of Garad succession predating the Adalite period. Garad Adan was described by Burton as a powerful and feared leader. Adan shared kin with the emirs of Harar and conducted trade with the emirs even controlling the trade route from Harar to Berbera. Garad Adan is famous for being the last man to remain behind Harar after the battle of Chelenqo despite the Amir of Harar fleeing, Garad Adan also led a successful rebellion against the Egyptian Khedavites, by plundering the Khedivates numerous times, his son named Garad Gibreel bin Adan later succeeded him In Garadship, Garad Gibreel continued the resistance against the Egyptian Khedavites, Garad Gibreel Ibn Adan gave a devastating slaughter to the Egyptian Khedivates, By massacring 900 Khedivates in a single battle.This then subsequently led to Garad Gibreel being captured and exiled to Cairo, Egypt.

== Life ==
Garad Adan was the supreme Garaad of Geri Koombe, well documented by British explorer Richard Burton who went to East Africa and then traveled to Harar. He was the first European to arrive at Harar. In his time there he wrote extensively about Garaad Adan.

He was the brother-in-law of the Gadabursi tribe. Garad Adan had many son's, his son named Sherwa first welcomed Richard Burton, Sherwa arrived to Richard Burton on a pony. Garad Adan was also a political figure.He was a part of the Dervish movement led by Poet Sayid Mohammed Abdullah Hassan

Burton noted that Garad Adan exercised direct authoritative power:

The Gerad Adan was powerful, being the head of a tribe of cultivators, not split up, like the Bedouins, into independent clans, and he thus exercises a direct influence upon the conterminous races

Upon arriving to Harar Burton worried about Garad Adan since the route to Harar was frequently attacked by Somali warriors. Eventually Burton was attacked and scarred on his left cheek. Burton wrote:

The greatest danger we had run was from the Garad Adan, a fact of which I was not aware till some time after my return to Berbera: he had always been plotting an avanie which, if attempted, would have cost him dear, but at the same time would certainly have proved fatal to us.

Burton noted that the Karanle clan were under the protection of Garad Adan. Burton also highlighted how the Karanle had no Garad of their own and that Garad Adan ruled them.

The Karanle has been noticed in a previous chapter. Of the Usbayhan I saw but few individuals: they informed me that their tribe numbered forty villages and about 1000 shields; that they had no chief of their own race, but owned the rule of the Girhi Their principal clans are the Rer Yusuf, Rer Said, Rer Abokr, and Yusuf Liyo

== Descriptions ==
Adan was hostile to foreigners. Burton asked permission to meet Garad Adan, who then invited Burton to one of his villages. Burton wrote about the Geri Koombe clan:

He wrote:

The Girhi or "Giraffes" inhabiting these hills are like most of the other settled Somal, a derivation from Darud and descended from Kombo. Despite the unmerciful persecutions of the Gallas, they gradually migrated westwards from Makhar, their original nest, now number 5000 shields, possess about 180 villages, and are accounted the power paramount. Though friendly with the Habr Awal, the Girhi seldom descend, unless compelled by want of pasture, into the plains

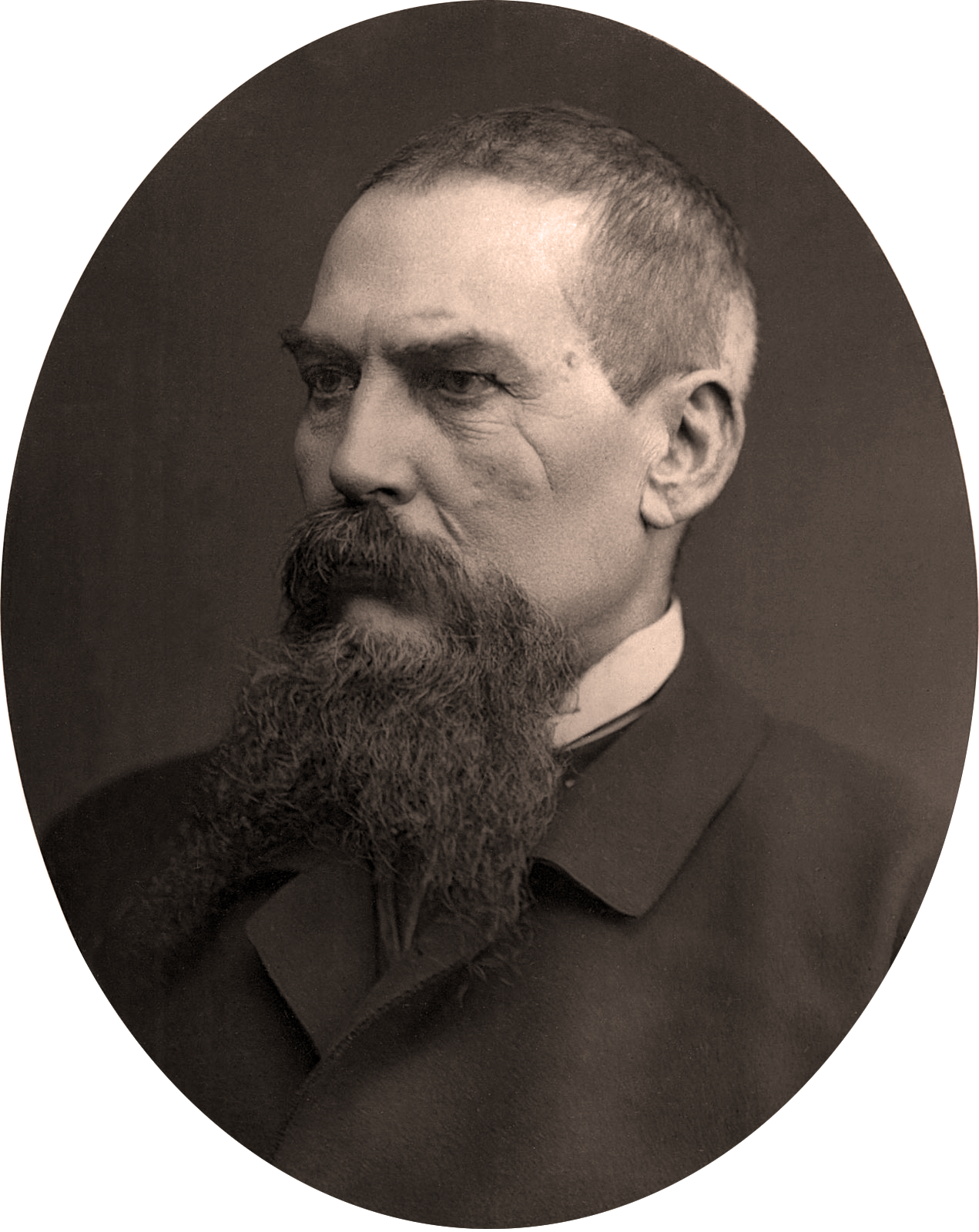
Richard Burton

Burton also reported that Garad Adan had been at war with the Gadabursi tribe. He subsequently plundered them, but both clans eventually agreed to peace Burton:

Some years ago Adan plundered one of Sharmarkay's caravans; repenting the action. he offered in marriage a daughter of his but she died just before

== See also ==
- Mohammed Abdullah Hassan - Leader of the Somali Dervish movement.
- Haji Sudi- One of the founding members of the Dervish movement and the chief military commander.
- Sultan Nur- Sultan of the Habr Yunis clan and one of the founding members of the Dervish movement and the Dervish Sultan.
- Hasna Doreh – wife of Mohammed Abdullah Hassan.
- Ismail Mire - A soldier and a bard .
- Bashir Yussuf – Somali religious leader who fought against the British alongside Mohammed Abdullah Hassan.
