= Ugaar Saleebaan =

Somali clan

Ugaar Saleebaan (Somali: ugaar saleebaan "muuse saleebaan", Arabic: موسى سليمان), is a Somali sub-clan. It forms a part of the Majeerteen subdivision of the Saleebaan Maxamed which fathered Cali, Maxamuud, Muuse, Ismaaciil and Cabdiraxiim - Majeerteen Harti confederation of Darod clans. Mainly founded in northeastern part of Somalia - Puntland state and southern Somalia - Jubaland state.
