= Ghela'elo =

Coordinates: 15°06′N 40°03′E

Galaalu قلعلو ገልዓሎ
- Interactive map of Galaalu
- Country: Eritrea
- Region: Northern Red Sea
- District: Ghela'elo
- Time zone: UTC+3 (EAT)

Galaalu is a town in coastal Eritrea. It is located in the Northern Red Sea region, and is the capital of the Ghela'elo district.
