= Gulf of Zula =

Body of water on the Eritrean coastline on the Red Sea

- Annesley Bay
- Zula Bahir Selat’ē (Tigrinya)
- Location in Eritrea
- Coordinates: 15°16′N 39°45′E
- Ocean/sea sources: Red Sea
- Basin countries: Eritrea
- Max. length: 55 km (34 mi)
- Max. width: 13 km (8.1 mi)
- Islands: Dese
- Settlements: Near Massawa

The Gulf of Zula, also known as Annesley Bay, Baia di Arafali or Zula Bahir Selat’ē, is a body of water on the Eritrean coastline on the Red Sea.

== Geography ==
The Gulf lies 15 km (9 mi) to the east of Massawa, near the midpoint of the Eritrean coast. It is located between the Foro subregion and the Buri Peninsula of the Ghela'elo subregion, both in the country's Northern Red Sea region. On the west side of the gulf are two large mountains, Jebel Gedem 925 m (3,035 ft) and Mount Arbalu 2,404 m (7,887 ft). Between the two, the Aligede River flows, with the village of Zula on its right bank. The coast of the gulf is fringed with mangroves on either side of the mouth of the river. The egyptologist Henry Salt identified Zula as the ancient archaeological site of Adulis.

Near the head of the gulf is the village of Arafali, beside the extinct Dola Volcano 161 m (528 ft). From here, several roads radiate into the surrounding areas. To the east of the gulf lies the Buri Peninsula. This generally low-lying, undulating area is composed of lava flows at the southern end and granite at the north. Fringing reefs border much of this coast. About 20 km (12 mi) beyond Arafali is Dolphin Cove, with a low, flat beach, backed by a steep rise to Mount Abdur 245 m (804 ft) behind. 14 km (9 mi) further on is the narrow Melita Bay with the village of Macanille at its head. Here there are coastal reefs and mangrove swamps.

The Gulf of Zula is a deep water bay, formed as part of the complex rifting system that occurred in these parts where three tectonic plates meet. The rift continues inland to the Danakil Depression, a sandy plain lying 120 m (390 ft) below sea level. The gulf also marks the territorial division between the Saho people and the Afar people.

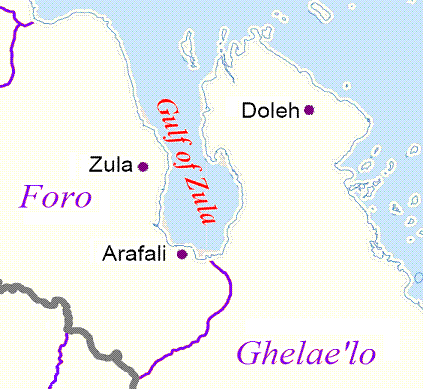
The Gulf of Zula and Buri Peninsula

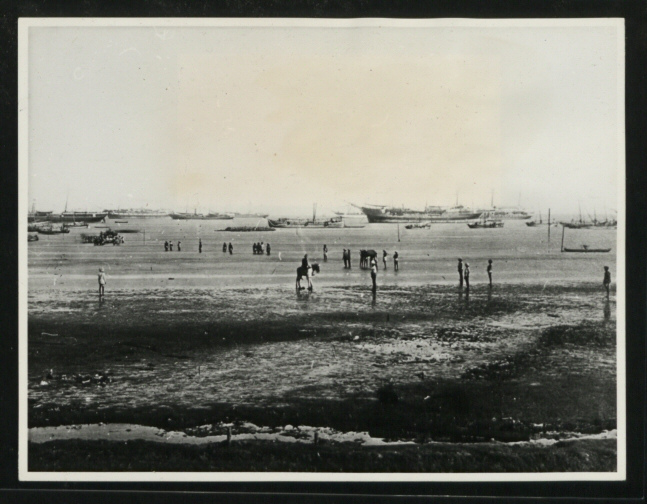
Photograph taken by 10th Field Company Royal Engineers during the British Expedition to Abyssinia
