= Al-Mufaddal ibn Abi al-Fada'il =

Egyptian historian (14th century)

al-Mufaddal ibn Abi al-Fada'il
- المفضل بن ابي الفضائل
- Born: al-Mufaddal ibn Abi al-Fada'il; Egypt
- Died: 1358
- Occupation: Historian

Academic work
- Era: Bahriyya Mamluks
- Notable works: al-Nahdj al-sadîd wa-l-durr al-farîd fimâ ba'd Ta'rîkh Ibn al'Amîd

Al-Mufaddal ibn Abi al-Fada'il (Arabic: المفضل بن ابي الفضائل) was a 14th-century Egyptian historian. He was a Coptic Christian.

Al-Mufaddal wrote a book about the history of the Bahriyya Mamluks, entitled al-Nahdj al-sadîd wa-l-durr al-farîd fimâ ba'd Ta'rîkh Ibn al'Amîd, covering the period from 1260 to 1340. He finished his work in 1358. Al-Muffaddal gives precise descriptions of the history of Egypt and Syria, especially the Mongol occupation of Syria. He noted down the Damascus declaration made by the Mongols, as well as the content of the letters exchanged between Ghazan and al-Nâsir. He also wrote extensively about the Horn of Africa.

== Works ==
- Moufazzal ibn Abi l-Fazil, Histoire des sultans mamlouks, edited and translated by Blochet.
