= Ghela'elo subregion =

Coordinates: 15.0143°N 40.0582°E

Ghela'elo
- Subregion
- Interactive map of Ghela'elo
- Country: Eritrea
- Region: Northern Red Sea
- Capital: Ghela'elo
- Time zone: UTC+3 (GMT +3)

Ghela'elo subregion (Ghelalo subregion) is a subregion in the Northern Red Sea region (Zoba Semienawi Keyih Bahri) of Eritrea. Its capital lies at Ghela'elo (Ghelalo).
